= Bibliography of Thomas Carlyle =

List of books by and about Thomas Carlyle

Thomas Carlyle in 1874

Thomas Carlyle published numerous works, and many more have been written about him by other authors.

== By Carlyle ==
=== Major works ===
The standard edition of Carlyle's works is the Works in Thirty Volumes, also known as the Centenary Edition. The date given is when the work was "originally published."

- Traill, Henry Duff, ed. (1896–1899). The Works of Thomas Carlyle in Thirty Volumes. London: Chapman and Hall.
  - Vol. I. Sartor Resartus: The Life and Opinions of Herr Teufelsdröckh in Three Books (1831)
  - Vols. I–III. The French Revolution: A History (1837)
  - Vol. IV. On Heroes, Hero-Worship, and the Heroic in History (1841)
  - Vols. V–IX. Oliver Cromwell's Letters and Speeches: with Elucidations (1845)
  - Vol. X. Past and Present (1843)
  - Vol. XI. The Life of John Sterling (1851)
  - Vols. XII–XIX. History of Friedrich II. of Prussia, Called Frederick the Great (1858–1865)
  - Vol. XX. Latter-Day Pamphlets (1850)
  - Vols. XXI–XXII. German Romance: Translations from the German, with Biographical and Critical Notices (1827)
  - Vols. XXIII–XXIV. Wilhelm Meister's Apprenticeship and Travels, Translated from the German of Goethe (1824)
  - Vol. XXV. The Life of Friedrich Schiller, Comprehending an Examination of His Works (1825)
  - Vols. XXVI–XXX. Critical and Miscellaneous Essays

=== Marginalia ===
This is a list of selected books, pamphlets and broadsides uncollected in the Miscellanies through 1880 as well as posthumous first editions and unpublished manuscripts.

- Ireland and Sir Robert Peel (1849)
- Legislation for Ireland (1849)
- Ireland and the British Chief Governor (1849)
- Froude, James Anthony, ed. (1881). Reminiscences. London: Longmans, Green, and Co.
- Reminiscences of My Irish Journey in 1849 (1882). London: Sampson Low, Marston, Searle & Rivington.
- Last Words of Thomas Carlyle: On Trades-Unions, Promoterism and the Signs of the Times (1882). 67 Princes Street, Edinburgh: William Paterson.
- Norton, Charles Eliot, ed. (1883). The Correspondence of Thomas Carlyle and Ralph Waldo Emerson. Boston: James R. Osgood and Company.
- Norton, Charles Eliot, ed. (1886). Early Letters of Thomas Carlyle. London and New York: Macmillan and Co.
- Thomas Carlyle's Counsels to a Literary Aspirant: A Hitherto Unpublished Letter of 1842 and What Came of Them (1886). Edinburgh: James Thin, South Bridge.
- Norton, Charles Eliot, ed. (1887). Reminiscences. London and New York: Macmillan and Co.
- Norton, Charles Eliot, ed. (1887). Correspondence Between Goethe and Carlyle. London and New York: Macmillan and Co.
- Norton, Charles Eliot, ed. (1888). Letters of Thomas Carlyle. London and New York: Macmillan and Co.
- Thomas Carlyle on the Repeal of the Union (1889). London: Field & Tuer, the Leadenhall Press.
- Newberry, Percy, ed. (1892). Rescued Essays of Thomas Carlyle. The Leadenhall Press.
- Last Words of Thomas Carlyle (1892). London: Longmans, Green, and Co.
- Karkaria, R. P., ed. (1892). Lectures on the History of Literature. London: Curwen, Kane & Co.
- Greene, J. Reay, ed. (1892). Lectures on the History of Literature. London: Ellis and Elvey.
- Carlyle, Alexander, ed. (1898). Historical Sketches of Notable Persons and Events in the Reigns of James I and Charles I. London: Chapman and Hall Limited.
- Norton, Charles Eliot, ed. (1898). Two Note Books of Thomas Carlyle. New York: The Grolier Club.
- Copeland, Charles Townsend, ed. (1899). Letters of Thomas Carlyle to His Youngest Sister. Boston and New York: Houghton, Mifflin and Company.
- Jones, Samuel Arthur, ed. (1903). Collecteana. Canton, Pennsylvania: The Kirgate Press.
- Carlyle, Alexander, ed. (1904). New Letters of Thomas Carlyle. London: The Bodley Head.
- Carlyle, Alexander, ed. (1909). The Love Letters of Thomas Carlyle and Jane Welsh. 2 vols. London: The Bodley Head.
- Carlyle, Thomas (1922). "Notes of a Three-Days' Tour to the Netherlands". Cornhill Magazine. Vol. 53. pp. 626–640.
- Carlyle, Alexander, ed. (1923). Letters of Thomas Carlyle to John Stuart Mill, John Sterling and Robert Browning. London: T. Fisher Unwin LTD.
- Brooks, Richard Albert Edward, ed. (1940). Journey to Germany, Autumn 1858. New Haven: Yale University Press.
- Graham Jr., John, ed. (1950). Letters of Thomas Carlyle to William Graham. Princeton: Princeton University Press.
- Shine, Hill, ed. (1951). Carlyle's Unfinished History of German Literature. Lexington: University of Kentucky Press.
- Bliss, Trudy, ed. (1953). Letters to His Wife. London: Victor Gollancz Ltd.
- King, Marjorie P. (1954). ""Illudo Chartis": An Initial Study in Carlyle's Mode of Composition". The Modern Language Review. 49 (2): 164–175. doi:10.2307/3718901. ISSN 0026-7937. JSTOR 3718901.
- Baumgarten, Murray (1968). "Carlyle and "Spiritual Optics"". Victorian Studies. 11 (4): 503–522. ISSN 0042-5222. JSTOR 3825228.
- Marrs, Edwin W. Jr., ed. (1968). The Letters of Thomas Carlyle to His Brother Alexander: with Related Family Letters. Cambridge, Massachusetts: The Belknap Press of Harvard University Press.
- Clubbe, John, ed. (1974). Two Reminiscences of Thomas Carlyle. Durham, N.C.: Duke University Press. ISBN 978-0822303077.
- Fielding, K.J. (1979). "Unpublished Manuscripts – I: Carlyle Among the Cannibals". Carlyle Newsletter (1): 22–28. ISSN 0269-8226. JSTOR 44945570.
- Henderson, Heather, ed. (1979). Wooden-Headed Publishers and Locust-Swarms of Authors. University of Edinburgh.
- Campbell, Ian, ed. (1980). Thomas and Jane: Selected Letters from the Edinburgh University Library Collection. Edinburgh.
- Fielding, K.J. (1980). "Unpublished Manuscripts – II: Carlyle's Scenario for "Cromwell"". Carlyle Newsletter (2): 6–13. ISSN 0269-8226. JSTOR 44945576.
- Kaplan, Fred (1980). ""Phallus-Worship" (1848): Unpublished Manuscripts – III: A Response to the Revolution of 1848". Carlyle Newsletter (2): 19–23. ISSN 0269-8226. JSTOR 44945578.
- Carlyle, Thomas (1981). "The Guises". Victorian Studies. 25 (1): 13–80. ISSN 0042-5222. JSTOR 3827058.
- Trela, D. J. (1984). "Carlyle and the Beautiful People: An Unpublished Manuscript". Carlyle Newsletter (5): 36–41. ISSN 0269-8226. JSTOR 44937838.
- Tarr, Rodger L.; McClelland, Fleming, eds. (1986). The Collected Poems of Thomas and Jane Welsh Carlyle. Greenwood, Florida: The Penkevill Publishing Company.
- Fielding, K. J. (1991). "Carlyle Writes Local History: "Dumfries-Shire Three Hundred Years Ago"". Carlyle Annual (12): 3–7. ISSN 1050-3099. JSTOR 44945533.
- Fielding, K. J.; Neuberg, J. (1992). "New Notes for "The Letters": I. Carlyle's Sketch of Joseph Neuberg II. "Leave it Alone; Time Will Mend It"". Carlyle Annual (13): 3–15. ISSN 1050-3099. JSTOR 44945549.
- de L. Ryals, Clyde (1995). "Thomas Carlyle on the Mormons: An Unpublished Essay". Carlyle Studies Annual (15): 49–54. ISSN 1074-2670. JSTOR 44946088.
- Campbell, Ian (1996-01-01). "Peter Lithgow: New Fiction by Thomas Carlyle". Studies in Scottish Literature. 29 (1). ISSN 0039-3770.
- Hubbard, Tom (2005), "Carlyle, France and Germany in 1870", in Hubbard, Tom (2022), Invitation to the Voyage: Scotland, Europe and Literature, Rymour, pp. 44 – 46, ISBN 9-781739-596002

=== Scholarly editions ===
- Altick, Richard D., ed. (2000). Past and Present (Reprint ed.). New York: New York University Press.
- Cate, George Allen, ed. (1982). The Correspondence of Thomas Carlyle and John Ruskin. Stanford, California: Stanford University Press.
- Fielding, Kenneth J.; Campbell, Ian, eds. (2009). Reminiscences (Reprint ed.). Glasgow: Kennedy & Boyd.
- Goldberg, M. K.; Seigel, J. P., eds. (1983). Carlyle's Latter-Day Pamphlets. Canadian Federation for the Humanities.
- McSweenery, Kerry; Sabor, Peter, eds. (2008). Sartor Resartus. Oxford World's Classics. Oxford: Oxford University Press.
- Sanders, Charles Richard; Fielding, Kenneth J.; Ryals, Clyde de L.; Campbell, Ian; Christianson, Aileen; Clubbe, John; McIntosh, Sheila; Smith, Hilary; Sorensen, David, eds. (1970–2022). The Collected Letters of Thomas and Jane Welsh Carlyle. Durham, North Carolina: Duke University Press.
  - Kinser, Brent E. (ed.). "The Carlyle Letters Online: A Victorian Cultural Reference".
- Slater, Joseph, ed. (1964). The Correspondence of Emerson and Carlyle. New York and London: Columbia University Press.
- Sorensen, David R.; Kinser, Brent E.; Engel, Mark, eds. (2019). The French Revolution. Oxford World's Classics. Oxford: Oxford University Press.
- The Norman and Charlotte Strouse Edition of the Writings of Thomas Carlyle. 6 vols. Berkeley and Los Angeles: University of California Press. 1993–2022.

=== Memoirs, etc. ===
- Allingham, William (1907). William Allingham's Diary 1847–1889 (Paperback ed.). London: Centaur Press (published 2000).
- Baker, William (1976-01-01). "Herbert Spencer's unpublished reminiscences of Thomas Carlyle: The "Perfect owl of minerva for knowledge" on a "Poet without music"". Neophilologus. 60 (1): 145–152. doi:10.1007/BF01513592. ISSN 1572-8668. S2CID 161087774.
- Boyle, Mary (1902). "Carlyle". In Boyle, Sir Courtenay (ed.). Her Book. London: John Murray. pp. 267–268.
- Conway, Moncure D. (1881). Thomas Carlyle. London: Chatto & Windus.
- Duffy, Sir Charles Gavan (1892). Conversations with Carlyle. New York: Charles Scribner's Sons.
- Espinasse, Francis (1893). Literary Recollections and Sketches. London: Hodder and Stoughton.
- Fox, Caroline (1883). Pym, Horace N. (ed.). Memories of Old Friends: Being Extracts from the Journals and Letters of Caroline Fox of Penjerrick, Cornwall, from 1835 to 1871. London: Smith, Elder & Co.
- Higginson, Thomas Wentworth (1909). "Carlyle's Laugh". Carlyle's Laugh, and Other Surprises. Boston and New York: Houghton Mifflin Company. pp. 1–12.
- Knighton, William (1881). "Conversations with Carlyle". Contemporary Review (39): 904–920.
- Larkin, Henry (1881). "Carlyle, and Mrs. Carlyle: A Ten-Years' Reminiscence". The British Quarterly Review (74): 84–64.
- Masson, David (1885). Carlyle Personally and in His Writings.
- Norton, Charles Eliot (1886). "Recollections of Carlyle". The New Princeton Review. 2 (4): 1–19.
- Tyndall, John (1890). "Personal Recollections of Thomas Carlyle". New Fragments. New York: Appleton (published 1892). pp. 347–391.
- Symington, Andrew J. (1886). Some Personal Reminiscences of Carlyle.

== Biographies ==
- Boyle, Andrew, ed. (1913–1914). "Carlyle, Thomas". The Everyman Encyclopædia. Everyman's library Reference. Vol. Three. London: J. M. Dent & Sons, LTD. pp. 325–327.
- Campbell, Ian (1974). Thomas Carlyle (2nd Revised ed.). Glasgow, Scotland: Kennedy & Boyd (published 24 June 2011).
- Campbell, Ian (1987). "Thomas Carlyle". Dictionary of Literary Biography. Gale. Archived from the original on 2019-10-24.
- Fischer, Thomas A. (1882). Thomas Carlyle (in German).
- Froude, James Anthony (1882–1884). Thomas Carlyle. 4 vols. London: Longmans, Green, and Co.
- Garnett, Richard (1887). Life of Thomas Carlyle.
- Heffer, Simon (1996). Moral Desperado: A Life of Thomas Carlyle. London: Weidenfeld & Nicolson.
- Kaplan, Fred (1983). Thomas Carlyle: A Biography. Ithaca: Cornell University Press.
- Morrow, John (2006). Thomas Carlyle. New York: Hambledon Continuum. ISBN 978-1852855444.
- Neff, Emery (1932). Carlyle. New York: W. W. Norton & Company, Inc.
- Nichol, John (1904). Thomas Carlyle.
- Perry, Bliss (1915). Thomas Carlyle: How to Know Him. Indianapolis: The Bobbs-Merrill Company.
- Shepherd, Richard Herne (1881). Memoirs of the Life and Writings of Thomas Carlyle.
- Shine, Hill (1953). Carlyle's Early Reading, to 1834. Occasional Contributions. Vol. 57. Lexington: University of Kentucky Libraries.
- Sloan, J. M. (1904). Hollern, Mary (ed.). The Carlyle Country (2nd ed.). Sheffield, England: The Grimsay Press (published 20 May 2010).
- Stephen, Leslie (1887). "Carlyle, Thomas (1795-1881)" . In Stephen, Leslie (ed.). Dictionary of National Biography. Vol. 09. London: Smith, Elder & Co. pp. 111–127.
- Symons, Julian (1952). Thomas Carlyle: The Life and Ideas of a Prophet. New York: Oxford University Press.
- Wilson, David Alec (1923–1934). Carlyle. 6 vols. London: Kegan Paul, Trench, Trubner & Co., LTD.
- Wylie, William Howie (1881). Thomas Carlyle, the Man and His Books. London.

== Secondary sources ==
- Barfoot, C. C., ed. (1999). Victorian Keats and Romantic Carlyle: The Fusions and Confusions of Literary Periods. Amsterdam & Atlanta, GA: Rodopi. ISBN 9042005785.
- Birrell, Augustine (1885). "Carlyle". Obiter Dicta. New York: Chas. Scribner's Sons.
- Bishirjian, Richard J. (1976). "Carlyle's Political Religion". The Journal of Politics. 38 (1): 95–113. doi:10.2307/2128963. JSTOR 2128963. S2CID 153527096.
- Campell, Ian (1987). "Thomas Carlyle (1795–1881)". In Thesing, William B. (ed.). Victorian Prose Writers Before 1867. Dictionary of Literary Biography. Vol. 55. Detroit: Gale. pp. 46–64. ISBN 978-0810317338.
- Chandler, Alice (1970). A Dream of Order: The Medieval Ideal in Nineteenth-Century English Literature. Lincoln: University of Nebraska Press. ISBN 9780803207042.
- Clubbe, John, ed. (1976). Carlyle and His Contemporaries: Essays in Honor of Charles Richard Sanders. Durham, North Carolina: Duke University Press. ISBN 978-0822303404.
- Cole, J. A. (1964). Lord Haw-Haw: The Full Story of William Joyce. London: Faber and Faber. ISBN 9780571148608.
- Cumming, Mark, ed. (2004). The Carlyle Encyclopedia. Madison and Teaneck, NJ: Fairleigh Dickinson University Press. ISBN 978-0838637920.
- Drescher, Horst W., ed. (1983). Thomas Carlyle 1981: Papers Given at the International Thomas Carlyle Centenary Symposium. Scottish Studies. Frankfurt am Main: Lang. ISBN 978-3820473278.
- Dyer, Isaac Watson (1928). A Bibliography of Thomas Carlyle's Writings and Ana. New York: Burt Franklin (published 1968).
- Fielding, K. J.; Tarr, Rodger L., eds. (1976). Carlyle Past and Present: A Collection of New Essays. Vision Press. ISBN 978-0854783731.
- Harrold, Charles Frederick (1934). Carlyle and German Thought: 1819–1834. New Haven: Yale University Press.
- Jackson, Holbrook (1948). Dreamers of Dreams: The Rise and Fall of 19th Century Idealism. New York: Farrar, Straus and Company.
- Jessop, Ralph (1997). Carlyle and Scottish Thought. Macmillan Press.
- Joyce, William (1940). Twilight Over England. Berlin: Internationaler Verlag.
- Kerry, Paul E.; Hill, Marylu, eds. (2010). Thomas Carlyle Resartus: Reappraising Carlyle's Contribution to the Philosophy of History, Political Theory, and Cultural Criticism. Madison and Teaneck, NJ: Fairleigh Dickinson University Press. ISBN 978-0838642238.
- Kerry, Paul E.; Pionke, Albert D.; Dent, Megan, eds. (2018). Thomas Carlyle and the Idea of Influence. Madison and Teaneck, NJ: Fairleigh Dickinson University Press. ISBN 978-1683930662.
- LaValley, Albert J. (1968). Carlyle and the Idea of the Modern: Studies in Carlyle's Prophetic Literature and Its Relation to Blake, Nietzsche, Marx, and Others. New Haven and London: Yale University Press. ISBN 978-0300006766.
- Lea, F. A. (2017) [1943]. Carlyle: Prophet of To-day. Routledge Library Editions: Social and Political Thought in the Nineteenth Century. Vol. 2. Routledge. doi:10.4324/9781315563640. ISBN 978-1315563640.
- McCollum, Jonathon C. (2007-07-20). Thomas Carlyle, Fascism, and Frederick: From Victorian Prophet to Fascist Ideologue (MA thesis). Brigham Young University. hdl:1877/etd2044.
- Mendilow, Jonathan (1983). "The Neglected (I): Carlyle's Political Philosophy: Towards a Theory of Catch-All Extremism". Government and Opposition. 18 (1): 68–87. doi:10.1111/j.1477-7053.1983.tb00341.x. JSTOR 44483466. S2CID 145617742.
- Mendilow, Jonathan (1984). "Carlyle, Marx & the ILP: Alternative Routes to Socialism". Polity. 17 (2). The University of Chicago Press: 225–247. doi:10.2307/3234506. JSTOR 3234506. S2CID 147550498.
- Moldbug, Mencius (5 April 2016). Moldbug on Carlyle. Unqualified Reservations. ASIN B01DVJCCBQ.
- Moore, Carlisle (1957). "Thomas Carlyle". In Houtchens, Carolyn Washburn; Houtchens, Lawrence Huston (eds.). The English Romantic Poets & Essayists: A Review of Research and Criticism (Revised ed.). New York: New York University Press (published 1966).
- Norman, Edward (1987). The Victorian Christian Socialists. Cambridge: Cambridge University Press.
- Pierson, Stanley (1979). British Socialists: The Journey from Fantasy to Politics. Cambridge, Massachusetts: Harvard University Press. ISBN 978-0674082823.
- Plotz, John (2000). "Crowd Power: Chartism, Carlyle, and the Victorian Public Sphere". Representations. 70 (70): 87–114. doi:10.2307/2902894. JSTOR 2902894.
- Rosenberg, John D. (1985). Carlyle and the Burden of History. Cambridge, Mass.: Harvard University Press.
- Rosenberg, Philip (1974). The Seventh Hero: Thomas Carlyle and the Theory of Radical Activism. Cambridge, Mass.: Harvard University Press.
- Sanders, Charles Richard (1977). Carlyle's Friendships and Other Studies. Durham, N.C.: Duke University Press. ISBN 978-0822303893.
- Seigel, Jules Paul, ed. (1971). Thomas Carlyle: The Critical Heritage. The Critical Heritage Series. London: Routledge & Kegan Paul. ISBN 978-0710070906.
- Shepherd, Richard Herne (1881). The Bibliography of Carlyle. London: Elliot Stock.
- Shine, Hill (1971). Carlyle and the Saint-Simonians; the concept of historical periodicity. New York: Octagon Books. ISBN 978-0374973605.
- Sorensen, David R. (2009-03-01). ""Natural Supernaturalism": Carlyle's Redemption of the Past in The French Revolution". Revue LISA/LISA e-journal. Littératures, Histoire des Idées, Images, Sociétés du Monde Anglophone – Literature, History of Ideas, Images and Societies of the English-speaking World. VII (3): 442–451. doi:10.4000/lisa.132. ISSN 1762-6153.
- Sorensen, David R. (2012). ""The Great Pioneer of National Socialist Philosophy"?: Carlyle and Twentieth-Century Totalitarianism". Studies in the Literary Imagination. 45 (1): 43–66. doi:10.1353/sli.2012.0000. ISSN 2165-2678. S2CID 153751576.
- Sorensen, David; Kinser, Brent E. (11 January 2018). "Thomas Carlyle". Oxford Bibliographies. doi:10.1093/OBO/9780199799558-0037.
- Tarr, Rodger L. (1976). Thomas Carlyle: A Bibliography of English Language Criticism, 1824–1974. Charlottesville: University Press of Virginia. ISBN 978-0813906959.
- Tarr, Rodger L. (1989). Thomas Carlyle: A Descriptive Bibliography. Pittsburgh Series in Bibliography. Pittsburgh: University of Pittsburgh Press. ISBN 978-0822936077.
- Tennyson, G. B. (1965). Sartor Called Resartus: The Genesis, Structure, and Style of Thomas Carlyle's First Major Work. Princeton, New Jersey: Princeton University Press. LCCN 65017162.
- Tennyson, G. B. (1973). "Thomas Carlyle". In DeLaura, David J. (ed.). Victorian Prose: A Guide to Research. New York: The Modern Language Association of America. pp. 33–104. ISBN 978-0873522502.
- Trela, D. J.; Tarr, Rodger L., eds. (1997). The Critical Response to Thomas Carlyle's Major Works. Critical Responses in Arts and Letters. Westport, Conn.: Greenwood Press. ISBN 978-0313291074.
- Vanden Bossche, Chris R. (1991). Carlyle and the Search for Authority. Columbus: Ohio State University Press.
- Vida, Elizabeth M. (1993). Romantic Affinities: German Authors and Carlyle; A Study in the History of Ideas. Heritage. University of Toronto Press. ISBN 978-1487573270. JSTOR 10.3138/j.ctvfrxchd.
- Vijn, Dr. J. P. (2017). Carlyle, Jung, and Modern Man: Jungian Concepts as Key to Carlyle's Mind (PDF). H. Brinkman-Vijn. Archived from the original (PDF) on 13 December 2022.
- Wellek, René (1965). Confrontations: studies in the intellectual and literary relations between Germany, England, and the United States during the nineteenth century. Princeton, N.J.: Princeton University Press.
- Young, Louise Merwin (1971). Thomas Carlyle and the Art of History. New York: Octagon Books. ISBN 978-0374988418.
