= Philosophy of Thomas Carlyle =

Philosophy of 19th-century British thinker Thomas Carlyle

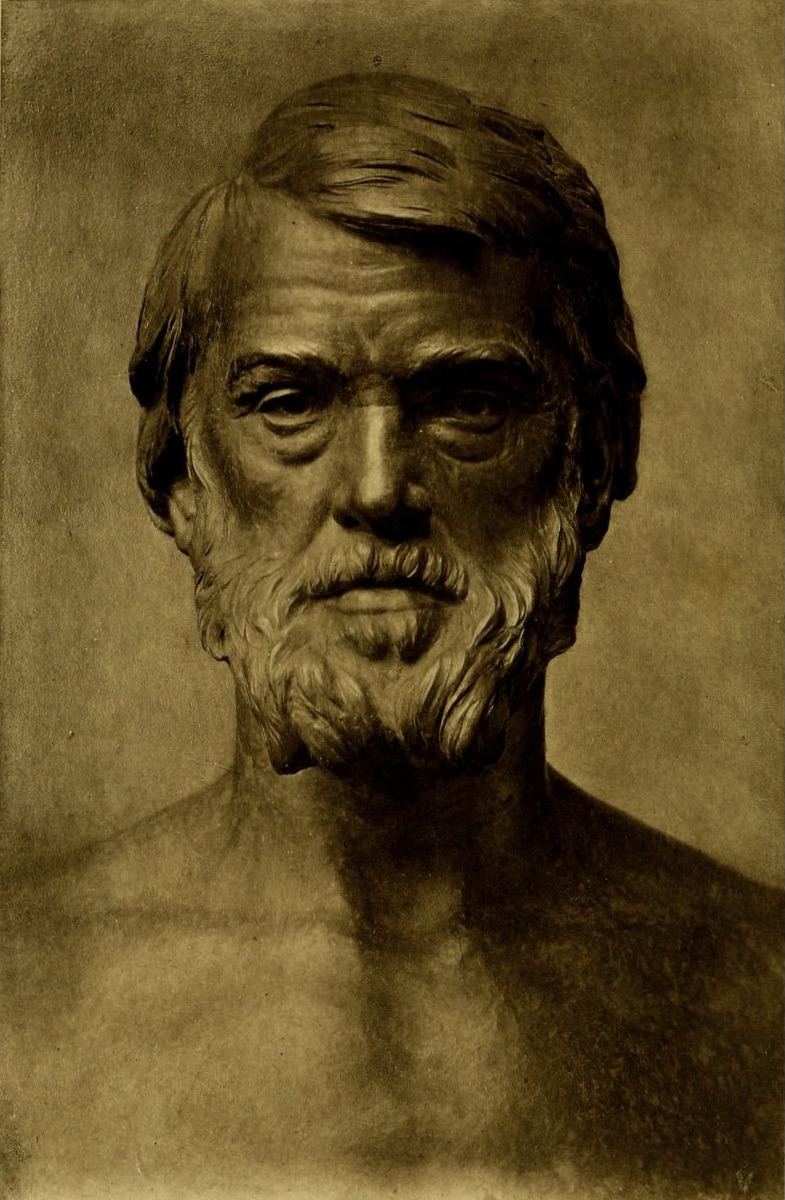
Bust of Carlyle in the Hall of Heroes at the Wallace Monument, 1891

Thomas Carlyle's religious, historical and political thought has long been the subject of debate. In the 19th century, he was "an enigma" according to Ian Campbell in the Dictionary of Literary Biography, being "variously regarded as sage and impious, a moral leader, a moral desperado, (Note: Matthew Arnold described Carlyle as such in an 1849 letter to Clough.) a radical, a conservative, a Christian." Carlyle continues to perplex scholars in the 21st century, as Kenneth J. Fielding quipped in 2005: "A problem in writing about Carlyle and his beliefs is that people think that they know what they are."

Carlyle identified two philosophical precepts. The first, "annihilation of self (Selbsttödtung)", is derived from Novalis. The second, "Renunciation (Entsagen)", is derived from Goethe. Through Selbsttödtung (annihilation of self), liberation from self-imposed material constraints, which arise from the misguided pursuit of unfulfilling happiness and result in atheism and egoism, is achieved. With this liberation and Entsagen (renunciation, or humility) as the guiding principle of conduct, it is seen that "there is in man a HIGHER than Love of Happiness: he can do without Happiness, and instead thereof find Blessedness!" "Blessedness" refers to the serving of duty and the sense that the universe and everything in it, including humanity, is meaningful and united as one whole. Awareness of the fraternal bond of mankind brings the discovery of the "Divine Depth of Sorrow", the feeling of "an infinite Love, an infinite Pity" for one's "fellowman".

== Natural Supernaturalism ==
Carlyle rejected doctrines which profess to fully know the true nature of God, believing that to possess such knowledge is impossible. In an 1835 letter, he answered Faust's question, "Wer darf ihn NENNEN [Who dares name him]? I dare not, and do not", while rejecting charges of pantheism and expressing the empirical basis of his belief:

Finally assure yourself I am neither Pagan nor Turk, nor circumcised Jew, but an unfortunate Christian individual resident at Chelsea in this year of Grace; neither Pantheist nor Pottheist, nor any Theist or ist whatsoever; having the most decided contem[pt] for all manner of System-builders and Sectfounders—as far as contempt may be com[patible] with so mild a nature; feeling well beforehand (taught by long experience) that all such are and even must be wrong. By God's blessing, one has got two eyes to look with; also a mind capable of knowing, of believing: that is all the creed I will at this time insist on.

With this empirical basis, Carlyle conceived of a "new Mythus", Natural Supernaturalism. Following Kant's distinction between Reason (Vernunft) and Understanding (Verstand) in Critique of Pure Reason (1781), Carlyle held the former to be the superior faculty, allowing for insight into the transcendent. Hence, Carlyle saw all things symbols, or clothes, representing the eternal and infinite. In Sartor Resartus, he defines the "Symbol proper" as that in which there is "some embodiment and revelation of the Infinite; the Infinite is made to blend itself with the Finite, to stand visible, and as it were, attainable there." Carlyle writes: "All visible things are emblems . . . all Emblematic things are properly Clothes". Therefore, "Language is the Flesh-Garment, the Body, of Thought", and "the Universe is but one vast Symbol of God", as is "man himself". In On Heroes, Carlyle spoke of

the sacred mystery of the Universe; what Goethe calls 'the open secret.' (Note: Goethe used the concept in his Maximen und Reflexionen, number 201, and in Wilhelm Meister's Travels and "The Tale", both of which were translated by Carlyle.) . . . open to all, seen by almost none! That divine mystery, which lies everywhere in all Beings, 'the Divine Idea of the World,' that which lies at 'the bottom of Appearance,' as Fichte styles it; (Note: Taken from Fichte's "'Ueber das Wesen des Gelehrten, On the Nature of the Literary Man.'") of which all Appearance . . . is but the vesture, the embodiment that renders it visible.

The "Divine Idea of the World", the belief in an eternal, omnipresent and metaphysical order which lies in the "unknown Deep" of nature, is at the core of Natural Supernaturalism.

== Bible of Universal History ==
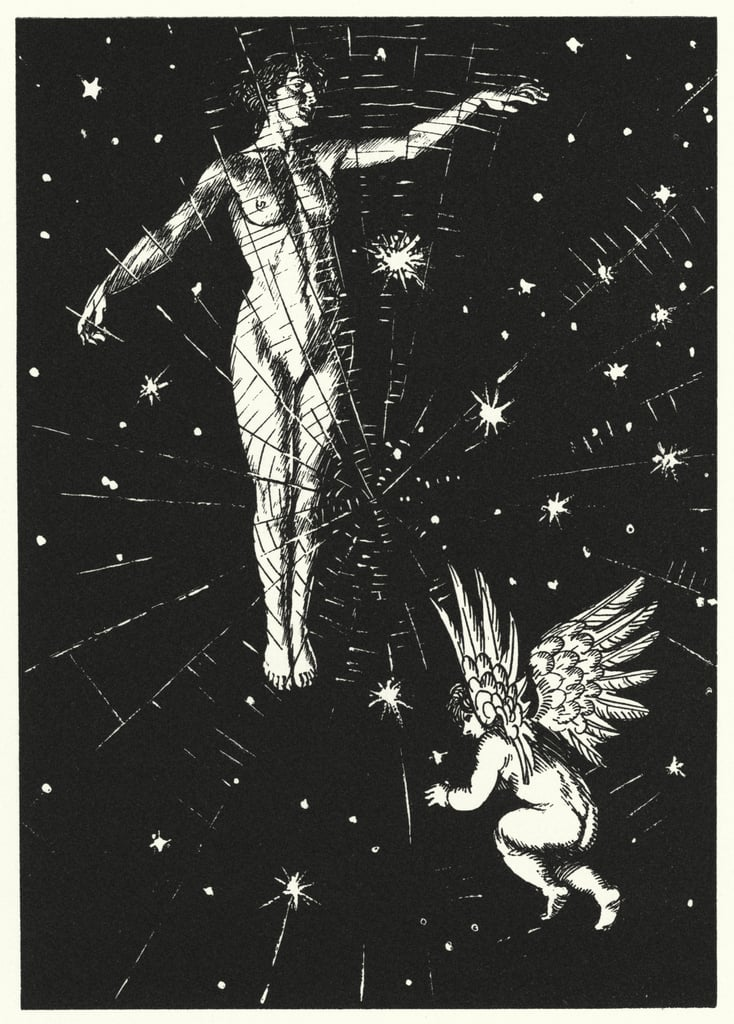
"Organic Filaments", 1898 illustration by E. J. Sullivan for Sartor Resartus

Carlyle revered what he called the "Bible of Universal History", a "real Prophetic Manuscript" which incorporates the poetic and the factual to show the divine reality of existence. For Carlyle, "the right interpretation of Reality and History" is the highest form of poetry, and "true History" is "the only possible Epic". He imaged the "burning of a World-Phoenix" to represent the cyclical nature of civilisations as they undergo death and "Palingenesia, or Newbirth". Periods of creation and destruction do overlap, however, and before a World-Phoenix is completely reduced to ashes, there are "organic filaments, mysteriously spinning themselves", elements of regeneration amidst degeneration, such as hero-worship, literature, and the unbreakable connection between all human beings. Akin to the seasons, societies have autumns of dying faiths, winters of decadent atheism, springs of burgeoning belief and brief summers of true religion and government. Carlyle saw history since the Reformation as a process of decay culminating in the French Revolution, out of which renewal must come, "for lower than that savage Sansculottism men cannot go." Heroism is central to Carlyle's view of history. He saw individual actors as the prime movers of historical events: "The History of the world is but the Biography of great men."

In the area of historiography, Carlyle focused on the complexity involved in faithfully representing both the facts of history and their meaning. He perceived "a fatal discrepancy between our manner of observing [passing things], and their manner of occurring", since "History is the essence of innumerable Biographies" and every individual's experience varies, as does the "general inward condition of Life" throughout the ages. Furthermore, even the best of historians, by necessity, presents history as a "series" of "successive" instances (a narrative) rather than as a "group" of "simultaneous" things done (an action), which is how they occurred in reality. Every single event is related to all others before and after it in "an ever-living, ever-working Chaos of Being". Events are multi-dimensional, possessing the physical properties of "breadth", "depth" and "length", and are ultimately based on "Passion and Mystery", characteristics that narrative, which is by its nature one-dimensional, fails to render. Emphasising the disconnect between the typical discipline of history and history as lived experience, Carlyle writes: "Narrative is linear, Action is solid." He distinguishes between the "Artist in History" and the "Artisan in History". The "Artisan" works with historical facts in an atomised, mechanical way, while the "Artist" brings to his craft "an Idea of the Whole", through which the essential truth of history is successfully communicated to the reader.

== Heroarchy (Government of Heroes) ==
As with history, Carlyle believed that "Society is founded on Hero-worship. All dignities of rank, on which human association rests, are what we may call a Heroarchy (Government of Heroes)". This fundamental assertion about the nature of society itself informed his political doctrine. Noting that the etymological root meaning of the word "King" is "Can" or "Able", Carlyle put forth his ideal government in "The Hero as King":

Find in any country the Ablest Man that exists there; raise him to the supreme place, and loyally reverence him: you have a perfect government for that country; no ballot-box, parliamentary eloquence, voting, constitution-building, or other machinery whatsoever can improve it a whit. It is in the perfect state; an ideal country.

Carlyle did not believe in hereditary monarchy but in a kingship based on merit. He continues:

The Ablest Man; he means also the truest-hearted, justest, the Noblest Man: what he tells us to do must be precisely the wisest, fittest, that we could anywhere or anyhow learn;—the thing which it will in all ways behoove us, with right loyal thankfulness, and nothing doubting, to do! Our doing and life were then, so far as government could regulate it, well regulated; that were the ideal of constitutions.

It was for this reason that he regarded the Reformation, the English Civil War and the French Revolution as triumphs of truth over falsehood, despite their undermining of necessary societal institutions.

== Chivalry of Labour ==
Carlyle advocated a new kind of hero for the age of industrialisation: the Captain of Industry, who would re-imbue workhouses with dignity and honour. These Captains would make up a new "Aristocracy of Talent", or "Government of the Wisest". Instead of competition and "Cash Payment", which had become "the universal sole nexus of man to man", the Captain of Industry would oversee the Chivalry of Labour, in which loyal labourers and enlightened employers are joined "in veritable brotherhood, sonhood, by quite other and deeper ties than those of temporary day's wages!"

== Glossary of terms ==
The 1907 edition of The Nuttall Encyclopædia contains entries on the following Carlylean terms:

Cash Nexus
The reduction (under capitalism) of all human relationships, but especially relations of production, to monetary exchange.

Dismal Science
Carlyle's name for the political economy that with self-complacency leaves everything to settle itself by the law of supply and demand, as if that were all the law and the prophets. The name is applied to every science that affects to dispense with the spiritual as a ruling factor in human affairs.
Eternities, The Conflux of
Carlyle's expressive phrase for Time, as in every moment of it a centre in which all the forces to and from Eternity meet and unite, so that by no past and no future can we be brought nearer to Eternity than where we at any moment of Time are; the Present Time, the youngest born of Eternity, being the child and heir of all the Past times with their good and evil, and the parent of all the Future, the import of which (see Matt. xvi. 27) it is accordingly the first and most sacred duty of every successive age, and especially the leaders of it, to know and lay to heart as the only link by which Eternity lays hold of it and it of Eternity.
Everlasting No, The
Carlyle's name for the spirit of unbelief in God, especially as it manifested itself in his own, or rather Teufelsdröckh's, warfare against it; the spirit, which, as embodied in the Mephistopheles of Goethe, is for ever denying—der stets verneint—the reality of the divine in the thoughts, the character, and the life of humanity, and has a malicious pleasure in scoffing at everything high and noble as hollow and void.
Everlasting Yea, The
Carlyle's name for the spirit of faith in God in an express attitude of clear, resolute, steady, and uncompromising antagonism to the Everlasting No, on the principle that there is no such thing as faith in God except in such antagonism, no faith except in such antagonism against the spirit opposed to God.
Gigman
Carlyle's name for a man who prides himself on, and pays all respect to, respectability; derived from a definition once given in a court of justice by a witness who, having described a person as respectable, was asked by the judge in the case what he meant by the word; "one that keeps a gig", was the answer.
Immensities, Centre of
an expression of Carlyle's to signify that wherever any one is, he is in touch with the whole universe of being, and is, if he knew it, as near the heart of it there as anywhere else he can be.
Logic Spectacles
Carlyle's name for eyes that can only discern the external relations of things, but not the inner nature of them.
Natural Supernaturalism
Carlyle's name in "Sartor" for the supernatural found latent in the natural, and manifesting itself in it, or of the miraculous in the common and everyday course of things; name of a chapter which, says Dr. Stirling, "contains the very first word of a higher philosophy as yet spoken in Great Britain, the very first English word towards the restoration and rehabilitation of the dethroned Upper Powers"; recognition at bottom, as the Hegelian philosophy teaches, and the life of Christ certifies, of the finiting of the infinite in the transitory forms of space and time.
Silence, Worship of
Carlyle's name for the sacred respect for restraint in speech till "thought has silently matured itself, ... to hold one's tongue till some meaning lie behind to set it wagging", a doctrine which many misunderstand, almost wilfully, it would seem; silence being to him the very womb out of which all great things are born.

== Influence ==
=== Philosophy ===
J. H. Muirhead wrote that Carlyle "exercised an influence in England and America that no other did upon the course of philosophical thought of his time". Ralph Jessop has shown that Carlyle powerfully forwarded the Scottish School of Common Sense and reinforced it by way of further engagement with German idealism. Examining his influence on late 19th- and early 20th-century philosophers, Alexander Jordan concluded that "Carlyle emerges as far-and-away the most prominent figure in a tradition of Scottish philosophy that stretched across three centuries and which culminated in British Idealism". His formative influence on British idealism touched its nearly every aspect, including its theology, its moral and ethical philosophy and its social and political thought. Leading British idealist F. H. Bradley cited from the "Everlasting Yea" chapter of Sartor Resartus in his argument against utilitarianism: "Love not Pleasure; love God."

Carlyle had a foundational influence on American Transcendentalism. Virtually every member followed him with enthusiasm, including Amos Bronson Alcott, Louisa May Alcott, Orestes Brownson, William Henry Channing, Emerson, Margaret Fuller, Frederic Henry Hedge, Henry James Sr., Thoreau, and George Ripley. James Freeman Clarke wrote that "He did not seem to be giving us a new creed, so much as inspiring us with a new life."

Chandler writes that "Carlyle's contribution to English medievalism was first to make the contrast between modern and medieval England sharper and more horrifying than it had ever been." Secondly, he "gave new direction to the practical application of medievalism, transferring its field of action from agriculture, which was no longer the center of English life, to manufacturing, in which its lessons could be extremely valuable."

G. K. Chesterton posited that "Out of [Carlyle] flows most of the philosophy of Nietzsche," a view held by many; the connection has been studied since the late-nineteenth century. But Nietzsche rejected this.

Carlyle influenced the Young Poland movement, particularly its main thought leaders Stanisław Brzozowski and Antoni Lange. In Romania, Titu Maiorescu of Junimea spread Carlyle's works, influencing Constantin Antoniade and others, including Panait Mușoiu, Constantin Rădulescu-Motru and Ion Th. Simionescu.

Percival Chubb delivered an address on Carlyle to The Ethical Society of St. Louis in 1910. It was the first in a series entitled "Forerunners of Our Faith".

=== Historiography ===
David R. Sorensen affirms that Carlyle "redeemed the study of history at a moment when it was being threatened by a host of convergent forces, including religious dogmatism, relativism, utilitarianism, Saint-Simonianism and Comtism" by defending the "miraculous dimension of the past" from attempts to make "history a science of progress, philosophy a justification of self-interest, and faith a matter of social convenience." James Anthony Froude attributed his decision to become an historian to Carlyle's influence. John Mitchel's Life of Aodh O'Neill, Prince of Ulster (1845) has been called "an early incursion of Carlylean thought into the romantic construction of the Irish nation". Standish James O'Grady's presentation of a heroic past in his History of Ireland (1878–80) was strongly influenced by Carlyle. Wilhelm Dilthey deemed Carlyle "the greatest English writer of the century". Carlyle's histories were also praised by Heinrich von Treitschke, Wilhelm Windelband, George Peabody Gooch, Pieter Geyl, Charles Firth, Nicolae Iorga, Vasile Pârvan and Andrei Oțetea. Others were hostile to Carlyle's method, such as Thomas Babington Macaulay, Leopold von Ranke, Lord Acton, Hippolyte Taine and Jules Michelet.

Sorensen says that "modern historians and historiographers owe a debt to [Carlyle] that few are prepared to acknowledge". Among those few is C. V. Wedgwood, who called him "one of the great masters." Another is John Philipps Kenyon, who noted that "he has commanded the respect of historians as diverse as James Anthony Froude, G. M. Trevelyan and Hugh Trevor-Roper." Richard Cobb called Carlyle's works "GREAT history".

== Sources ==
- Campbell, Ian (1987). "Thomas Carlyle (1795–1881)". In Thesing, William B. (ed.). Victorian Prose Writers Before 1867. Dictionary of Literary Biography. Vol. 55. Detroit: Gale. pp. 46–64. ISBN 978-0810317338.
- Chandler, Alice (1970). A Dream of Order: The Medieval Ideal in Nineteenth-Century English Literature. Lincoln: University of Nebraska Press. ISBN 9780803207042.
- Cumming, Mark, ed. (2004). The Carlyle Encyclopedia. Madison and Teaneck, NJ: Fairleigh Dickinson University Press. ISBN 978-0838637920.
- Fielding, K.J. (1980). "Unpublished Manuscripts – II: Carlyle's Scenario for "Cromwell"". Carlyle Newsletter (2): 6–13. ISSN 0269-8226. JSTOR 44945576.
- Huggins, Michael (2012). "A Strange Case of Hero-Worship: John Mitchel and Thomas Carlyle". Studi irlandesi. A Journal of Irish Studies. 2 (2): 329–352. doi:10.13128/SIJIS-2239-3978-12430. hdl:10034/322207. Archived from the original on 26 November 2020.
- Jessop, Ralph (1997). Carlyle and Scottish Thought. Macmillan Press.
- Kerry, Paul E.; Hill, Marylu, eds. (2010). Thomas Carlyle Resartus: Reappraising Carlyle's Contribution to the Philosophy of History, Political Theory, and Cultural Criticism. Madison and Teaneck, NJ: Fairleigh Dickinson University Press. ISBN 978-0838642238.
- Kerry, Paul E.; Pionke, Albert D.; Dent, Megan, eds. (2018). Thomas Carlyle and the Idea of Influence. Madison and Teaneck, NJ: Fairleigh Dickinson University Press. ISBN 978-1683930662.
- Sanders, Charles Richard; Fielding, Kenneth J.; Ryals, Clyde de L.; Campbell, Ian; Christianson, Aileen; Clubbe, John; McIntosh, Sheila; Smith, Hilary; Sorensen, David, eds. (1970–2022). The Collected Letters of Thomas and Jane Welsh Carlyle. Durham, North Carolina: Duke University Press.
- Sorensen, David R. (2009-03-01). ""Natural Supernaturalism": Carlyle's Redemption of the Past in The French Revolution". Revue LISA/LISA e-journal. Littératures, Histoire des Idées, Images, Sociétés du Monde Anglophone – Literature, History of Ideas, Images and Societies of the English-speaking World. VII (3): 442–451. doi:10.4000/lisa.132. ISSN 1762-6153.
- Tennyson, G. B. (1973). "Thomas Carlyle". In DeLaura, David J. (ed.). Victorian Prose: A Guide to Research. New York: The Modern Language Association of America. pp. 33–104. ISBN 978-0873522502.
- The Norman and Charlotte Strouse Edition of the Writings of Thomas Carlyle. 6 vols. Berkeley and Los Angeles: University of California Press. 1993–2022.
- Traill, Henry Duff, ed. (1896–1899). The Works of Thomas Carlyle in Thirty Volumes. London: Chapman and Hall.
  - Vol. I. Sartor Resartus: The Life and Opinions of Herr Teufelsdröckh in Three Books (1831)
  - Vols. II–IV. The French Revolution: A History (1837)
  - Vol. V. On Heroes, Hero-Worship, and the Heroic in History (1841)
  - Vols. VI–IX. Oliver Cromwell's Letters and Speeches: with Elucidations (1845)
  - Vol. X. Past and Present (1843)
  - Vol. XI. The Life of John Sterling (1851)
  - Vols. XII–XIX. History of Friedrich II. of Prussia, Called Frederick the Great (1858–1865)
  - Vol. XX. Latter-Day Pamphlets (1850)
  - Vols. XXI–XXII. German Romance: Translations from the German, with Biographical and Critical Notices (1827)
  - Vols. XXIII–XXIV. Wilhelm Meister's Apprenticeship and Travels, Translated from the German of Goethe (1824)
  - Vol. XXV. The Life of Friedrich Schiller, Comprehending an Examination of His Works (1825)
  - Vols. XXVI–XXX. Critical and Miscellaneous Essays
- Vijn, Dr. J. P. (2017). Carlyle, Jung, and Modern Man: Jungian Concepts as Key to Carlyle's Mind (PDF). H. Brinkman-Vijn. Archived from the original (PDF) on 13 December 2022.
- Young, Louise Merwin (1971). Thomas Carlyle and the Art of History. New York: Octagon Books. ISBN 978-0374988418.
