= Condition-of-England question =

Phrase coined by Thomas Carlyle describing an 1839 English political debate

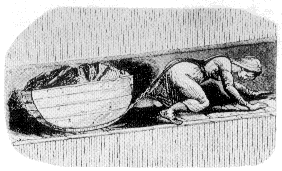
The working conditions for "drawers" exemplify some of the changes following the Industrial Revolution.

The Condition-of-England question was a debate in the Victorian era over the issue of the English working class during the Industrial Revolution. It was first proposed by Thomas Carlyle in his essay Chartism (1839). After assessing Chartism as "the bitter discontent grown fierce and mad, the wrong condition therefore or the wrong disposition, of the Working Classes of England", Carlyle proceeds to ask:

What means this bitter discontent of the Working Classes? Whence comes it, whither goes it? Above all, at what price, on what terms, will it probably consent to depart from us and die into rest? These are questions.

The division of society and the poverty of the majority began to dominate the minds of the intelligentsia following the 1832 Reform Act. They called this the "Condition-of-England Question". This was closely linked to a growing sense of anger at the culture of amateurism in official circles which produced this misery. The question preoccupied both Whigs and Tories. The historian John Prest has written that the early 1840s witnessed "the middle of structural changes in the economy, which led many to question whether the country had taken a wrong turning. Would manufacturing towns ever be loyal? Was poverty eating up capital? Was it safe to depend upon imports for food and raw materials? Could the fleet keep the seas open? Or should government encourage emigration and require those who remained behind to support themselves by spade husbandry? These were the 'condition-of-England' questions".

== Background ==
Before Carlyle, William Cobbett had made similar critiques of the industrial revolution and in defense of the poor. Raymond Williams writes that Carlyle's question, "Is the condition of the English working people wrong; so wrong that rational working men cannot, will not, and even should not rest quiet under it?" is "Cobbett's question, and in Cobbett's manner." However, Cobbett's criticisms focused on physical want above all else, whereas Carlyle decried not only industrial England's material but its spiritual malnourishment.

The phrase "Condition-of-England Question" was first used by Carlyle in Chartism (1839), which significantly contributed to the emergence of a series of debates about the spiritual and material foundations of England and had a great effect on a number of writers of fiction in the Victorian era and after. Carlyle was concerned with the "two nations theme", the rich and the poor. Likewise, a number of Victorian condition-of England novelists, particularly Benjamin Disraeli, Elizabeth Gaskell, Charles Dickens, and Charles Kingsley, attempted with varying effect, to persuade the reading public to look for ways of reducing the gap between the "two nations". Carlyle contributed to the awakening of social conscience among the reading public and understood the social and political importance of literature. He attacked the growing materialism of Victorian society and its laissez-faire doctrine. In his attacks on the wealthy, Carlyle anticipated some of the ideas of the condition-of England novels. He also inspired social reformers, such as John Ruskin and William Morris.

== "Signs of the Times" and the Condition-of-England question ==
In June 1829, the Edinburgh Review published Carlyle's "Signs of the Times", in which he anticipates the Condition-of-England Question he raised a decade later in Chartism (1839) and Past and Present (1843). G. B. Tennyson notes: "Carlyle more than any man before him perceived the changes being wrought by the Industrial Revolution." He criticised the ethos of the Industrial Revolution, which, he believed, was destroying human individuality. He expressed his distrust of the spirit of the "mechanical age", which was manifested not only in the technical progress of English society but also in an overwhelming feeling of lack of mental or spiritual vigour and enthusiasm: "The King has virtually abdicated; the Church is a widow, without jointure; public principle is gone; private honesty is going; society, in short, is in fact falling to pieces; and a time of unmixed evil is come on us." The essay was aimed to draw the attention of the reading public to the spiritual price of social change, caused particularly by the frenetic industrialisation. In "Signs of the Times", Carlyle warned that the Industrial Revolution was turning people into mechanical automatons devoid of individuality and spirituality. For Carlyle, machine and mechanisation had double meaning: they meant literally new technical devices, but also metaphorically mechanistic thought that suppresses human freedom. Carlyle strongly criticised the mechanisation of the human spirit and indicated the high moral costs of industrial change.

In this sermon-like essay, Carlyle led a crusade against scientific materialism, Utilitarianism and the laissez-faire system. He believed that the freedom of the emerging mechanical society in England was a delusion because it made workers into greater slaves than their ancient counterparts had been and because mechanization of society threatened the human ability to think and act creatively.

In "Signs of the Times", Carlyle tried to reshape public opinion about the present Condition of England, which he found unbearable. His criticism of the "mechanical society" produced a memorable narrative in Charles Dickens's novel Hard Times, whose subtitle For These Times is indebted to Carlyle's essay.

== Chartism ==
Carlyle raised the condition-of-England question in Chartism, in which he expressed his sympathy for the poor and the industrial class in England and argued the need for a more profound reform. He noticed a discrepancy between a new form of economic activity called "industrialism", which promised general welfare, and a dramatic degradation in the living conditions of the urban poor.

Carlyle, who had studied extensively the causes of the French Revolution, was apprehensive about England's future. He presented Chartism as a symptom of a disease that affected England. The effect of it could be a revolution if government did not improve the living conditions of the labouring classes. A cure for this disease is, according to Carlyle, a "real aristocracy" which can lead the working class through the vicissitudes of modern history. Carlyle looked for a new type of "unclassed" aristocracy because he was critical about both an idle landowning aristocracy and a working aristocracy submerged in Mammonism, who instead of being "captains of industry", are "a gang of industrial buccaneers and pirates".

== Past and Present ==
Past and Present (1843) was written as a response to the economic crisis which began in the early 1840s. This book, like its predecessor Chartism and Latter-Day Pamphlets (1850), presents a further analysis of the condition-of-England question. Carlyle contrasted the medieval past and the turbulent Victorian present of the 1830s and 1840s. For him, the latter was a time of uncontrolled industrialisation, worship of money, exploitation of the weak, low wages, poverty, unemployment and riots, which would bring England to self-destruction. Carlyle expresses his critical opinion about the Condition of England in an elevated, prophetic language. Despite England's abundant resources, the poor classes are living in deprivation. He shows a depressing picture of the daily life of the workers, many of whom are unable to find meaningful work.

Carlyle's solution was the same as that proposed in Sartor Resartus (1832)—a spiritual rebirth of both the individual and society. The two sections of the book show the contrasting visions of the past and the present. His idealised vision of the past is based on the chronicle of the English monk Jocelyn de Brakelond (died 1211), who described the life of the abbot Samson of Tottington and his monks of Bury St. Edmund's monastery. Carlyle shows the organisation of life and work of the medieval monks as an authentic idyll, whereas he finds contemporary life increasingly unbearable due to the lack of true leadership.

Carlyle argues that a new "Aristocracy of Talent" should take the lead in the country, and the English people must themselves choose true heroes and not sham-heroes or quacks. In the third chapter of the fourth book of Past and Present, Carlyle makes three practical suggestions for the improvement of social conditions in England. He calls for the introduction of legal hygienic measures, improvement of education and promotion of emigration. Although the first two proposals were soon adopted, the third proposal affected mainly the Irish and Scottish people, and, in a smaller degree, the English population.

== Bibliography ==
- Carlyle, Thomas (1904). "Chartism". Critical and Miscellaneous Essays volume IV. The Works of Thomas Carlyle in Thirty Volumes. Vol. 29. New York: Charles Scribner's Sons. pp. 118–204.
- Cross, Maurice, ed. (1833). "Sign of the Times". Selections from The Edinburgh Review. Vol. 2. London: Longman, Rees, Orme, Brown, Green, & Longman. pp. 490–506.
- Cumming, Mark, ed. (2004). The Carlyle Encyclopedia. Madison and Teaneck, New Jersey: Fairleigh Dickinson University Press. ISBN 978-0-8386-3792-0.
- Nixon, Jude V. (2008). "'If all had bread': Father Gerard Hopkins, the Condition of England Question and the Poor of Nazareth House". The Hopkins Quarterly. 35 (1/2): 19–46. ISSN 0094-9086. JSTOR 45241472.
- Swift, Roger (2001). "Thomas Carlyle, 'Chartism', and the Irish in Early Victorian England". Victorian Literature and Culture. 29 (1): 67–83. doi:10.1017/S1060150301291050. ISSN 1060-1503. JSTOR 25058540. S2CID 161831040.
- Williams, Raymond (1966). Culture and Society: 1780–1950. New York: Harper and Row. p. 78.
- Wright, Laurence Stuart (1985). "Carlyle and the Condition-Of-England: Myth Versus Mechanism". Theoria: A Journal of Social and Political Theory (65): 65–74. ISSN 0040-5817. JSTOR 41801738.
