= History of Friedrich II. of Prussia, Called Frederick the Great =

1858 biography by Thomas Carlyle

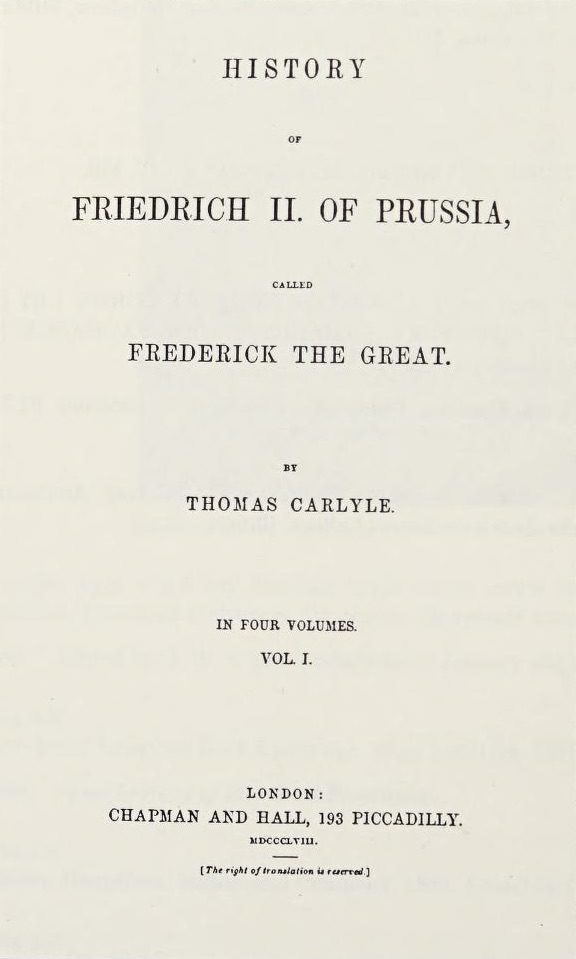
- Title page of the first English edition
- Author: Thomas Carlyle
- Language: English
- Subject: Frederick the Great
- Published: 1858–1865
- Publisher: Chapman and Hall

History of Friedrich II. of Prussia, Called Frederick the Great is a biography of Friedrich II of Prussia by the Scottish essayist, historian and philosopher Thomas Carlyle. It was first published in six volumes from 1858 to 1865.

== Composition and publication ==
Carlyle's interest in Frederick began when he read a history of him in 1819 and became fond of quoting his saying "Another time we will do better." He first expressed his desire to write about Frederick in a letter addressed to George Gleig dated 21 May 1830, wherein he made the following (unsuccessful) proposal:

Frederick the Great, as an Author, Soldier, King and Man, well deserves to have his History written; better perhaps than Charles XII, whose Biography by Voltaire has always seemed to me one of the most delightful Books. Let your Publishers offer me Three hundred pounds, and time to heat the historico-biographical crucible and fill it and fuse it properly, and I will give them the best single Volume I can on the brave Fritz: I think it might be ready before this time twelvemonth; and very probably I might go to Germany in winter to inquire into it better.
This is the most eligible enterprise I can think of at present: if you can arrange your side of it on these terms, I shall be very happy to hear so, as soon as possible, and proceed forthwith to take measures for performing mine. I do believe, a rather good Book might be written on the subject; at all events, I am willing to try.

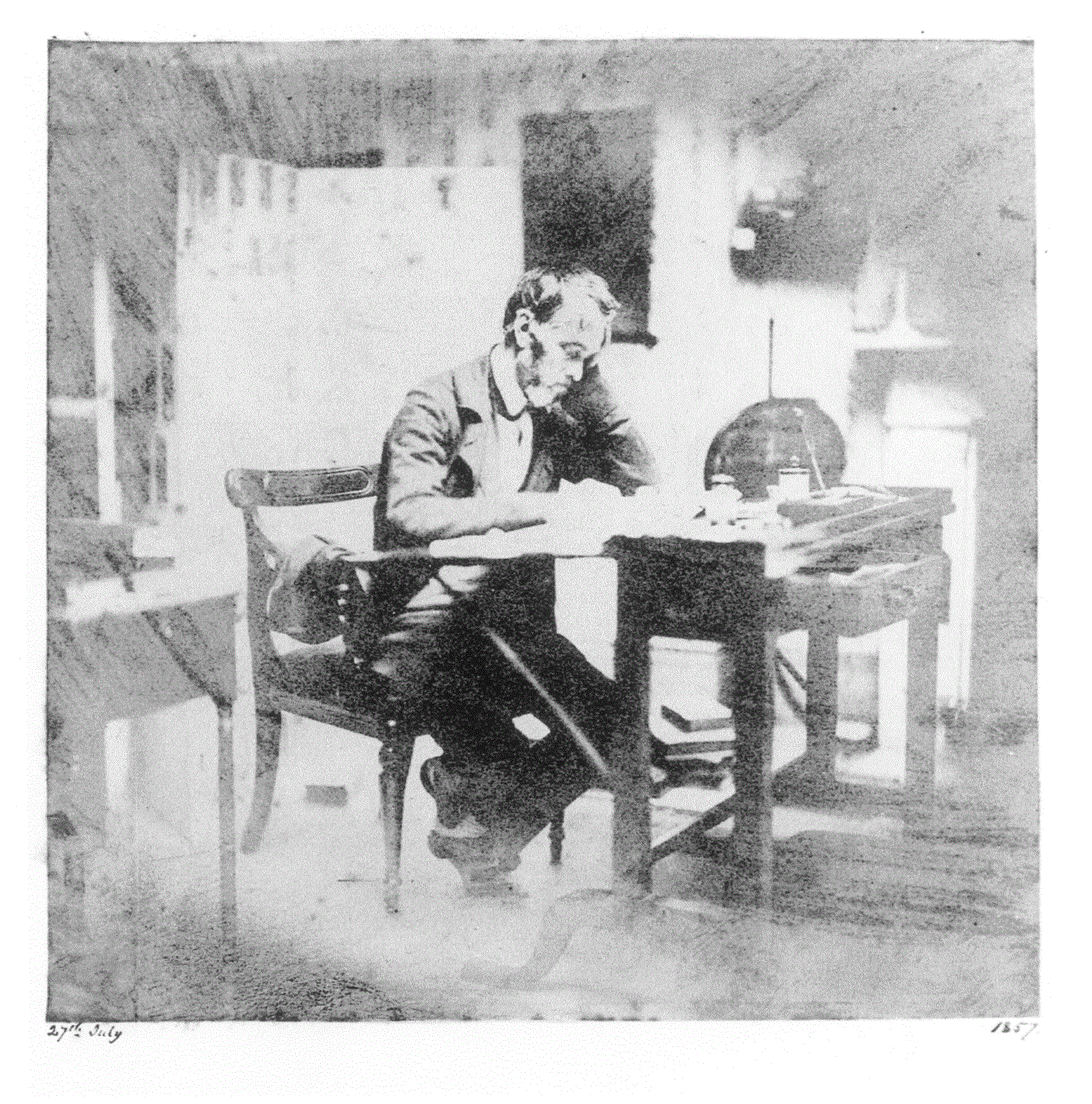
Thomas Carlyle in the attic, 5 Cheyne Row, by Robert Scott Tait, 27 July 1857

His interest did not abate. In Sartor Resartus, which he wrote that year, Diogenes Teufelsdröckh's father is a retired sergeant in Frederick's army. Carlyle asked Karl August Varnhagen von Ense in 1840, "Did anyone ever write an adequate Life of your Frederick the Great?" He began reading a new biography of Frederick by Johann Preuss in 1845, shortly after he had completed the manuscript of Oliver Cromwell's Letters and Speeches. The biography prompted him to declare, "Certainly if there is a Hero for an Epic in these Ages—and why should there not in these ages as well as others,—then this is he!"

He began research for his work in 1851, after the completion of Latter-Day Pamphlets and The Life of John Sterling, touring Germany in the autumn of 1852. Progress was slow at first, as Carlyle harboured doubts about his subject and his ability to complete the task he had set for himself, as well as finding difficulty in accessing source materials. Nonetheless, he persisted, writing copious notes, a large collection of which are now in the Beinecke Library at Yale University. Various assistants helped with his research, making trips to the British Library and State Paper Office among other collections, also copying extracts from German histories. Carlyle purchased many books on German history, a significant number of which he left to Harvard University in his will; they are now housed in the Houghton Library. In 1854, Carlyle had a soundproof room built in the top story of his house on Cheyne Row in order to block the noise from his neighbours and the street. He wrote the remainder of Frederick there.

He completed the first two volumes in 1856 and they were published in 1858. A wearied Carlyle lamented that it "seems worth nothing to me, or less than nothing"; Varnhagen von Ense relates, "Carlyle says that his book on Frederick the Great is the poorest, most troublesome and arduous piece of work he has ever undertaken: no satisfaction in it at all, only labour and sorrow. 'What the devil had I to do with your Friedrich?'" Positive reception of the first two volumes encouraged him, and he made a second trip to Germany, "a visit made primarily to study twelve of the battlefields of Frederick the Great in Silesia, Bohemia, and Saxony," which he documented in Journey to Germany, Autumn 1858.

Originally planning to write four volumes, Carlyle realised that he would need six, as the first two only took the history to 1740 and the death of Frederick's father, Frederick William I. After the 1858 journey he expressed hope that the book would be finished in two years, but it ended up taking seven. The third volume appeared in 1862, the fourth in 1864, and the last two in 1865. Carlyle was seventy years old the year the last volume was published (he turned 70 on 4 December 1865) and had acquired a tremor in his writing hand.

== Reception and legacy ==
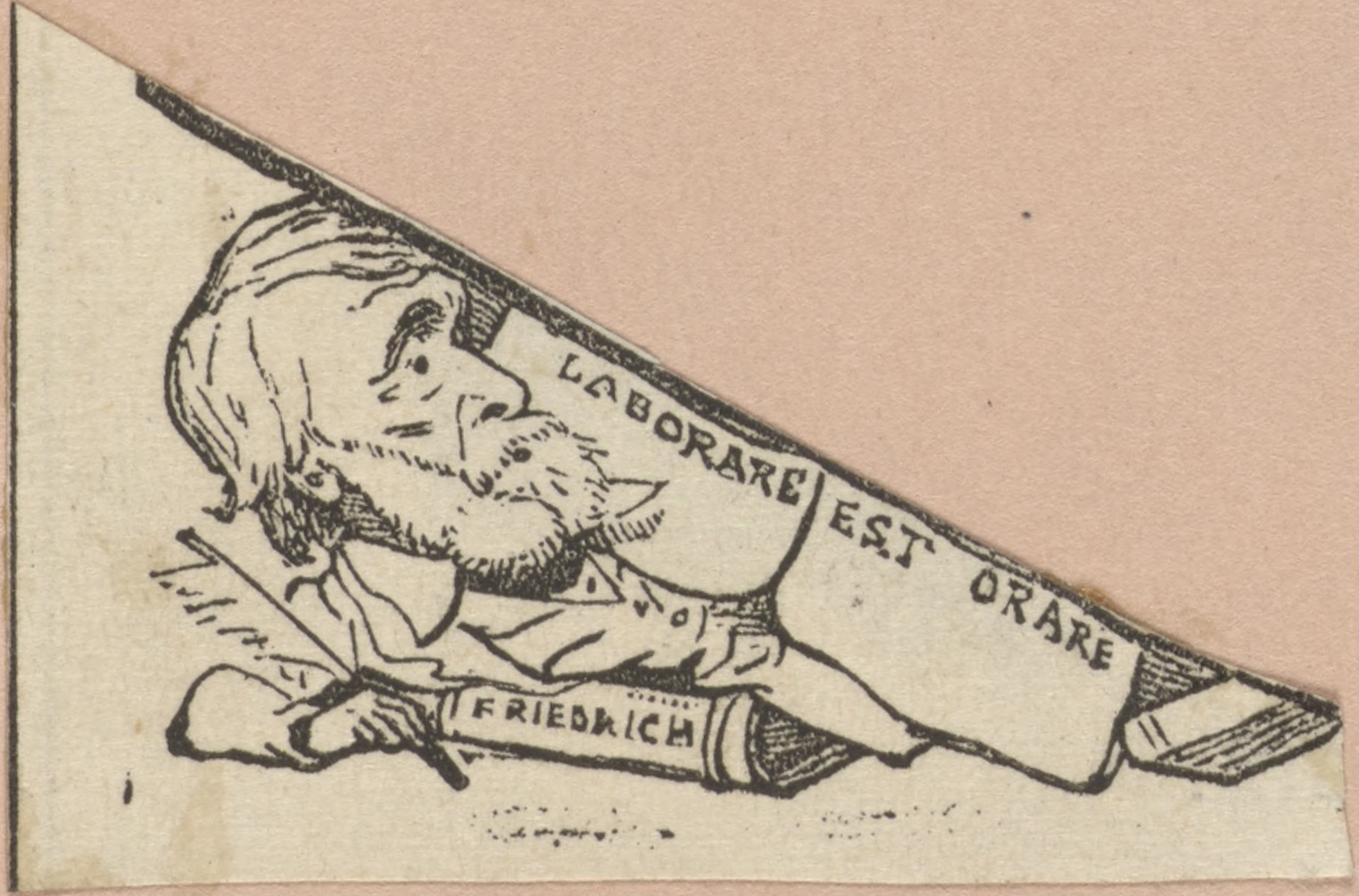
Cartoon of Thomas Carlyle crushed under the weight of Frederick

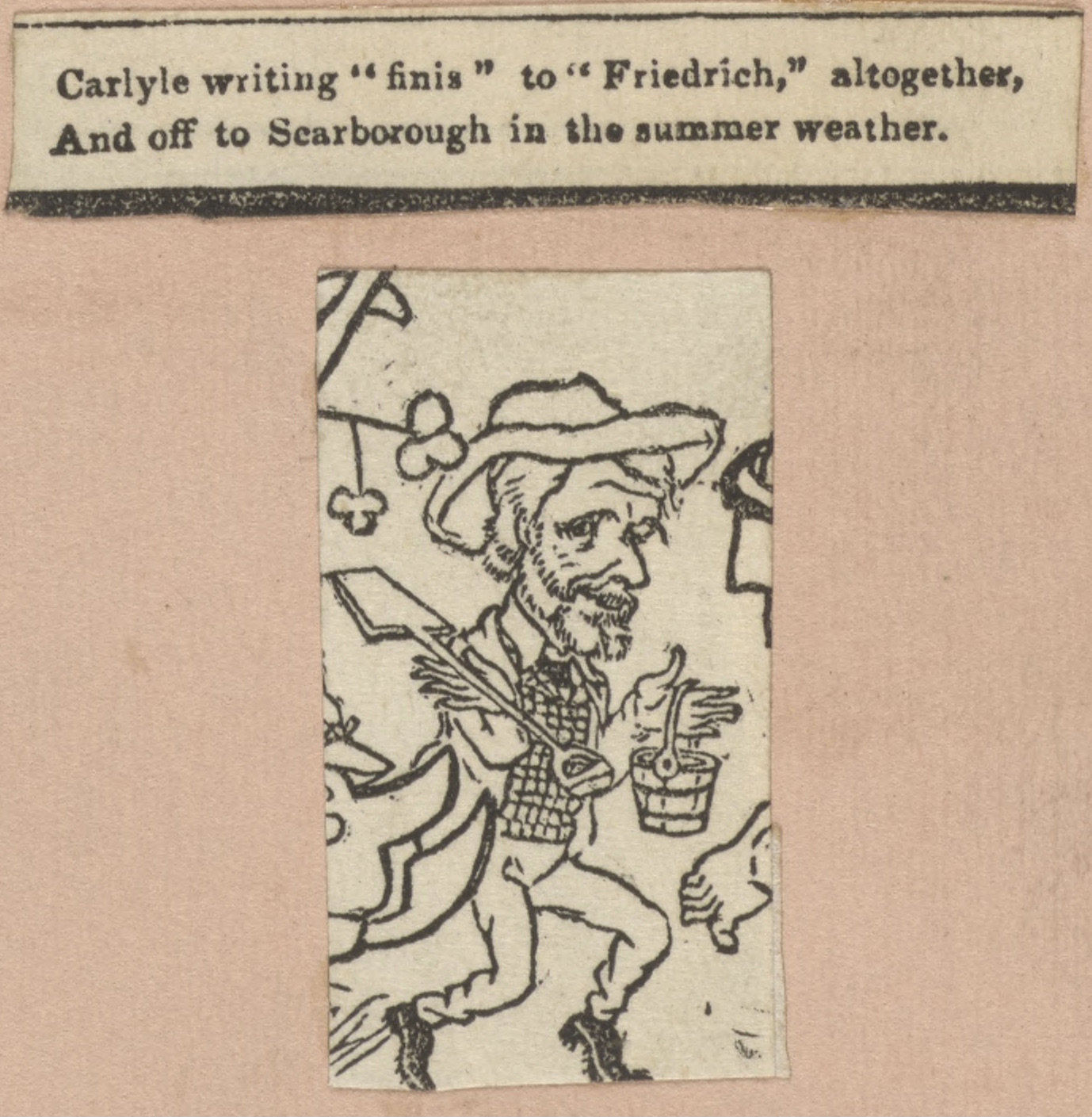
Cartoon of Carlyle, having completed Frederick

James Anthony Froude called it "the grandest of his works". Ralph Waldo Emerson considered it "a book that is a Judgment Day, for its moral verdict on men and nations, and the manners of modern times." He also called it "Infinitely the wittiest book that was ever written." James Russell Lowell wrote that "The figures of most historians seem like dolls stuffed with bran, whose whole substance runs out through any hole that criticism may tear in them; but Carlyle's are so real in comparison, that, if you prick them, they bleed."

William Allingham left his impressions:

Suppose you care little or nothing at all for the King of Prussia and his concerns,—if you care for Literature and for Genius, here is a supreme work of Literary Genius, here is the best that a truly Great Man of the literary sort found himself able to give you by the conscientious devotion of thirteen laborious years; here is spread out legibly before you a world of wit, humour, picture, narrative, character, history, thought, wisdom, shrewdness, learning, insight. Open it where you will, the page is alive.

Theodore Roosevelt included it in his list of recommended books, specifically the battle scenes, which he "not only read through, but have read . . . again and again". Lytton Strachey called it "masterly". H. L. Mencken compared it to the Parthenon, Beethoven's Fifth, and Wiener Blut.

Froude noted that military students of the time learned Frederick's battles from Carlyle's accounts.

=== Germany ===
Frederick the Great was translated into German from 1858 to 1869, almost immediately as it was being published in English. Otto von Bismarck wrote to Carlyle that he had "placed before the Germans our great Prussian King in his full figure, like a living statue." The work appears frequently in Cosima Wagner's diaries; Richard Wagner quoted from it in the 1872 introduction to his essay "Art and Revolution".

==== Hitler's bunker ====
Joseph Goebbels read the book avidly, and is recorded as having read passages from it to Adolf Hitler in the Führerbunker on two occasions in the early months of 1945, as defeat loomed. Goebbels told Lutz Graf Schwerin von Krosigk that after the second reading a few days before the death of Franklin D. Roosevelt on 12 April, "The Führer... had tears in his eyes."

This episode severely damaged the book's reputation in the post-war period, a state of affairs that continues today. Jonathan McCollum wrote in 2007 that "Carlyle's Frederick has never really been extricated from Hitler's bunker."

== Contents ==
The work is made up of 21 books and an appendix.

- Book I: Birth and Parentage (1712)
- Book II: Of Brandenburg and the Hohenzollerns (928 - 1417)
- Book III: The Hohenzollerns in Brandenburg (1412–1718)
- Book IV: Friedrich's Apprenticeship, First Stage (1713–1728)
- Book V: Double-Marriage Project, and What Element It Fell Into (1723–1726)
- Book VI: Double-Marriage Project, and Crown-Prince, Going Adrift Under the Storm-Winds (1727–1730)
- Book VII: Fearful Shipwreck of the Double-Marriage Project (February – November 1730)
- Book VIII: Crown-Prince Retrieved: Life at Custrin (November 1730 – February 1732)
- Book IX: Last Stage of Friedrich's Apprenticeship: Life in Ruppin (1732–1736)
- Book X: At Rheinsberg (1736–1740)
- Book XI: Friedrich Takes the Reins in Hand (June – December 1740)
- Book XII: First Silesian War, Awakening a General European One, Begins (December 1740 – May 1741)
- Book XIII: First Silesian War, Leaving the General European One Ablaze All Round, Gets Ended (May 1741 – July 1742)
- Book XIV: The Surrounding European War Does Not End (August 1742 – July 1744)
- Book XV: Second Silesian War, Important Episode in the General European One (15 August 1744 – 25 December 1745)
- Book XVI: The Ten Years of Peace (1746–1756)
- Book XVII: The Seven-Years War: First Campaign (1756–1757)
- Book XVIII: Seven-Years War Rises to a Height (1757–1759)
- Book XIX: Friedrich Like to Be Overwhelmed in the Seven-Years War (1759–1760)
- Book XX: Friedrich is Not to Be Overwhelmed: The Seven-Years War Gradually Ends (25 April 1760 – 15 February 1763)
- Book XXI: Afternoon and Evening of Friedrich's Life (1763–1786)
- Appendix

== Bibliography ==
- apRoberts, Ruth (2004). "The Historian as Shandean Humorist: Carlyle and Frederick the Great". In Sorensen, David R.; Tarr, Rodger L. (eds.). The Carlyles at Home and Abroad. London: Routledge. pp. 15–26. doi:10.4324/9781351147484-2. ISBN 978-1-351-14748-4.
- Clubbe, John (2011). "On Reading Frederick the Great". Carlyle Studies Annual. 2011 (27): 207–230. JSTOR 26594327.
- Cumming, Mark, ed. (2004). The Carlyle Encyclopedia. Madison and Teaneck, NJ: Fairleigh Dickinson University Press. ISBN 978-0-8386-3792-0.
- Morris, Edmund (2001), Theodore Rex, vol. 2. To 1909
- Sorensen, David R. "Carlyle's Frederick the Great and the 'Sham-Kings' of the American South." Carlyle Studies Annual, no. 30, 2014, pp. 91–114. JSTOR, https://www.jstor.org/stable/26594459. Accessed 21 May 2022.
