= John Prest =

British historian (1928–2018)

John Prest (18 September 1928 – 3 July 2018) was a British historian.

He was born in Tadworth, Surrey, to Dorothy Martin (a watercolourist) and Thomas Prest (a civil servant). He was educated at Bradfield College in Berkshire. He performed his national service in the Royal Air Force before attending King's College, Cambridge in 1949. He gained a First and was made a Fellow of Balliol College, Oxford in 1954, which he held until 1996.

Whilst at Balliol, Prest campaigned for the admittance of women into the College and also for more state-educated pupils to be educated there. After marrying Susan Davis in 1961, Prest moved to Walled Cottage in Wheatley, Oxfordshire. His 1981 book, The Garden of Eden, was the result of his interest in horticulture and it led to him being awarded a trusteeship of the Oxford Botanic Garden and becoming a founding member of the National Botanic Garden of Wales.

His last book, The Lucky Martins, was published in 2015 and was an account of his uncles' service in the First World War. After his death, The Guardian said Prest would be "admired by future historians for his scholarship, humanity and intellectual independence".

== Works ==
- The Industrial Revolution in Coventry (1960).
- Lord John Russell (1972).
- Politics in the Age of Cobden (1977).
- The Garden of Eden: The Botanic Garden and the Re-creation of Paradise (1981).
- Liberty and Locality: Parliament, Permissive Legislation, and Ratepayers' Democracies in the Nineteenth Century (1990).
- The Illustrated History of Oxford University (1993).
- The Lucky Martins (2015).
