= Dryasdust =

Imaginary tedious writer

Dryasdust was an imaginary and tediously thorough literary authority cited by Sir Walter Scott to present background information in his novels; thereafter, a derisory term for anyone who presents historical facts with no feeling for the personalities involved.

“Dryasdust” is mentioned in a whole introductory chapter of Thomas Carlyle’s Oliver Cromwell's Letters and Speeches, this chapter being entitled “Anti-Dryasdust.” It is continually referenced, as Carlyle depicts history being surrendered to Dryasdust:

To Dryasdust, who wishes merely to compile torpedo Histories of the philosophical or other sorts, and gain immortal laurels for himself by writing about it and about it, all this is sport; but to us who struggle piously, passionately, to behold, but in glimpses, the faces of our vanished Fathers, it is death! - Oh, Dryasdust, my voluminous friend, had Human Stupidity continued in the diligent state, think you it might have ever come to this? Surely at least you might have made an Index for these huge books!

== See also ==
- Jedediah Cleishbotham, another meta-character in Scott
