= Past and Present (book) =

1843 book by Thomas Carlyle

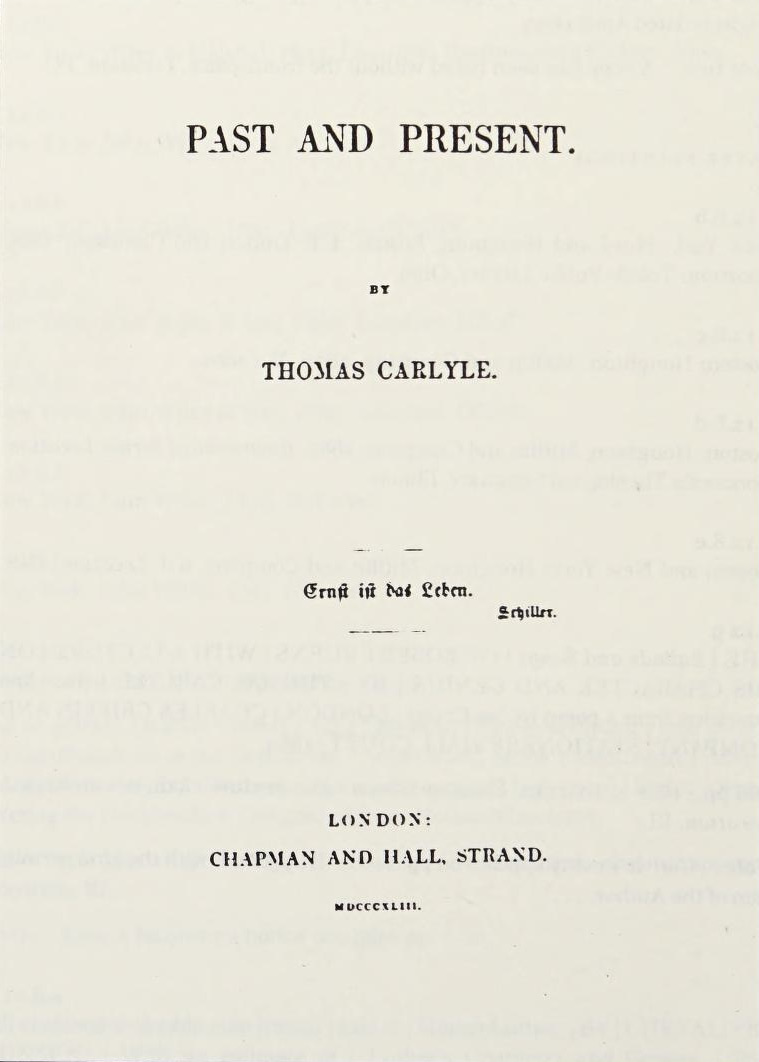
- Title page of the first English edition
- Author: Thomas Carlyle
- Language: English
- Subjects: Medieval history; social criticism
- Genre: Non-fiction
- Published: April 1843
- Publisher: Chapman and Hall
- Publication place: England
- Text: Past and Present at Internet Archive

Past and Present is a book by the Scottish essayist, historian and philosopher Thomas Carlyle. It was published in April 1843 in England and the following month in the United States. It combines medieval history with criticism of 19th-century British society. Carlyle wrote it in seven weeks as a respite from the harassing labour of writing Oliver Cromwell's Letters and Speeches. He was inspired by the recently published Chronicles of the Abbey of Saint Edmund's Bury, which had been written by Jocelin of Brakelond at the close of the 12th century. This account of a medieval monastery had taken Carlyle's fancy, and he drew upon it in order to contrast the monks' reverence for work and heroism with the sham leadership of his own day.

== Composition ==
Carlyle wrote on 27 October 1841 that he had thought of editing a journal, asking James Garth Marshall,

Is it not now that we are to sing and act the great new Epic, not "Arms and the Man," but "Tools and the Man";—to preach and prophesy in all ways that Labor is honorable, that Labor alone is honorable; that Idleness shall and must move out of its way, or be frightfully thrown into the howling dog-kennel?

Having borrowed and read George Calvert Holland's The Millocrat and Marshall's address to the Leeds Parliamentary Reform Association denigrating the "corn-law of aristocracy" while praising industry and industrialists, Carlyle became convinced that "we must have industrial barons, of a quite new suitable sort; workers loyally related to their taskmasters,—related in God (as we may well say); not related in Mammon alone! This will be the real aristocracy, in place of the sham one". The idea of a journal was soon discarded as he turned to writing Oliver Cromwell's Letters and Speeches. Carlyle grew increasingly concerned with the state of England, as he observed widespread hunger and riots in the spring and summer of 1842. In August he wrote to the American philosopher Ralph Waldo Emerson expressing how it distracted him from the writing of Cromwell:

One of my grand difficulties I suspect to be that I cannot write two Books at once; cannot be in the seventeenth century and in the nineteenth at one and the same moment . . . For my heart is sick and sore in behalf of my own poor generation; nay, I feel withal as if the one hope of help for it consisted in the possibility of new Cromwells, and new Puritans: thus do the two centuries stand related to me, the seventeenth worthless except precisely in so far as it can be made the nineteenth; and yet let anybody try that enterprise! Heaven help me.

In the first week of September, Carlyle made a trip to East Anglia for research on Cromwell, in which he observed both the workhouse of St Ives, about which there was "something that reminded me of Dante's Hell", and the ruins of Bury St Edmunds Abbey, "the Heaven's- Watchtower of our Fathers, the fallen God's-Houses, the Golgotha of true Souls departed". In mid-October 1842 while writing Cromwell, Carlyle read J. G. Rokewood's edition of the Chronica Jocelini de Brakelonda de Rebus Gestis Samsonis Abbatis Monasterii Sancti Edmundi published by the Camden Society in 1840. Carlyle was much taken with Abbot Samson's strong leadership of the Monastery of Bury St Edmunds Abbey, and he planned to contrast it with modern England. During the final two months of 1842, he wrote quickly, and the first portion of the manuscript was sent to the printers in February 1843, completing the book on 9 March. The first autograph of Past and Present is in the British Library while the printer's copy is in the Yale University Library.

== Summary ==
=== Book 1: Proem ===
Carlyle expresses his ideas about the Condition of England question in an elevated rhetorical style invoking classical allusions (such as Midas and the Sphinx) and fictional caricatures (such as Bobus and Sir Jabesh Windbag). Carlyle complains that despite England's abundant resources, the poor are starving and unable to find meaningful work, as evinced by the Manchester Insurrection. Carlyle argues that the ruling class needs to guide the nation, and supports an "Aristocracy of Talent". But in line with his concept of "hero-worship", Carlyle argues that first the English must themselves become heroic in order to esteem true heroes rather than quacks.

=== Book 2: The Ancient Monk ===
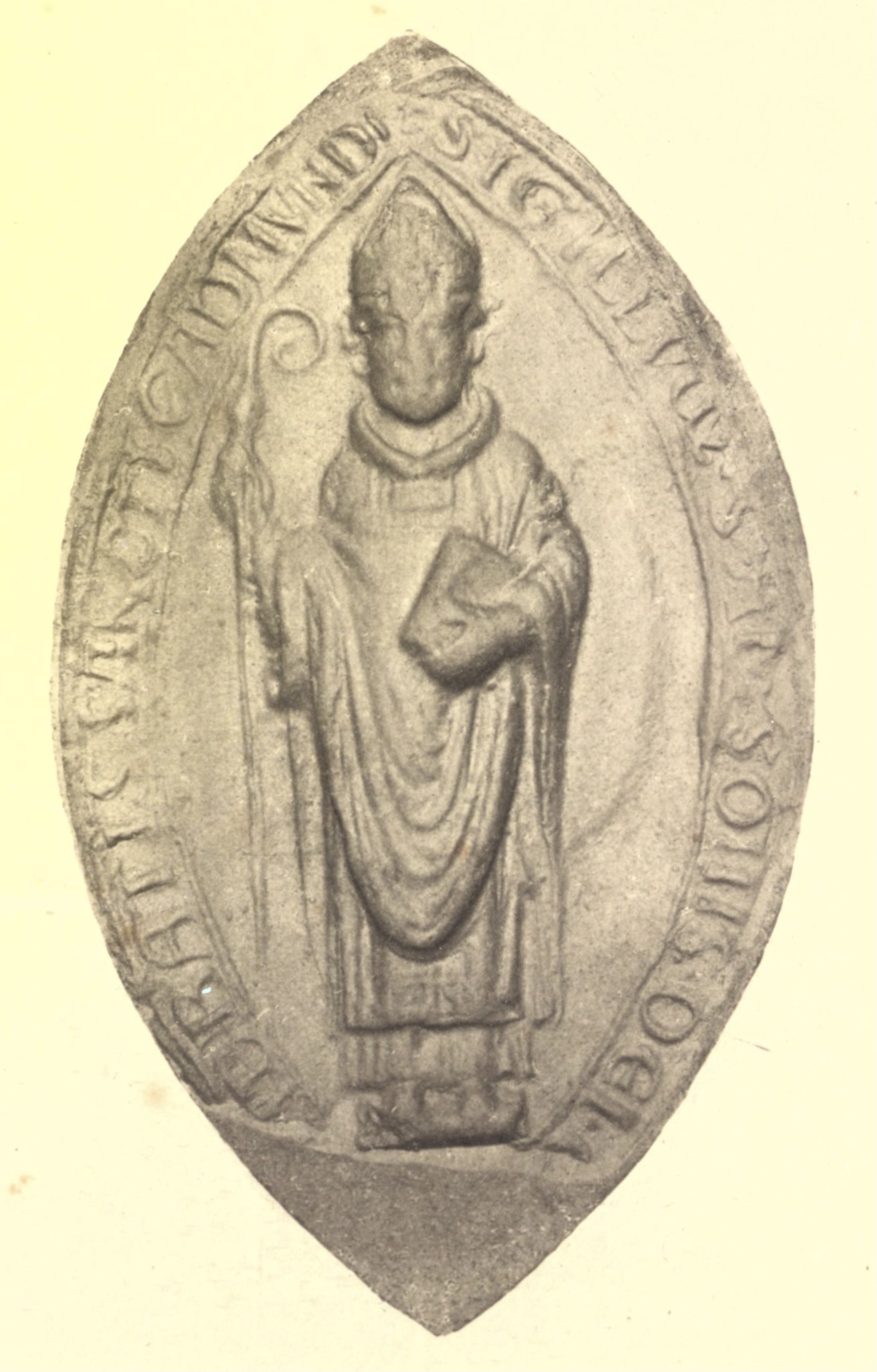
Seal of Abbot Samson

Carlyle presents the history of Samson of Tottington, a 12th-century monk who became Abbot of Bury St Edmunds, as chronicled by Jocelin of Brakelond. Carlyle describes Samson as a lowly monk with no formal training or leadership experience who, on his election to the abbacy, worked earnestly and diligently to overcome the economic and spiritual maladies that had befallen the abbey under the rule of Hugo, the former abbot. Carlyle concludes from this history that despite the monks' primitive knowledge and superstitions (he refers to them repeatedly as "blockheads"), they were able to recognise and promote genuine leadership, in contrast to contemporary Englishmen:

Here he is discovered with a maximum of two shillings in his pocket, and a leather scrip round his neck; trudging along the highway, his frock-skirts looped over his arm. They think this is he nevertheless, the true Governor; and he proves to be so. Brethren, have we no need of discovering true Governors, but will sham ones forever do for us? (II.ix)

Carlyle presents his history as the narrative of the lives of men and their deeds, rather than as a dry chronicle of external details. To this end, he repeatedly contrasts his history with the style of the fictional historian Dryasdust.

=== Book 3: The Modern Worker ===
Carlyle transitions from discussing a medieval society, imbued with meaning, to the plight of the modern worker who lacks absolute meaning in his own existence. He directs his vitriol across multiple fronts, from the injustices of the Corn Laws to the utilitarian reductionism of laissez-faire thinkers. The British aristocracy is attacked for not performing their traditional obligations in guiding society, and the bourgeois elements of society are attacked for reducing life to a money-driven farce of empty talk. He in fact attacks industrial society more generally, which he sees exuding 'Midas-eared Mammonism'.

=== Book 4: Horoscope ===
Carlyle ends the book in proposing what must be done to remedy the faults he sees in society, which he boils down to the problem of governing men and relates closely to the matter of organising labour. He notes that some combination of aristocracy and priesthood must be restored in society to give it guidance, with the force of a radical rejuvenation of spirit to elevate the working man from his wretched existence and away from the 'anarchy of supply and demand'. This new society would see wise leaders elevate the mob into a firm regimented mass.

== Reception and influence ==
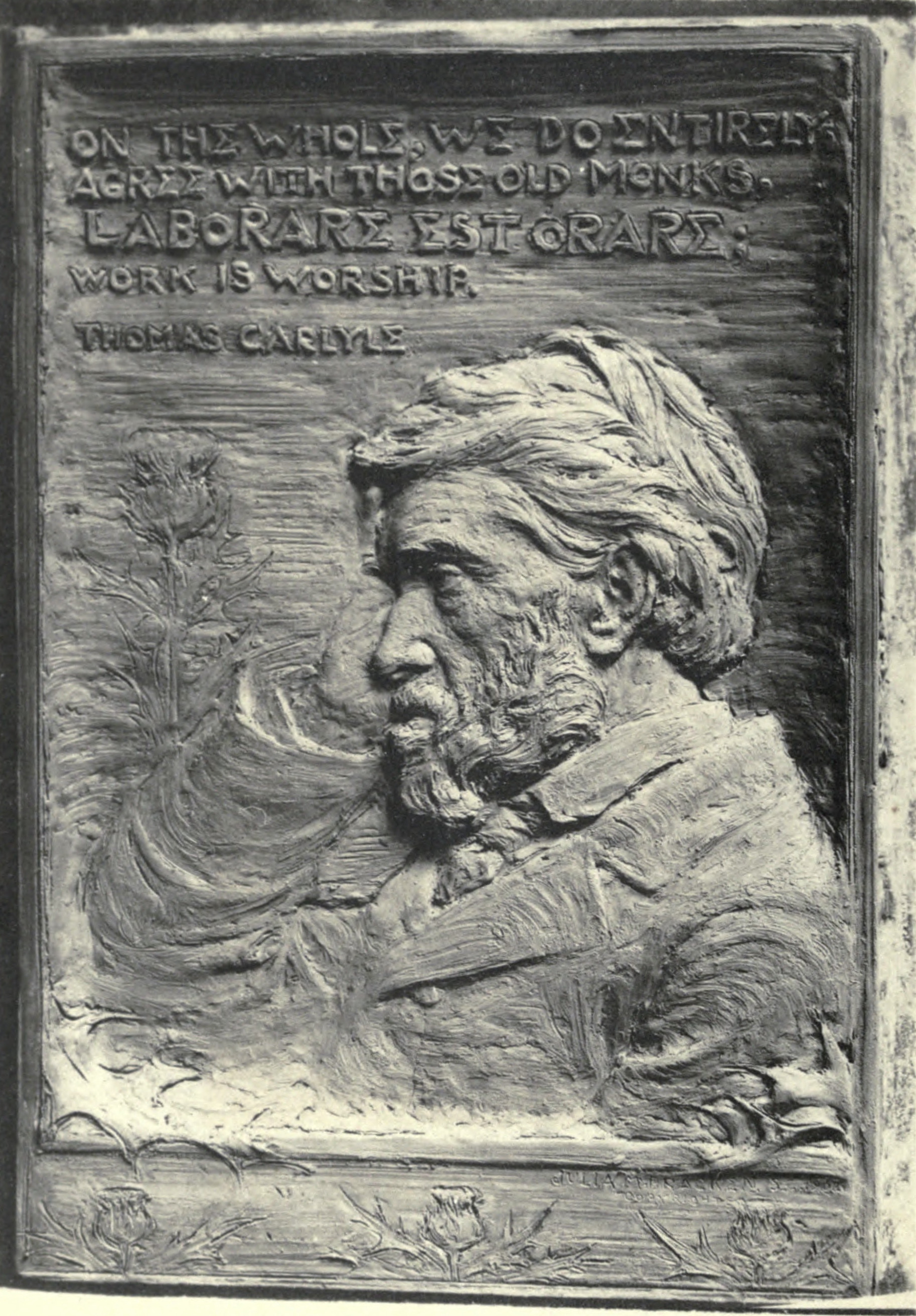
Sculpture of Thomas Carlyle with a quotation from book III of Past and Present by the Industrial Art League, 1902

Lord Acton called it "the most remarkable piece of historical thinking in the language." G. K. Chesterton considered it along with Chartism (1839) to be "the work [Carlyle] was chosen by gods and men to achieve".

Past and Present contributed to several social developments in the 19th and early-20th centuries, including the decline of laissez-faire, the crafting and passage of the Factory Acts, the Elementary Education Act 1870 and the Industrial Conciliation and Arbitration Act, the emigration of labourers from England to the United States during the Great Rapprochement, the rise of practices such as business ethics, profit sharing, and the redistribution of income and wealth, the establishment of state education, and even playgrounds.

Carlyle's influence on modern socialism can be seen most acutely in the response to Past and Present. New Moral World, the official newspaper of the Owenite movement, published a six-part review by its then-editor George Fleming between August and November 1843, further issuing an additional excerpt two months afterwards. Fleming expressed "gratification in finding . . . the true philosophy of Socialism . . . arrayed in the gorgeous and striking drapery of Carlyleism." Fleming believed that a "new, unexpected, and powerful ally to our cause has come into the field", finding in the work "identical principles with those of [Robert Owen]", portraying Carlyle as a covert socialist that has infiltrated the "charmed circle" of high society. In January 1844, Friedrich Engels published an extensive, laudatory review in the Deutsch–Französische Jahrbücher. He wrote that Carlyle's acute analysis of the social question in England made it the only book by a contemporary educated Englishman worth reading. Engels praised Carlyle's humanitarian point of view yet considered it only a nonscientific preliminary to socialism. He characterised Carlyle as a German pantheist and a romantic Tory, a follower of Friedrich Wilhelm Joseph Schelling rather than of Georg Wilhelm Friedrich Hegel, too hung up on religion and the myth of aristocratic leadership to accept freedom and self-determination as the ultimate aim of history, while expressing hope that Carlyle would overcome these limitations.

The book greatly influenced the development of medievalism and the Pre-Raphaelite Brotherhood. John William Mackail wrote that during William Morris and Edward Burne-Jones' days at Oxford, "Carlyle's Past and Present stood alongside of Modern Painters as inspired and absolute truth." John Ruskin gifted his personal, extensively annotated copy to a friend in 1887, along with a letter in which he called it "a book which I read no more because it has become a part of myself, and my old marks in it are now useless, because in my heart I mark it all." Fors Clavigera has been called "in effect the resumption of the concerns of Carlyle's Past and Present in another form."
