= Georg Bernhard Tennyson =

American scholar

Georg Bernhard Tennyson (July 13, 1930 – May 19, 2007) was an American scholar. He was emeritus professor of English at UCLA, a longtime editor of the journal Nineteenth-Century Literature, and a prominent scholar of Thomas Carlyle and Owen Barfield.

== Biography ==
Georg Bernhard Tennyson was born on July 13, 1930, in Washington, D.C. His mother Emily Inez Zimmerli worked in the United States Senate, while his father, for whom he was named, owned the Tennyson Tire Company.

Tennyson earned Bachelor of Arts and Master of Arts degrees from George Washington University. In 1954, he joined the United States Army, was trained in cryptography, and deployed to a base near Freiburg im Breisgau, Germany. He served in the National Security Agency as a German translator and code breaker. Upon discharge, he earned MA and PhD degrees from Princeton University and declined an offer to join the Princeton faculty. Instead, he joined the University of North Carolina for two years before joining UCLA in 1964, where he remained until 1994. Tennyson met Owen Barfield in 1968 and was a friend and correspondent until Barfield's death in 1997, whereupon he served as co-executor of Barfield's literary estate.

Tennyson died on May 19, 2007, at Grossman Burn Center in Sherman Oaks, Los Angeles, California, following a fire at his home. He was preceded by his wife and survived by two children, four grandchildren, and his sister.

== Career ==
Tennyson held a certificate in Shakespeare Studies from the Shakespeare Institute and a certificate in German studies from the University of Freiburg. He was a Fellow of the British Council, the Fulbright Program, the John Simon Guggenheim Foundation, and a Summer Seminar Director for the National Endowment for the Humanities. He was a member of various scholarly organizations, including The Carlyle Society of Edinburgh, the C. S. Lewis Society of California, and the Modern Language Association.

His monograph "Sartor" Called "Resartus" (1965) has been called "the best book ever written on Thomas Carlyle". His essay "Owen Barfield and the Rebirth of Meaning" (1969) made him "a principal founder" of Barfield scholarship.

== Works ==
- Tennyson, G. B. (1965). Sartor Called Resartus: The Genesis, Structure, and Style of Thomas Carlyle's First Major Work. Princeton, New Jersey: Princeton University Press. LCCN 65017162.
- Tennyson, G. B. (1973). "The Carlyles". In DeLaura, David J. (ed.). Victorian Prose: A Guide to Research. New York: The Modern Language Association of America. pp. 31–112. ISBN 9780873522502.
- Tennyson, G. B. (1976). "Carlyle Today". In Fielding, K. J.; Tarr, Rodger L. (eds.). Carlyle Past and Present: A Collection of New Essays. Vision Press. pp. 27–50. ISBN 9780854783731.
- Tennyson, G. B. (1976). "Etymology and Meaning". In Sugerman, Shirley (ed.). Evolution of Consciousness: Studies in Polarity.
- Tennyson, G. B. (1976). "A Bibliography of the Works of Owen Barfield". In Sugerman, Shirley (ed.). Evolution of Consciousness: Studies in Polarity.
- Tennyson, G. B. (1976). "Parody as Style: Carlyle and His Parodists". In Clubbe, John (ed.). Carlyle and His Contemporaries: Essays in Honor of Charles Richard Sanders. Durham, North Carolina: Duke University Press. pp. 298–316. ISBN 9780822303404.
- Tennyson, G. B. (1981). Victorian Devotional Poetry: The Tractarian Mode. Cambridge, Mass.: Harvard University Press. ISBN 9780674935860.
- Tennyson, G. B., ed. (1984). A Carlyle Reader. Cambridge: Cambridge University Press.
- Tennyson, G. B., ed. (1989). Owen Barfield on C. S. Lewis. Middletown, CT: Wesleyan University Press.
- Tennyson, G. B., ed. (1999). A Barfield Reader: Selections from the Writings of Owen Barfield. Wesleyan University Press.
