= Ruth apRoberts =

Canadian scholar of Victorian religious literature

Ruth apRoberts (1919 – March 26, 2006) was a Canadian scholar of Victorian and religious literature. Her work focused on 19th-century British literature as it intersected with philosophical issues and spiritual traditions.

== Biography ==
Born as Ruth Heyer in 1919 in Vancouver, British Columbia, she received her bachelor's degree from the University of British Columbia and her master's degree from UC Berkeley. After raising her four children, she received her PhD in English from UCLA. She was the widow of Robert apRoberts, a scholar of Welsh descent who taught medieval literature at California State University, Northridge.

At the University of California, Riverside, apRoberts held the positions of Graduate Advisor and Chair of the English Department. She taught courses in Victorian literature, the Aesthetic Movement, and the Bible as literature. She held a Guggenheim Fellowship (1978–1979).

She was awarded the UCR Distinguished Teaching Award in 1977, and the Distinguished Emeritus Award in 1995.

She was the author of four books: The Moral Trollope (1971), which explored the aesthetic and ethical dimensions of the novels of Anthony Trollope; Arnold and God (1983) which probed the anti-literal understandings of religion that permeate all of Matthew Arnold's poetry and social criticism; The Ancient Dialect (1988) which analyzed the writing of Thomas Carlyle in relation to the study of comparative religions; and The Biblical Web (1994) which provided a purely literary analysis of the Christian Bible and the Hebrew Torah, focusing on the resonances and influence of their language.

At the time of her death, Katherine Kinney, chair of the Department of English at UC Riverside had this to say: "Ruth apRoberts helped shape the intellectual culture of our department. As a scholar of the highest reputation and accomplishment, she led by example. She was a generous colleague and committed teacher whose passion for literature and intellectual inquiry exemplified our shared mission."

== Publications ==
- The Moral Trollope (Ohio University Press, 1971)
- Arnold and God (University of California Press, 1983; selected by Choice as an Outstanding Book of 1983)
- The Ancient Dialect (University of California Press, 1988)
- The Biblical Web (University of Michigan Press, 1994)
