= Henry Duff Traill =

British author and journalist (1842–1900)

- Born: 14 August 1842; Blackheath, London, England
- Died: 21 February 1900 (aged 57); London, England
- Education: St John's College, Oxford
- Occupations: Journalist; editor; author

Henry Duff Traill (14 August 1842 – 21 February 1900) was a British writer and journalist.

== Life ==
Born at Blackheath, he belonged to an old Caithness family, the Traills of Rattar, and his father, James Traill, was the stipendiary magistrate of Greenwich and Woolwich Police Court. He was sent to the Merchant Taylors' School, where he rose to be head of the school and obtained a scholarship at St John's College, Oxford. Initially destined for the profession of medicine, Traill took his degree in natural sciences in 1865 but then he read for the bar and was called in 1869. In 1871 he received an appointment as an Inspector of Returns for the Board of Education, a position which left him leisure to cultivate his gift for literature.

In 1873 he became a contributor to the Pall Mall Gazette, then under the editorship of Frederick Greenwood. He followed Greenwood to the St. James's Gazette when in 1880 the Pall Mall Gazette took for a time the Liberal side, and he continued to contribute to that paper up to 1895. In the meantime he had also joined the staff of the Saturday Review, to which he sent, among other writings, weekly verses upon subjects of the hour. Some of the best of these he republished in 1882 in a volume called Recaptured Rhymes, and others in a later collection of Saturday Songs (1890).

He was also a leader-writer for the Daily Telegraph and edited The Observer from 1889 until 1891, which experienced an increase in circulation during his time there. In 1897, he became first editor of Literature, when that weekly paper (afterwards sold and incorporated with the Academy) was established by the proprietors of The Times, and directed its fortunes until his death.

Traill's long connection with journalism must not obscure the fact that he was a man of letters rather than a journalist. He wrote best when he wrote with least sense of the burden of responsibility. His playful humour and his ready wit were given full scope only when he was writing to please himself. One of his most brilliant jeux d'esprit was a pamphlet which was published without his name soon after he had begun to write for the newspapers. It was called The Israelitish Question and the Comments of the Canaan Journals thereon (1876). This told the story of the Exodus in articles which parodied very cleverly the style of all the leading journals of the day, and was at once recognized as the work of a born humorist. Traill sustained this reputation with The New Lucian, which appeared in 1884 (2nd ed., with several new dialogues, 1900); but for the rest his labours were upon more serious lines. He directed the production of a vast work on Social England in 1893-1898; he wrote, for several series of biographies, studies of Coleridge (1884), Sterne (1882), William III (1888), Shaftesbury (1886), Strafford (1889), and Lord Salisbury (1891); he compiled a biography of Sir John Franklin the Arctic explorer (1896); after a visit to Egypt he published a volume on the country; and in 1897 appeared his book on Lord Cromer, the man who had done so much to bring it back to prosperity. Of these the literary studies are the best, for Traill possessed great critical insight. He published two collections of essays: Number Twenty (1892), and The New Fiction (1897). In 1865 his Glaucus, a tale of a Fish, was produced at the Olympic Theatre with Miss Nellie Farren in the part of Glaucus. In conjunction with Mr Robert Hichens he wrote The Medicine Man, produced at the Lyceum in 1898. He died in London on 21 February 1900.

He also edited the Centenary edition of the Works of Thomas Carlyle (30 volumes, Chapman and Hall, 1896-1907), writing introductions to the various works.

== Works ==
- Sterne (1882)
- Recaptured Rhymes (1882)
- The New Lucian (1884)
- Coleridge (1884)
- Shaftesbury (1886)
- William III (1888)
- Strafford (1889)
- Saturday Songs (1890)
- The Marquis of Salisbury (1890)
- Number Twenty: Fables and Fantasies (1892)
- The Life of Sir John Franklin, R.N. (1896)
- The new fiction, and other essays on literary subjects (1897)

== Notes ==
Media offices
Preceded by Edward Dicey	Editor of The Observer; 1889 - 1891	Succeeded by Rachel Beer
