= Latter-Day Pamphlets =

1850 book by Thomas Carlyle

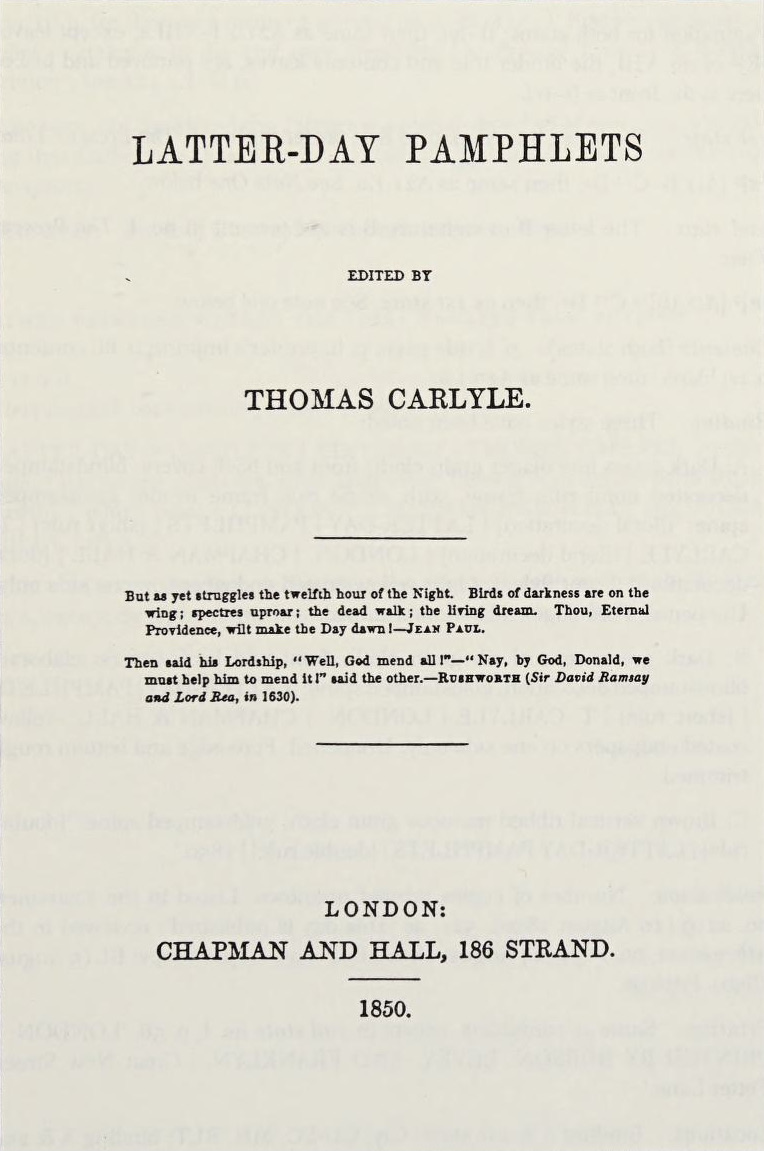
- Title page of the first English book edition
- Author: Thomas Carlyle
- Language: English
- Published: 1850
- Publisher: Chapman and Hall
- Publication place: England

Latter-Day Pamphlets is a series of "pamphlets" published by the Scottish essayist, historian and philosopher Thomas Carlyle in 1850, in vehement denunciation of what he believed to be the political, social and religious imbecilities and injustices of the period.

== Composition ==
Carlyle was deeply affected by the Revolutions of 1848 and his journeys to Ireland in 1846 and 1849 during the Great Famine. After struggling to formulate his response to these events, he wrote to his sister in January 1850 that he had "decided at last to give vent to myself in a Series of Pamphlets; 'Latter-Day Pamphlets' is the name I have given them, as significant of the ruinous overwhelmed and almost dying condition in which the world paints itself to me." The title is derived from the Book of Job: "For I know that my redeemer liveth, and that he shall stand at the latter day upon the earth".

Carlyle conceived of the work as a sort of prose epic; although his original plan to produce twelve pamphlets – the number of books associated with such epics as the Aeneid and Paradise Lost – may have been coincidental, Carlyle's rhetoric echoes the epic form.

== Overview ==
Latter-Day Pamphlets is, at its core, a rebuke of democracy, "the grand, alarming, imminent, and indisputable Reality" of the time, rooted in Carlyle's two basic principles of immutable order and eternal laws. Carlyle announced the theme of his modern epic using the traditional epic question:

What is Democracy; this huge inevitable Product of the Destinies, which is everywhere the portion of our Europe in these latter days? There lies the question for us. Whence comes it, this universal big black Democracy; whither tends it; what is the meaning of it? A meaning it must have, or it would not be here. If we can find the right meaning of it, we may, wisely submitting or wisely resisting and controlling, still hope to live in the midst of it; if we cannot find the right meaning, if we find only the wrong or no meaning in it, to live will not be possible!

Carlyle called the Pamphlets "Carlylese 'Tracts for the Times,'" referring to the writings of John Henry Newman and the Oxford Movement. The comparison is apt, as Carlyle's polemical style and his search for an authoritative centre of life share many similarities with the movement.

The best known of the pamphlets in the collection is Hudson's Statue, an attack on plans to erect a monument to the bankrupted financier George Hudson, known as the "railway king". The pamphlet expresses a central theme of the book — the corrosive effects of populist politics and of a culture driven by greed. Carlyle also attacked the prison system, which he believed to be too liberal, and democratic parliamentary government.

The imaginary figure of "Bobus", a corrupt sausage-maker turned politician first introduced in Past and Present, is used to epitomise the ways in which modern commercial culture saps the morality of society.

== Contents ==
The pamphlets are:

- No. 1. The Present Time (1 February 1850)
- No. 2. Model Prisons (1 March 1850)
- No. 3. Downing Street (1 April 1850)
- No. 4. The New Downing Street (15 April 1850)
- No. 5. Stump-Orator (1 May 1850)
- No. 6. Parliaments (1 June 1850)
- No. 7. Hudson's Statue (1 July 1850)
- No. 8. Jesuitism (1 August 1850)

== Reception and influence ==
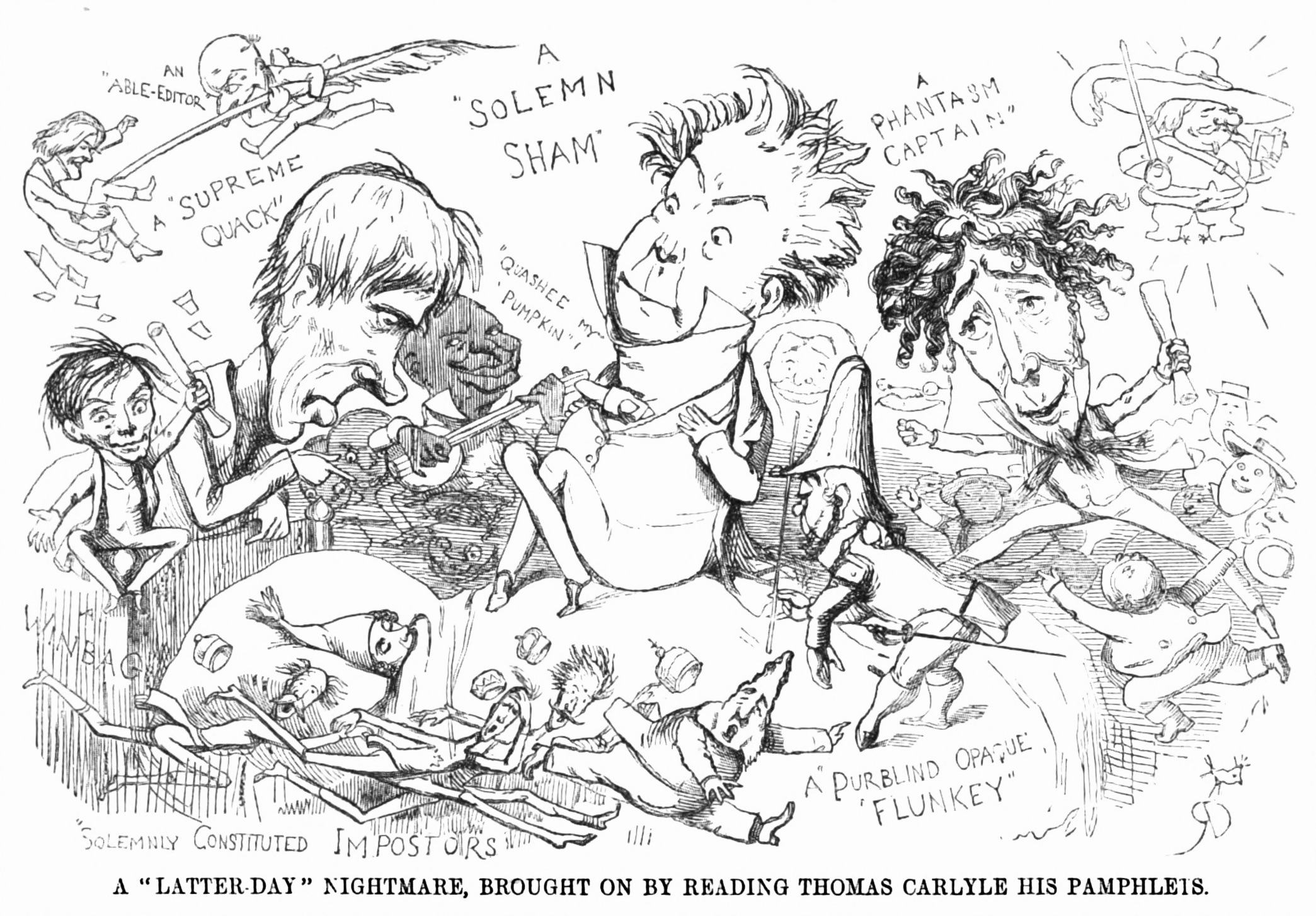
Cartoon by Richard Doyle in Punch, 18, 1850. Top (L-R): John Russell, Carlyle, Robert Peel, Benjamin Disraeli. Bottom (L-R): Godefroi Cavaignac, Alphonse de Lamartine, Louis Philippe I, Napoleon III.

The writer Hale White remarked that upon publication of the Pamphlets, "almost all the reviews united in a howl of execration". David Masson said that never before "was there a publication so provocative of rage, hatred and personal malevolence." Carlyle's biographer David Alec Wilson wrote that since the "letters of Junius, nothing so sensational in politics had been printed in England".

The philosopher Friedrich Engels reviewed the first two pamphlets in April 1850. He approved of Carlyle's criticisms against hereditary aristocracy while harshly criticising Carlyle's views as "a thinly disguised acceptance of existing class rule" and an unjust exoneration of statism. Karl Marx attacked Carlyle's "model prisons" and "aristocracy of talent" in two articles for the New York Daily Tribune, appearing in September and October 1853 respectively. Anthony Trollope for his part considered that in the Pamphlets "the grain of sense is so smothered in a sack of the sheerest trash. . . . He has one idea – a hatred of spoken and acted falsehood; and on this, he harps through the whole eight pamphlets".

The philosopher Ralph Waldo Emerson expressed his appreciation of the work in an August 1850 letter to Carlyle. "The vivid daguerrotype of the times, the next ages will thank you for; but the circling baulking Present refuses to be helped." Charles Dickens agreed with Carlyle's feeling, as expressed in Model Prisons, that criminals were being treated better than paupers. Dickens echoed Carlyle in an article entitled 'Pet Prisoners' which appeared in Household Words, a magazine edited by Dickens. John Ruskin wrote in 1862, upon re-reading the Pamphlets, especially Jesuitism, that "I can't think what Mr. Carlyle wants me to write anything more for—if people don't attend to that, what more is to be said?" Carlyle's arguments against the attempt to "reform society through the exclusive mechanism of the ballot-box" impacted Ruskin, John Stuart Mill, and Charles Kingsley, who equally denounced the folly of the "mere brute 'arithmocracy.'" Professor H. J. C. Grierson regarded the Pamphlets as "central work" in Carlyle's œuvre.

=== References in other works ===
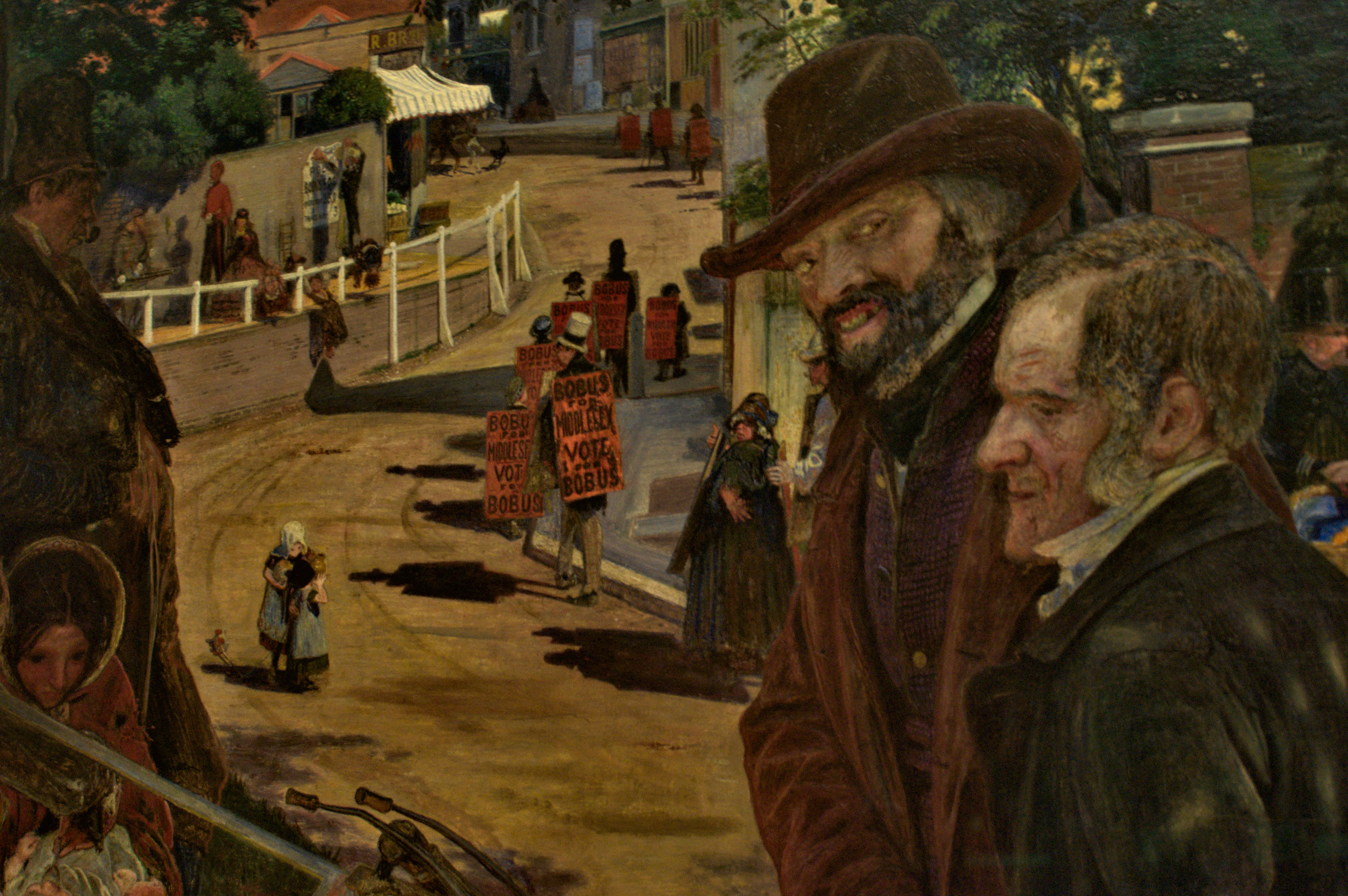
Carlyle (second from right) depicted with Frederick Maurice in Ford Madox Brown's painting Work (1865). A woman with a Bobus sandwich board appears to the left of his head.

In The Present Time, Carlyle criticised American democracy:

"What have they done?" . . . "They have doubled their population every twenty years. They have begotten, with a rapidity beyond recorded example, Eighteen Millions of the greatest bores ever seen in this world before:—that, hitherto, is their feat in History!"—And so we leave them, for the present; and cannot predict the success of Democracy, on this side of the Atlantic, from their example.

This line provoked a reply from the abolitionist Elizur Wright in the form of his own pamphlet, Perforations in the "Latter-Day Pamphlets" by One of the "Eighteen Millions of Bores"; it attacked Carlyle as ignorant and reactionary, concluding: ". . . we will take in good part the broad hint to make our calls shorter and less frequent at Cheyne Row." Samuel Gray Ward later avoided a visit accordingly. Carlyle wrote to Emerson in November 1850, "tho' Elizur sent me his Pamphlet, it is a fact that I have not read a word of it, nor shall ever read."

In his painting Work, inspired by the book, Ford Madox Brown depicted Carlyle watching honest workers improving the social infrastructure by laying modern drains in a suburb of London, while agents of the dishonest Bobus disfigure the area by marketing his political campaign with posters and sandwich boards.

George Fitzhugh derived the title of Cannibals All! or, Slaves without Masters (1857) from The Present Time, also quoting from it extensively.

Richard Wagner wrote in "Letter to H. v. Stein" (1883), "Carlyle has plainly proved to us the natural relation of all Colonies to their mother-land", referring to The New Downing Street.

Herbert Agar quoted from The Present Time in the introduction to The Land of the Free (1935). He used an image of Carlyle's to characterise big industry, big cities and big government as "Enormous Megatherions".

== Bibliography ==
- Cumming, Mark, ed. (2004). The Carlyle Encyclopedia. Madison and Teaneck, NJ: Fairleigh Dickinson University Press. ISBN 978-0-8386-3792-0.
- Goldberg, Michael (1976). "A Universal 'howl of execration': Carlyle's Latter-Day Pamphlets and Their Critical Reception". In Clubbe, John (ed.). Carlyle and His Contemporaries: Essays in Honor of Charles Richard Sanders. Durham, North Carolina: Duke University Press. pp. 129–147. ISBN 9780822303404.
- Goldberg, M. K.; Seigel, J. P., eds. (1983). Carlyle's Latter-Day Pamphlets. Canadian Federation for the Humanities.
- Seigel, Jules P. (1976). "Latter-Day Pamphlets: The Near Failure of Form and Vision". In Fielding, K. J.; Tarr, Rodger L. (eds.). Carlyle Past and Present: A Collection of New Essays. Vision Press. pp. 155–176. ISBN 9780854783731.
