= The Life of John Sterling =

Book by Thomas Carlyle

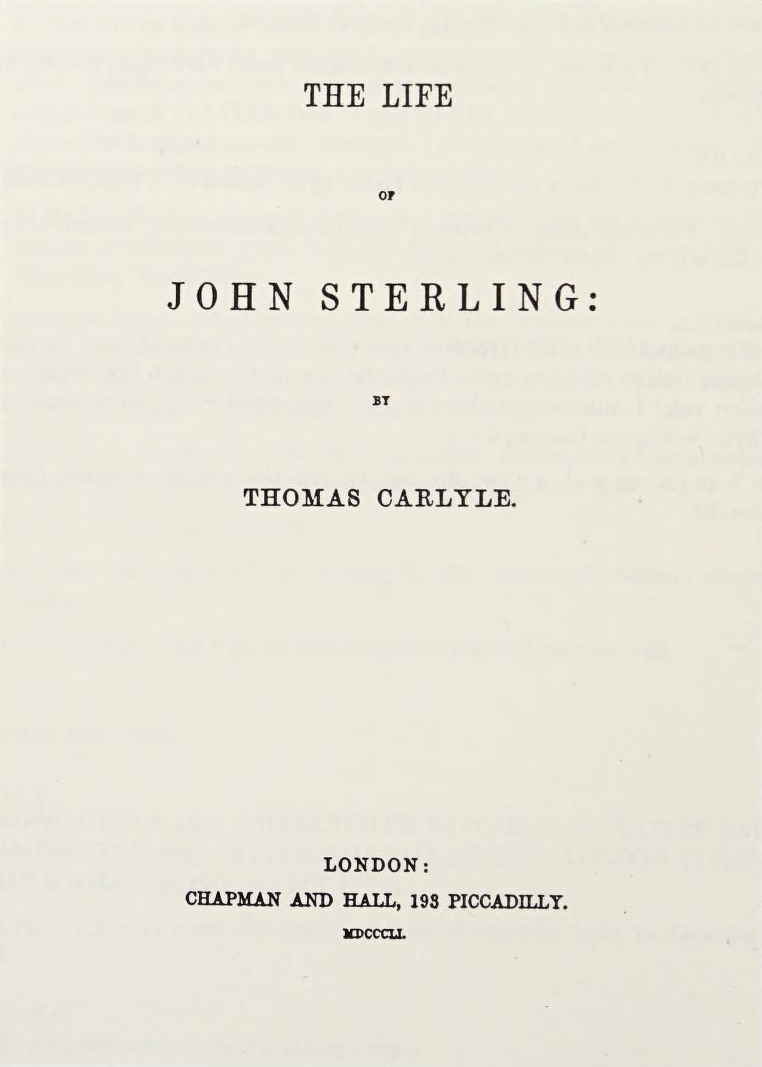
- Title page of the first English edition
- Author: Thomas Carlyle
- Language: English
- Subject: John Sterling
- Genre: Biography
- Published: 1851
- Publisher: Chapman and Hall
- Publication place: England

The Life of John Sterling is a biography of the Scottish author John Sterling (1806–1844) written by his friend, the Scottish essayist, historian and philosopher Thomas Carlyle. It was first published in 1851.

John Sterling was a colleague and friend of Carlyle, but achieved far less success as a writer. They met when Carlyle was forty, and Sterling thirty. Their friendship, which lasted for the remaining years of Sterling's short life, was carried on for the most part through letters. When Sterling died in 1844, Carlyle and Archdeacon Hare were appointed as joint literary executors of Sterling's work—two volumes of poetry. Hare produced an obituary of Sterling but, some years later, Carlyle wrote his biography, in part at least, to counter what he considered a poor biographical memoir by Hare.

Today, The Life of John Sterling is most often read as a work of Carlyle, rather than from an interest in the life of Sterling, and this was probably the case, even when the work was published in 1851. However, the biography portrays Sterling as someone who evidently regarded himself as equal to Carlyle, and perhaps this is one of the things that Carlyle liked about him. He was a great sounding board for Carlyle's work, and a most entertaining and revealing passage is one in which Carlyle quotes Sterling's analysis of his brilliant Sartor Resartus, in which he mocks Carlyle for making up words:

"...and first as to the language. A good deal of this is positively barbarous. 'Environment', 'vestural', 'stertorous', 'visualized', 'complected', and others to be found I think in the first twenty pages,—are words, so far as I know, without any authority..."

== Reception ==
Leslie Stephen wrote that "the subject roused Carlyle's tenderest mood, and the Life is one of the most perfect in the language".
