= Oliver Cromwell's Letters and Speeches =

1845 book by Thomas Carlyle

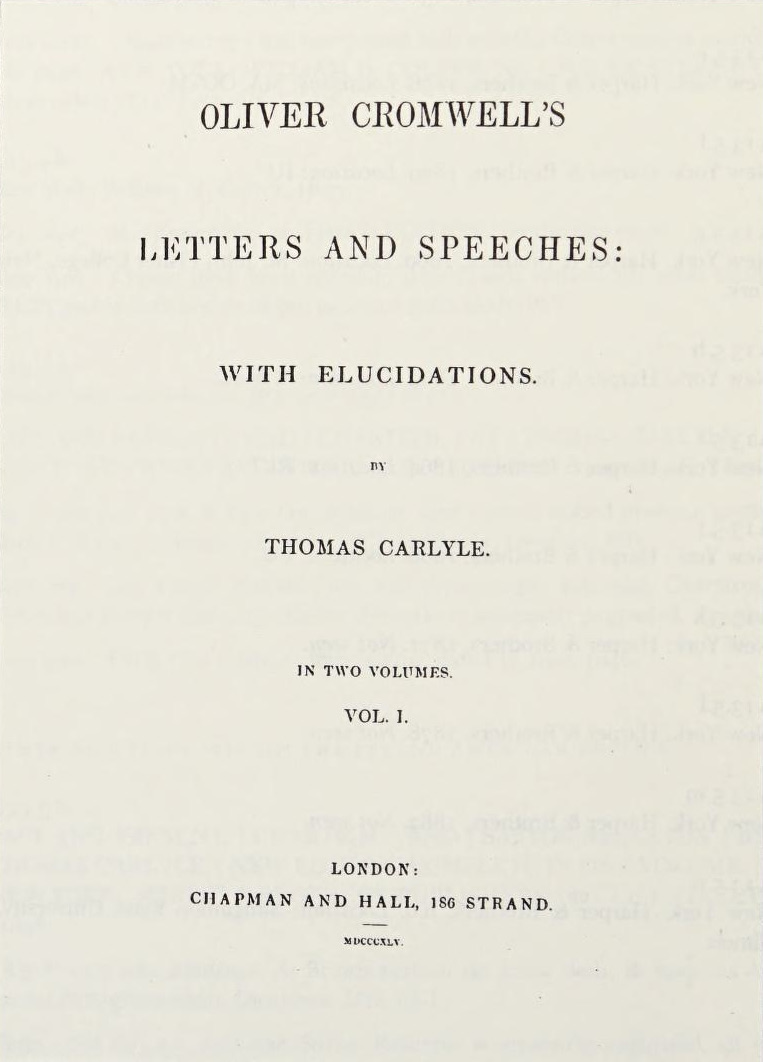
- Title page of the first English edition
- Author: Thomas Carlyle
- Language: English
- Subject: Oliver Cromwell
- Published: 1845
- Publisher: Chapman and Hall
- Publication place: England

Oliver Cromwell's Letters and Speeches: with Elucidations is a book, first published in 1845, by the Scottish essayist, historian and philosopher Thomas Carlyle. It "remains one of the most important works of British history published in the nineteenth and twentieth centuries."

== Composition ==
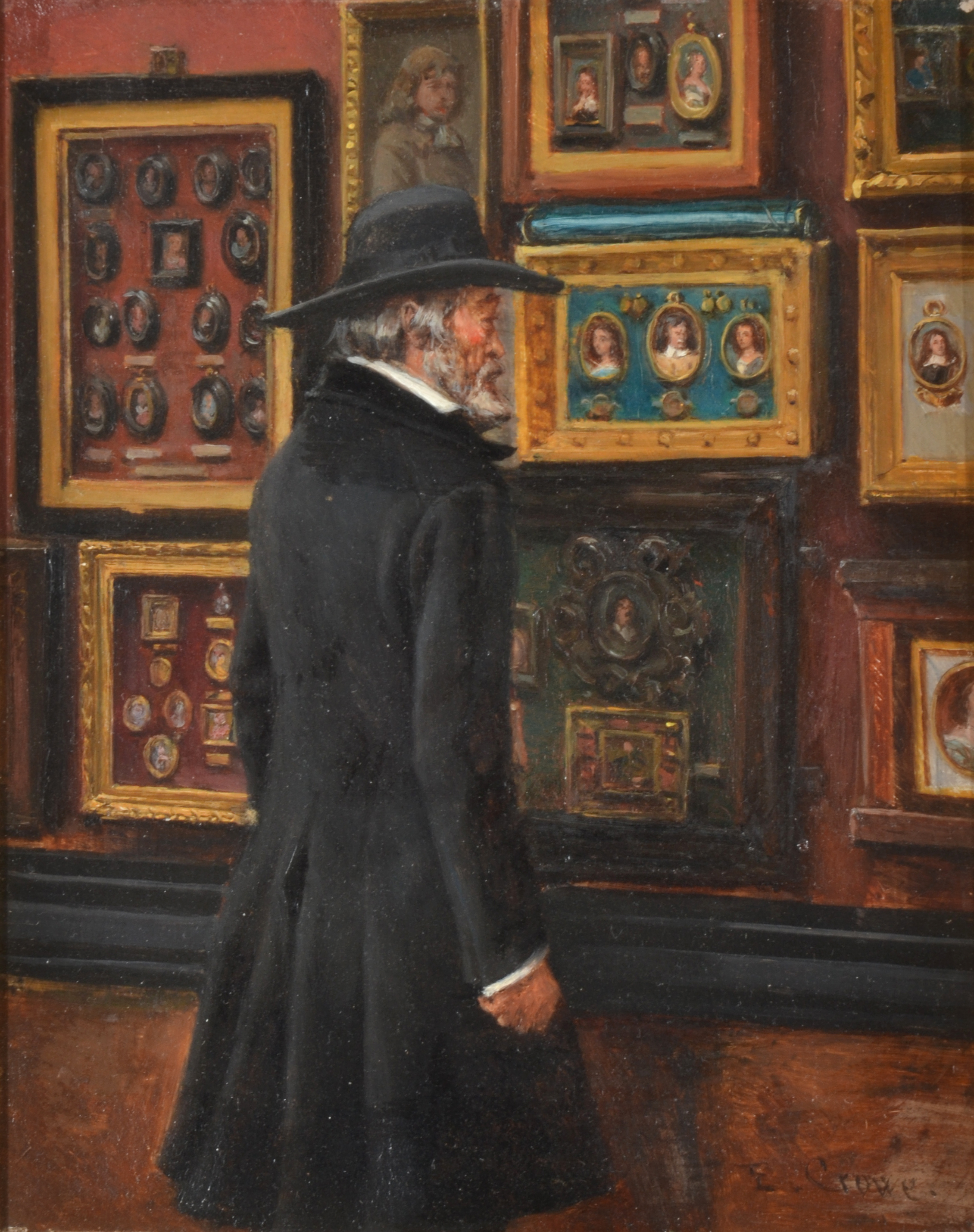
Thomas Carlyle Looking at the Duke of Buccleuch's Miniatures of Cromwell, his Wife and Daughter by Eyre Crowe, 1895

Carlyle was attracted to Oliver Cromwell as a subject due to their shared Protestant upbringing and biblical rhetorical style, as well as Cromwell's "sense of the divine vitality of the universe, his hostility to democracy, and his belief that heroes can be the agents of God's will."

Carlyle began writing with Cromwell in mind in 1840 but did not settle on Cromwell's letters and speeches as the focus of a book until late 1843. His first definitive statement that he would collect the letters and speeches comes in a letter to the poet Edward FitzGerald dated 9 January 1844 wherein he proposed "the gathering of all Oliver's Letters and Speeches, and stringing them together according to the order of time."

Carlyle was contemplating a biography of Cromwell when he concluded his initial work in October 1844. He wrote to FitzGerald on 8 February 1845 that "The Life must follow when it can." During the spring and summer of 1845 Carlyle added many annotations full of commentary and narrative to the gathering, which in effect became the biography that he wanted to write.

The publication of the first edition helped to turn up a large number of additional letters which Carlyle incorporated into a second edition published in June 1846. More letters accompanied the third edition of November 1849.

=== Squire papers ===
William Squire, a "practiced hoaxer", forwarded thirty-five letters to Carlyle, alleged to have been written by Cromwell to Samuel Squire, a cornet and auditor in Cromwell's army who in fact did not exist. Squire had written the letters himself. Believing them to be genuine, Carlyle published them in the December 1847 issue of Fraser's Magazine. Their authenticity was quickly questioned by critics, such as John Bruce of the Camden Society, Ralph Waldo Emerson, Thomas Babington Macaulay and Bernard Bolingbroke Woodward. Carlyle included the letters in the third edition on the advice of John Forster and Edward FitzGerald, despite the addition of a headnote to the appendix stating that they were "semi-romantic or Doubtful Documents of Oliver's History". In 1885 the historian Samuel Rawson Gardiner discovered evidence which contradicted assertions contained in the Squire papers, though William Aldis Wright still defended them as authentic. Finally, Walter Rye unearthed Squire's history of hoaxing, confirming that the letters were forgeries.

== Reception and influence ==
James Anthony Froude called it the nineteenth century's "most important contribution to English history," explaining that "with the clear sight of Oliver himself, we have a new conception of the Civil War and of its consequences." George Peabody Gooch wrote that "it was the proudest achievement of [Carlyle's] life to restore to England one of her greatest sons ... the 'Cromwelliad' remains a marvellous production." Wilbur Cortez Abbott called it "the greatest literary monument to the Protector's memory."

The book influenced the Transcendentalists and permeated popular American culture. Joel T. Headley's biography of Cromwell "recycled Carlyle for the masses," thereby influencing John Brown, who modelled himself after Cromwell as described by Headley.

== Bibliography ==
- Amigoni, David. Victorian Biography: Intellectuals and the Ordering of Discourse. Hemel Hempstead: Harvester Wheatsheaf, 1993.
- Blaine, Marlin E. "Carlyle's Cromwell and the Virtue of the Inarticulate." Carlyle Annual 13 (1992–1993): 77–88.
- McAllister, David (12 December 2012). ""A subject dead is not worth presenting": Cromwell, the Past, and the Haunting of Thomas Carlyle". Romanticism and Victorianism on the Net (59–60). doi:10.7202/1013274ar. ISSN 1916-1441.
- Morrow, John. "Heroes and Constitutionalists: The Ideological Significance of Thomas Carlyle's Treatment of the English Revolution." History of Political Thought 14 (1993): 205–23.
- Trela, D. J. A History of Carlyle's Oliver Cromwell's Letters and Speeches. Lewiston, N.Y.: Edwin Mellen Press, 1992.
- Worden, Blair (2000). "Thomas Carlyle and Oliver Cromwell" (PDF). Proceedings of the British Academy (105): 131–170.
