= Literary tourism =

Tourism based on places associated with locations in fiction

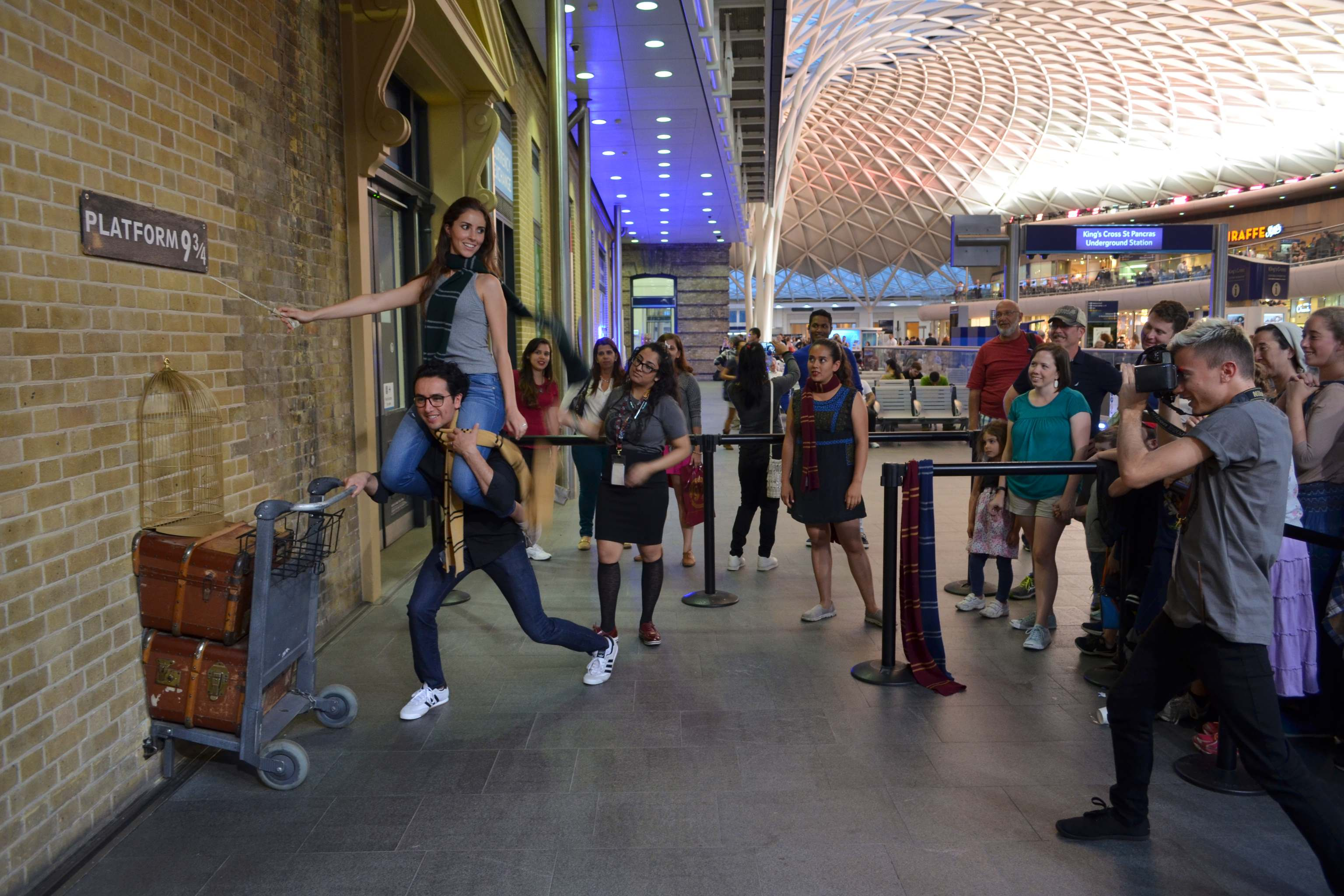
Harry Potter fans at King's Cross station

Literary tourism is a type of cultural tourism that deals with places and events from literary texts as well as the lives of their authors. This could include visiting particular place associated with a novel or a novelist, such as a writer's home, or grave site, following routes taken by a fictional characters, visiting places mentioned in poems, as well as visiting museums dedicated to specific writers, works, regional literatures, and literary genres.

== Characteristics ==
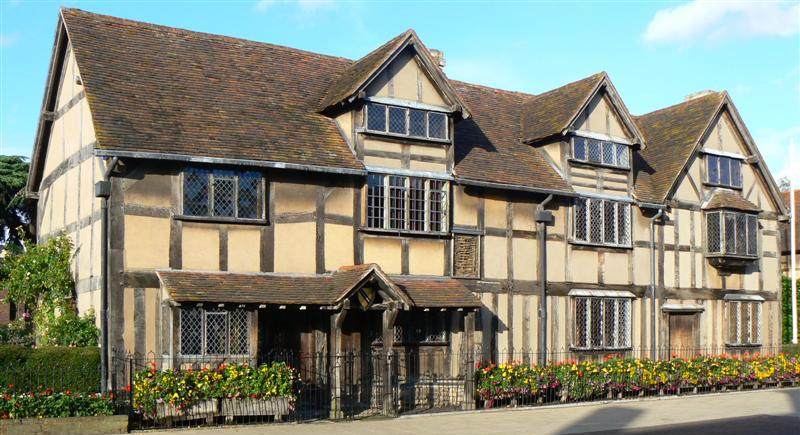
John Shakespeare's house, believed to be Shakespeare's birthplace, in Stratford-upon-Avon

Some scholars regard literary tourism as a contemporary type of secular pilgrimage. There are also long-distance walking routes associated with writers, such as the Hardy Way, which runs through Thomas Hardy's Wessex.

Literary tourists are specifically interested in how places have influenced writing and at the same time how writing has created place. In order to become a literary tourist you need only book-love and an inquisitive mindset; however, there are literary guides, literary maps, and literary tours to help you on your way. There are also many museums associated with writers, and these are often housed in buildings associated with a writer's birth or literary career, such as their home.

== Tourism fiction ==
While most literary tourism is focused on famous works, more modern works that are written to specifically promote tourism are called tourism fiction. Modern tourism fiction can include travel guides within the story showing readers how to visit the real places in the fictional tales. With recent technological advances in publishing, digital tourism fiction books can even allow literary tourists to follow direct links to tourism websites related to the story. This can be done on new e-reading devices like the Kindle, iPad, iPhone, smart phones, tablets, and regular desktop and laptop computers. These links within the story allow readers to instantly learn about the real places without doing their own web searches.

The first classic novel to take advantage of tourism fiction technology was F. Scott Fitzgerald's This Side of Paradise: Interactive Tourism Edition, published by the Southeastern Literary Tourism Initiative in 2012. The tourism edition offered web links to tours of Princeton University, where Fitzgerald attended in real life and where the fictional protagonist in the novel Amory Blaine attended. The tourism edition also offered links to Montgomery, Alabama, where Fitzgerald fell in love with his future wife Zelda Sayre, much like the fictional character Amory fell in love with Rosalind.

== Bookstore tourism ==
In addition to visiting author and book sites, literary tourists often engage in bookstore tourism, browsing local bookshops for titles specifically related to the sites as well as other regional books and authors.

== Tourism sites for specific writers and works, by country ==
=== China ===
- Du Fu Thatched Cottage, Chengdu
- Lu Xun Native Place

=== Egypt ===
- Cavafy Museum, Alexandria

=== France ===
- Maison de Balzac
- Maison de Victor Hugo
- House of George Sand

=== Germany ===
- Goethe House, Frankfurt
- Gutenberg Museum

=== Greece ===
- Drossinis Museum, Kifissia, Athens
- Nikos Kazantzakis Museum, Myrtia, Heraklion, Crete
- Papadiamantis House Museum, Skiathos

=== Japan ===
- Endo Shusaku Literary Museum, Nagasaki
- Lafcadio Hearn Memorial Museum
- Osamu Dazai Memorial Museum
- Picture Book Museum
- Saka no Ue no Kumo Museum, Matsuyama, Ehime
- Shiki Museum, Matsuyama, Ehime
- Tōson Memorial Museum

=== Netherlands ===
- Anne Frank House

=== United Kingdom ===
- Brantwood (John Ruskin)
- Brontë Parsonage
- Burns Cottage
- Carlyle's House
- Charles Dickens Museum
- Dove Cottage (William Wordsworth)
- Jane Austen's House Museum, Chawton
- Keats House
- Sherlock Holmes Museum

=== United States ===
- Edgar Allan Poe Cottage, Bronx, New York
- Ernest Hemingway House
- Longfellow House, Cambridge, Massachusetts
- Paul Laurence Dunbar House
- Walt Whitman House, Camden, New Jersey
- Rowan Oak, Mississippi
- Thurber House, Columbus, Ohio

== Regional literary tourism sites ==
=== Japan ===
- Kamakura Museum of Literature

=== South Africa ===
- KZN Literary Tourism, KwaZulu-Natal

=== South Korea ===
- Museum of Korean Modern Literature

== See also ==
- Film tourism
- Meisho
- Category:Literary museums
- Writer's home
