= Kazantzakis =

Kazantzakis may refer to the following:

- Nikos Kazantzakis (1883–1957), a Greek writer
- Nikos Kazantzakis Museum in Myrtia, Greece
- Kazantzakis (2017), a feature film directed by Yannis Smaragdis
- Heraklion International Airport "Nikos Kazantzakis", on Crete, Greece
- Nikos Kazantzakis (municipality), a former administrative division in Crete, Greece
- F/B N. Kazantzakis (1989-2001), a former vessel of Minoan Lines
