= MNK =

MNK may refer to:

- m,n,k-game, an abstract board game
- Marine Nationale Khmère (Khmer National Navy, the navy of the Khmer Republic)
- Mandinka language, a Mandé language spoken in western Africa
- MAPK-interacting kinase, a signalling protein
- Menkes disease, a disorder that affects copper levels in the body
- Methyl nonyl ketone, an oily organic liquid used in insect repellent
- Mallinckrodt, a pharmaceutical company with stock symbol MNK
- Mashd N Kutcher an Australian duo
- Mouse and keyboard, a gaming input

MNK is an abbreviation of:

- MNK, Muzeum Narodowe w Krakowie
- NMK, Nikos Kazantzakis Museum
