= Picture Book =

Picture Book may refer to:

- Picture book, a book format that combines visual and verbal narratives
- Picture Book (TV series), a 1955–1963 British children's series
- "Picture Book" (song), by the Kinks, 1968
- Picture Book (The Kinks album), 2008
- Picture Book (Simply Red album), 1985

== See also ==
- Picture Book Museum, Iwaki City, Fukushima Prefecture! Japan
- The Image Book, a 2018 Swiss film directed by Jean-Luc Godard
