= Apartment of Stefan Żeromski at the Royal Castle, Warsaw =

Coordinates: 52°14′52″N 21°0′51″E

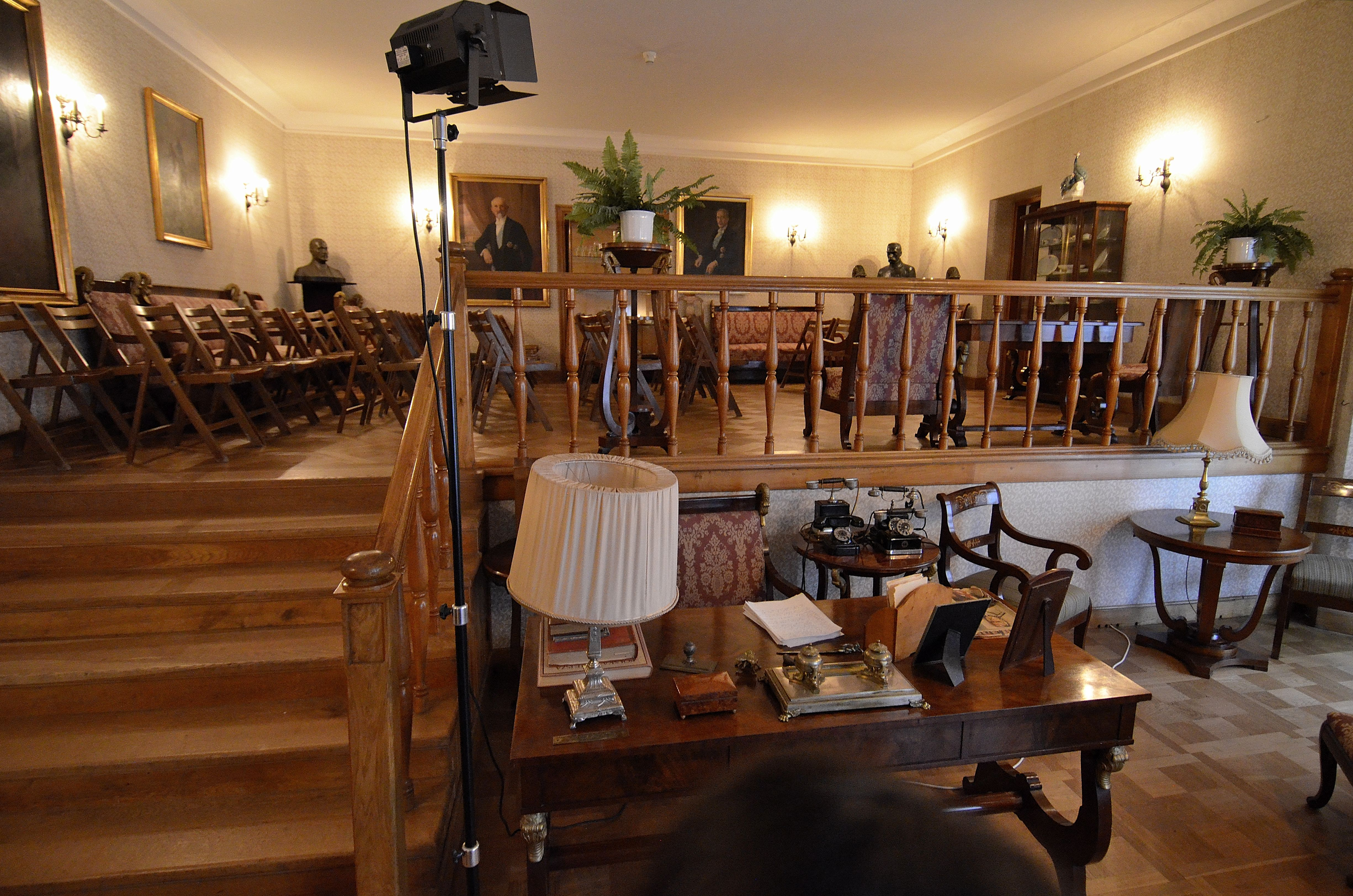
- Location: Royal Castle; Warsaw, Poland
- Type: Museum
- Website: www.zamek-krolewski.pl/zwiedzanie/ekspozycje-stale/mieszkanie-zeromskiego

Apartment of Stefan Żeromski at the Royal Castle in Warsaw (Mieszkanie Stefana Żeromskiego na Zamku Królewskim w Warszawie) is a writer's house museum in Warsaw, Poland. It is the apartment room that Stefan Zeromski, a Polish novelist and dramatist, once stayed in.
