= Walt Whitman Museum =

Walt Whitman Museum may refer to:

- Walt Whitman Birthplace, Huntington, NY, the Walt Whitman Birthplace State Historic Site and Interpretive Center.
- Walt Whitman House, Camden, NJ, the famous poet's last residence.
