= Writer's home =

Location where a writer lived

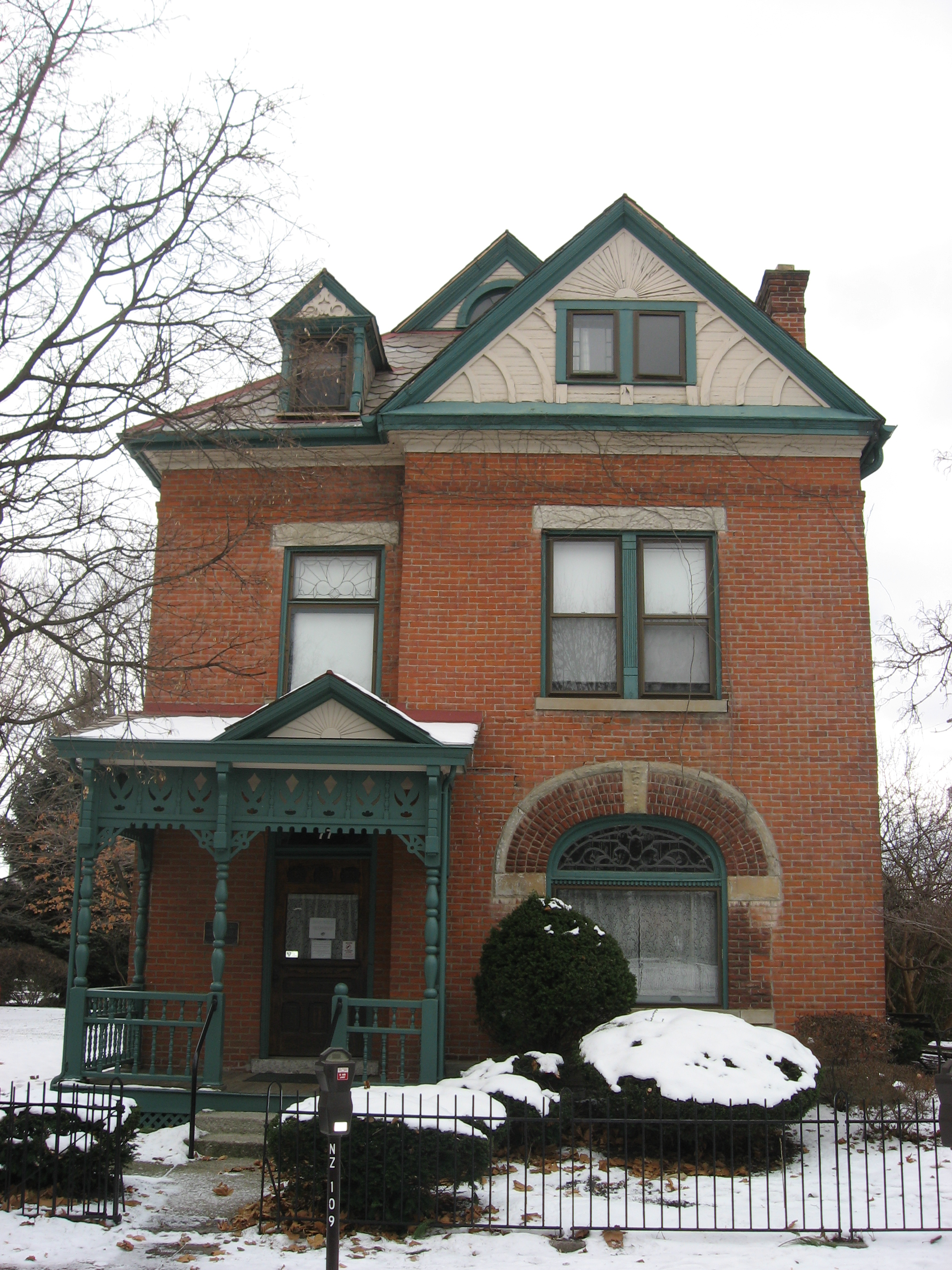
The James Thurber House in Columbus, Ohio

Writers' homes (sometimes writer's, author's or literary houses) are locations where writers lived. Frequently, these homes are preserved as historic house museums and literary tourism destinations, called writer's home museums, especially when the homes are those of famous authors. Frequently these buildings are preserved to communicate to visitors more about the author than their work and its historical context. These exhibits are a form of biographical criticism. Visitors of the sites who are participating in literary tourism, are often fans of the authors, and these fans find deep emotional and physical connections to the authors through their visits.

Sites include a range of activities common to cultural heritage sites, such as living history, museum exhibits, guided tours, and poetry readings. New York Times commentator Anne Trubek counted 73 such houses in the United States.

The tradition of preserving houses or sites important to famous authors has a long history: in the 14th century Petrarch's birthplace was preserved, despite Petrarch barely spending time there as a child. In the late nineteenth and early twentieth century France, photojournalism which represented authors homes created an increased public interest in writers' private lives, making their homes destinations.

The public popular imagination around these literary homes is a central theme of the satirical novel An Arsonist's Guide to Writers' Homes in New England.

== Notable homes ==
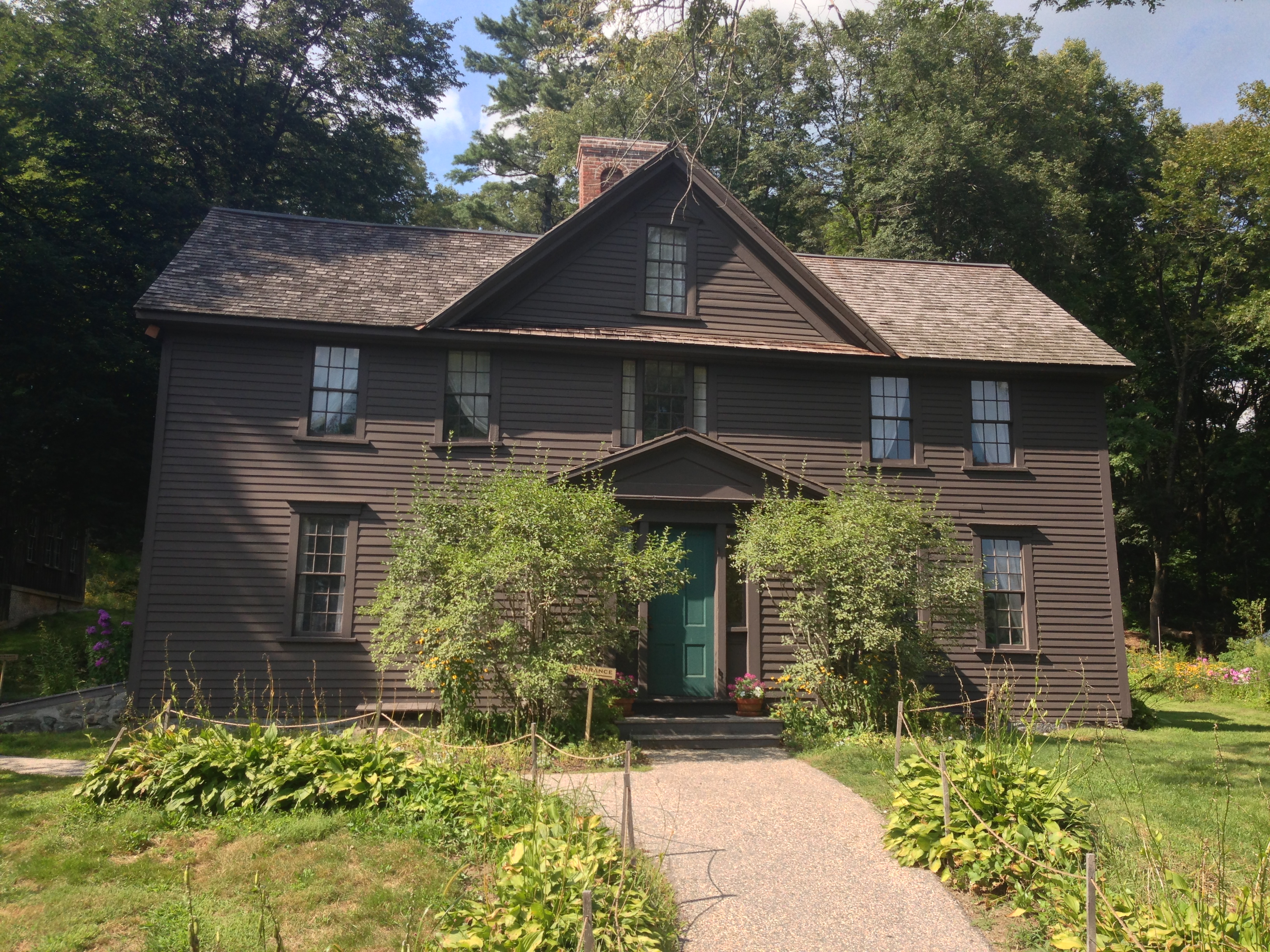
The Orchard House, home of Louisa May Alcott

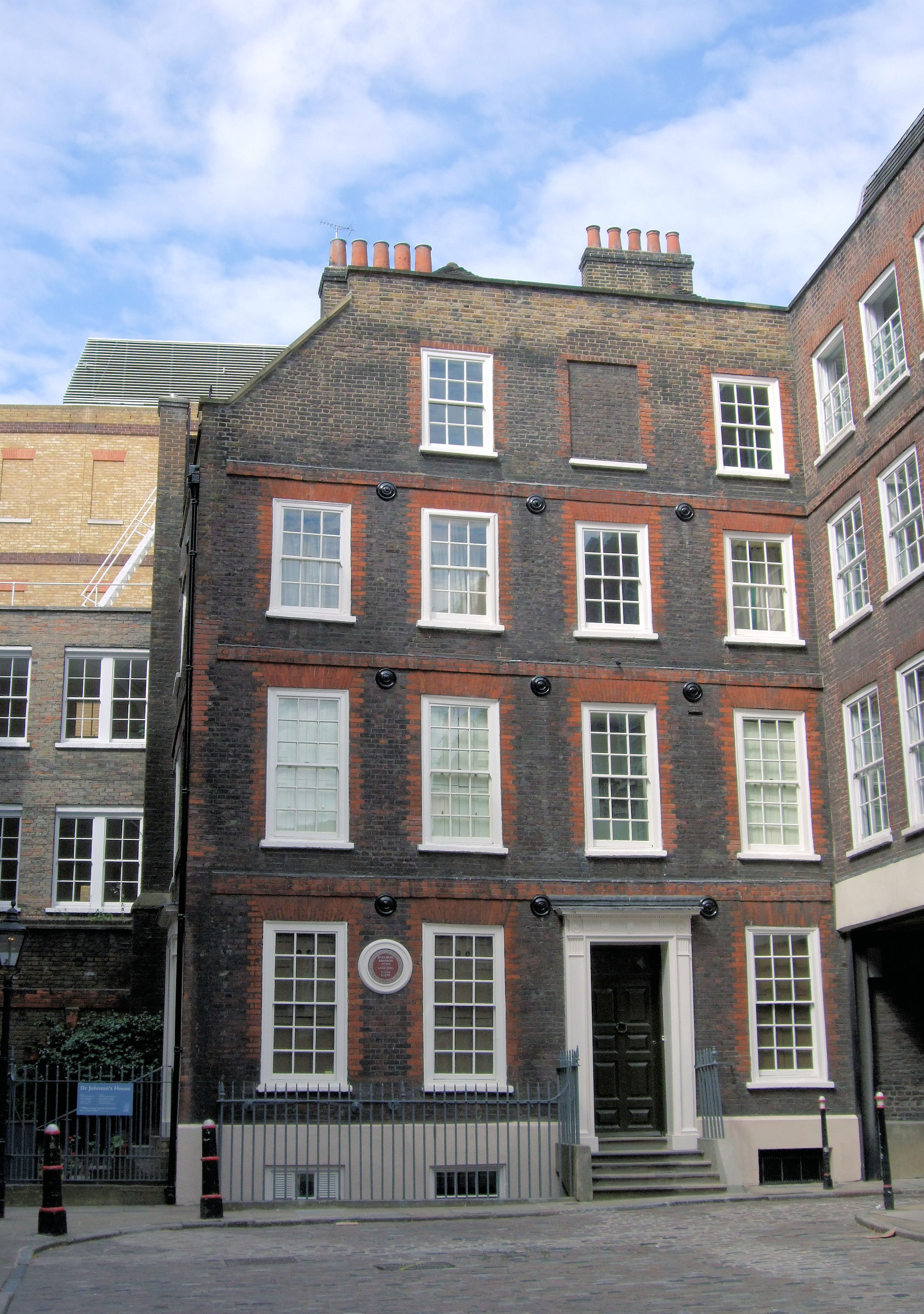
Dr. Johnson's House

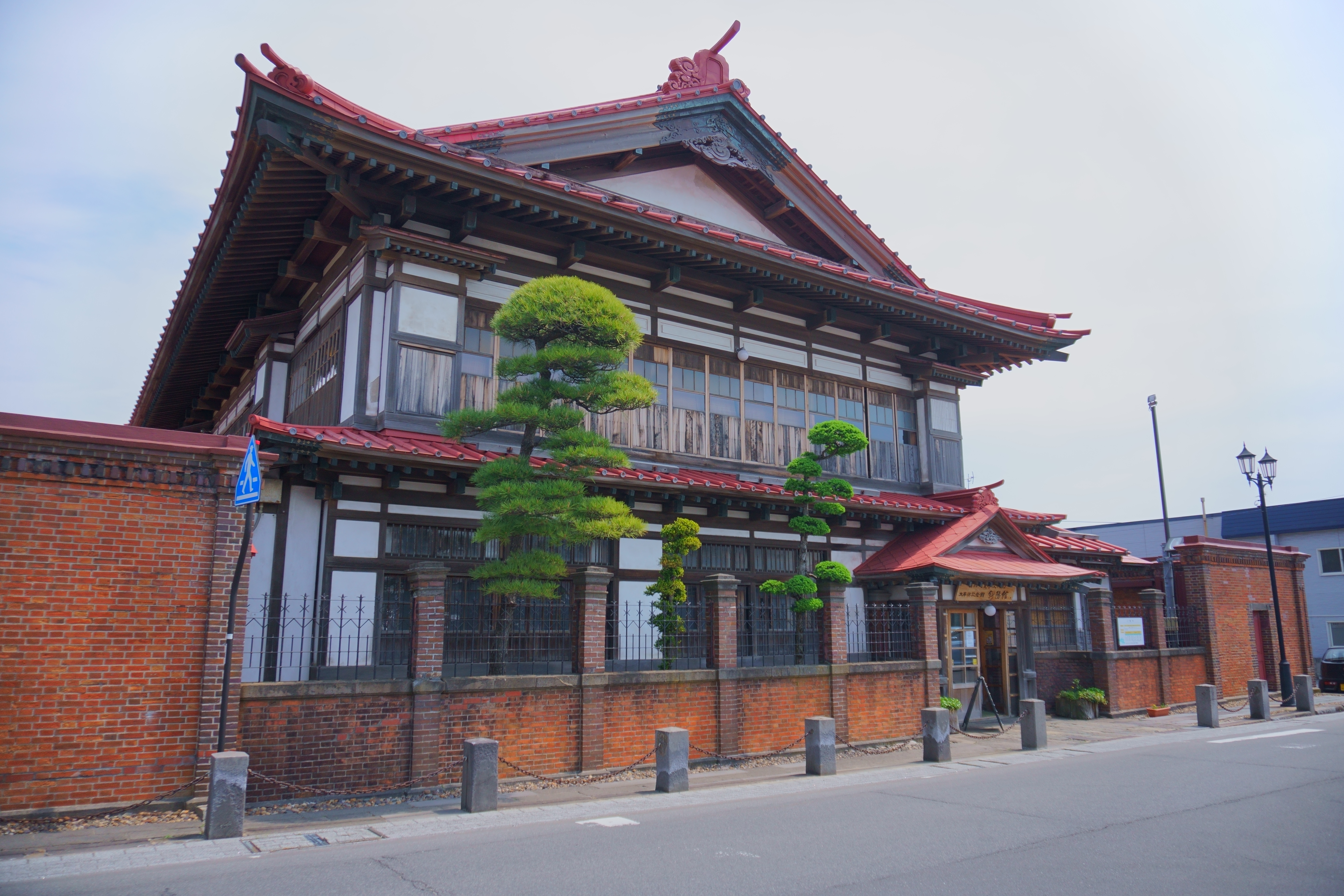
Osamu Dazai Memorial Museum

- Orchard House (Louisa May Alcott)
- Jane Austen's House Museum
- Alexander Bestuzhev House
- Brontë Parsonage Museum
- Green Hills Farm (Pearl S. Buck)
- Mikhail Bulgakov Museum: Kyiv, Moscow
- Robert Burns Cottage
- Newstead Abbey (Lord Byron)
- Carlyle's House (Thomas Carlyle's house in London)
- Craigenputtock (Thomas Carlyle's estate in Scotland)
- Casa de Cervantes
- Melikhovo and White Dacha (Anton Chekhov)
- Greenway Estate (Agatha Christie)
- John Clare Cottage
- Manning Clark House
- Jean Cocteau House
- Coleridge Cottage (Samuel Taylor Coleridge)
- Firefly Estate (Noël Coward)
- Cowper and Newton Museum (William Cowper)
- Osamu Dazai Memorial Museum
- Charles Dickens Museum
- Emily Dickinson Museum
- Château de Monte-Cristo (Alexandre Dumas)
- Rowan Oak (William Faulkner)
- Goldeneye (Ian Fleming)
- Anne Frank House
- Elizabeth Gaskell's House
- Goethe's House and Birthplace
- Edward Gorey House
- Thomas Hardy's Cottage and Max Gate
- Ernest Hemingway House and Cottage
- William Sydney Porter House (O.Henry)
- James Herriot's home
- Schillerhaus, Leipzig (Ludwig Ferdinand Huber)
- Maison de Victor Hugo
- Dr Samuel Johnson's House and Birthplace
- John Keats House and Keats–Shelley House
- Bateman's (Rudyard Kipling)
- Clouds Hill (T. E. Lawrence)
- Tarkhany (Mikhail Lermontov)
- Lope de Vega's house
- Arrowhead (Herman Melville)
- Milton's Cottage (John Milton)
- Margaret Mitchell House and Museum
- Rozhdestveno Estate (Vladimir Nabokov)
- Monte Cristo Cottage (Eugene O'Neill)
- Edgar Allan Poe House and Museum
- Hill Top (Beatrix Potter)
- Abbotsford (Sir Walter Scott)
- Shakespeare's Birthplace
- John Steinbeck House (Salinas, California)
- Shandy Hall (Laurence Sterne)
- Harriet Beecher Stowe House (Brunswick, Cincinnati, Hartford)
- Farringford House (Alfred, Lord Tennyson)
- Dylan Thomas Boathouse
- James Thurber House
- Yasnaya Polyana (Leo Tolstoy)
- Mark Twain House
- Strawberry Hill House (Horace Walpole)
- The Mount (Edith Wharton)
- Highbury (Patrick White)
- Walt Whitman House
- Monk's House (Virginia Woolf)
- Dove Cottage and Rydal Mount (William Wordsworth)
- Yr Ysgwrn (Hedd Wyn (Ellis Humphrey Evans))
- Casa Stefan Zweig (Stefan Zweig)
- Villa Ocampo (Victoria Ocampo)
- Writers' House, Poland (several authors)

== See also ==
- List of residences of American writers
- Category:Literary museums
