= Raray =

- Commune
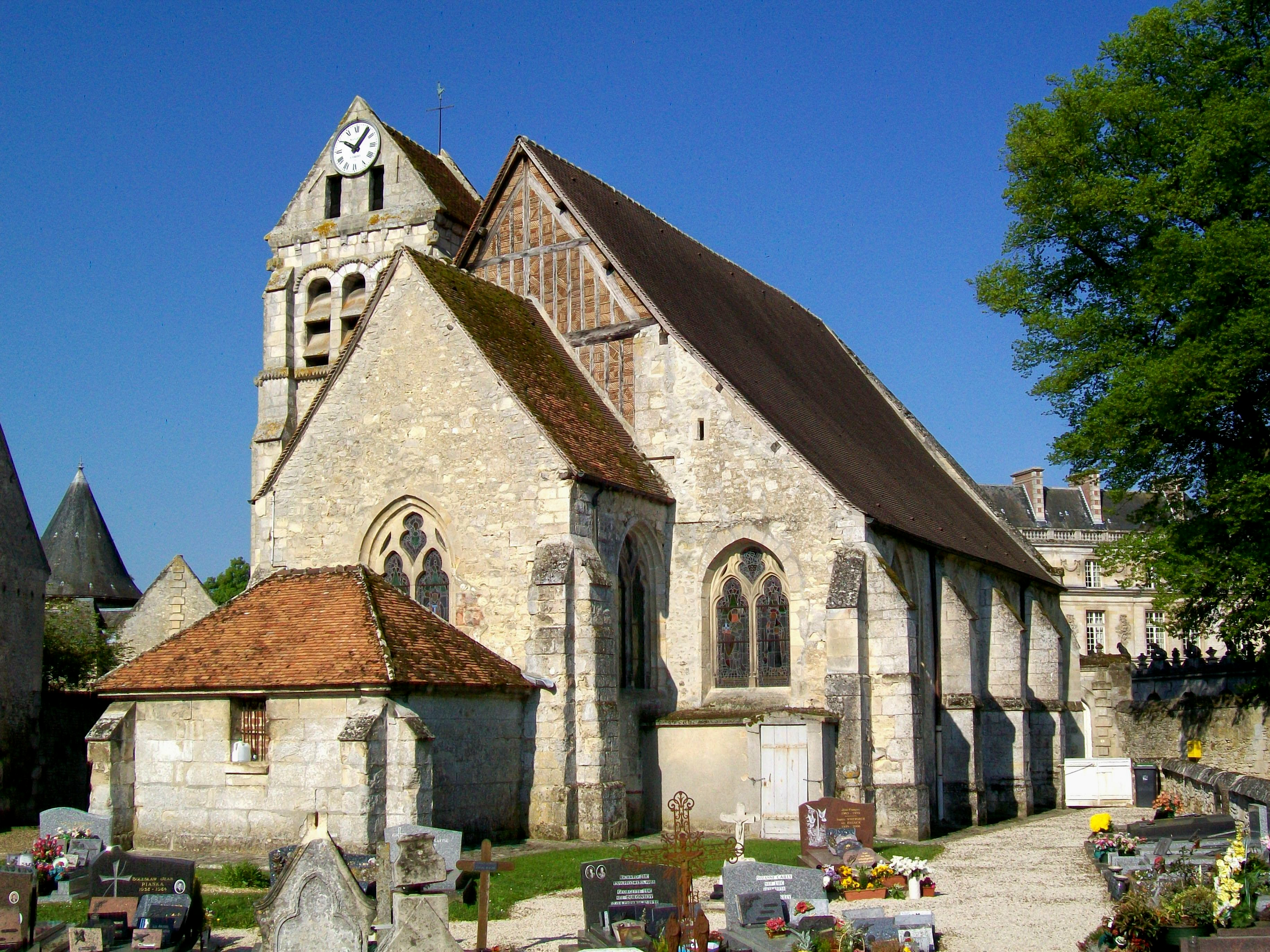
- The church in Raray
- Location of Raray
- Location within France Location within Hauts-de-France
- Coordinates: 49°15′37″N 2°42′55″E
- Country: France
- Region: Hauts-de-France
- Department: Oise
- Arrondissement: Senlis
- Canton: Pont-Sainte-Maxence
- Intercommunality: Senlis Sud Oise

Government
  - Mayor (2020–2026): Jean-Marc Huchet de la Bedoyère
- Area^{1}: 6.72 km^{2} (2.59 sq mi)
- Elevation: 104 m (341 ft)
- Highest elevation: 115 m (377 ft)
- Lowest elevation: 85 m (279 ft)
- Population (2023): 127
  - Density: 18.9/km^{2} (48.9/sq mi)
- Time zone: UTC+01:00 (CET)
  - Summer (DST): UTC+02:00 (CEST)
- INSEE/Postal code: 60525 /60810
- ^{1} French Land Register data, which excludes lakes, ponds, glaciers > 1 km^{2} (0.386 sq mi or 247 acres) and river estuaries.

Raray (French pronunciation: [ʁaʁɛ]) is a commune in the Oise department in the Hauts-de-France region of northern France. Raray is located in the agricultural plain of the Valois, 11 km northeast of Senlis and 13 km west of Crépy-en-Valois. The commune of Raray consists of the village that gave it its name and the hamlet of La Borde, located at the northeastern end of the municipal territory. This hamlet is reduced to a farm and a few houses.

== History ==
In 2019, the commune had 127 inhabitants. The evolution of the number of inhabitants is known throughout the population censuses conducted in the town since 1793.

Raray has six monuments within its territory, including the Château Raray, its balustrades, and two other related architectural complexes.

== Château ==
Château Raray is a castle whose initial construction dates back to 1522, though little of the original building remains. It was inhabited from 1610 to 1620 by Nicolas de Lancy, advisor to Louis XIII and chamberlain of the Duke of Orleans, and later, from 1766 to 1781, by Lord Antoine-Claude Henry and his eldest son Henry Francis. It was modernized between 1890 and 1914 by Henri de La Bédoyère.

In 1945, Château Castle served as the location of some scenes from the movie Beauty and the Beast by Jean Cocteau. In 1988, a golf course was developed in the park.

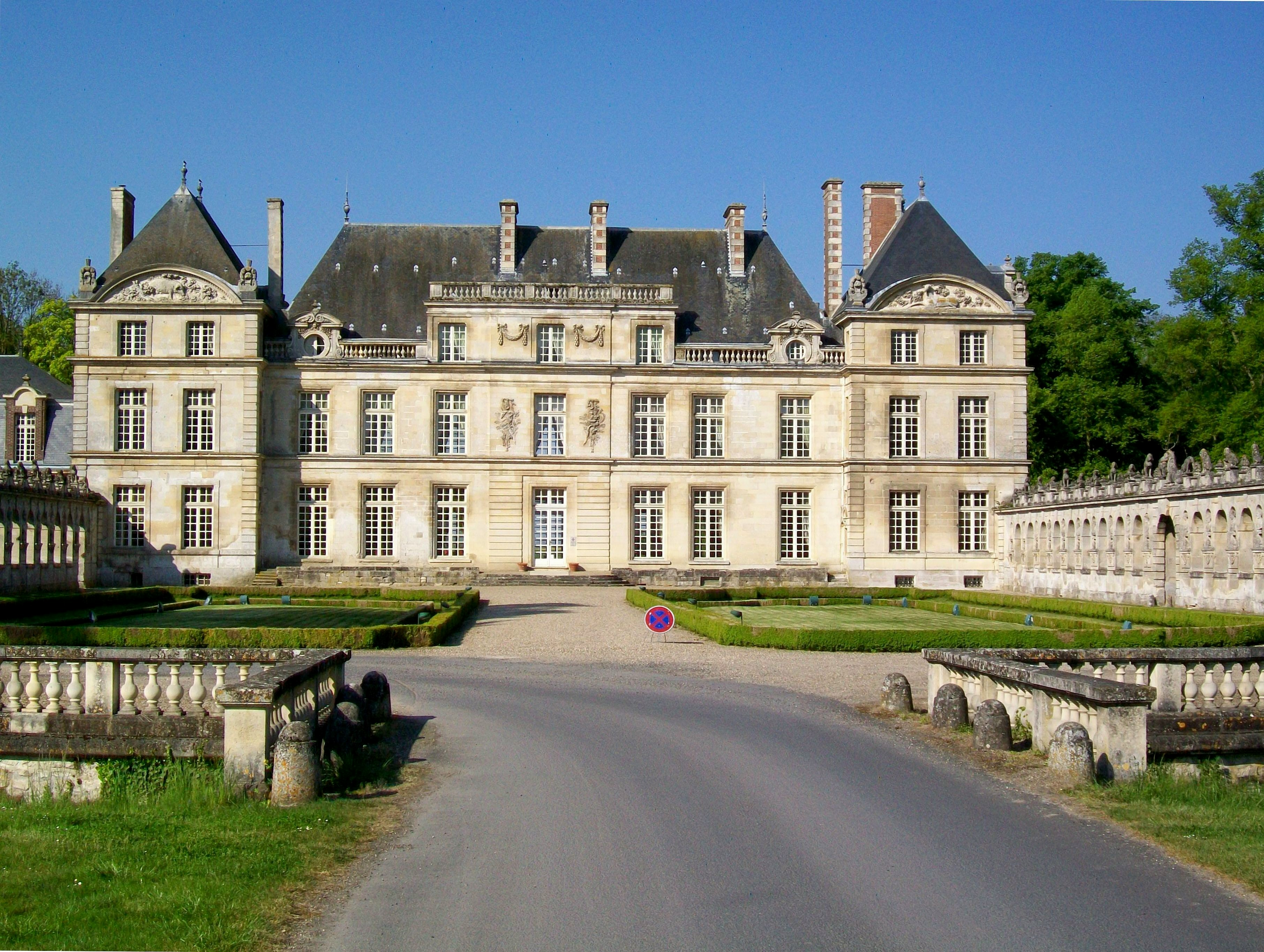
Château de Raray, also a National Heritage Site

== See also ==
- Communes of the Oise department
