= Tourism fiction =

Fiction written to promote tourism

Tourism fiction is a genre of fiction that is written to generate tourism to specific areas and places. This is done by setting the fiction in real attractions and including short travel guides within the story showing readers how to visit the real places.

Tourism fiction can often be confused with literary tourism. Literary tourism refers to the tourism that naturally develops around places from famous literary works and authors, but tourism fiction refers to modern works written to specifically promote tourism.

Tourism fiction has taken advantage of modern technological advances in publishing, such as digital books with embedded web links. Digital tourism fiction novels and short story can offer readers direct web links inside the work that lead to the websites of the real attractions. This can be done on new devices like the Kindle, iPad, iPhone, desktop or laptop computers, and other smart phones and tablet devices.

The first tourism fiction novel with a fully integrated digital travel guide was Blind Fate by Patrick Brian Miller, published on Kindle in 2010. That novel was set in Montgomery, Alabama, and offered the first tourism guide with embedded web links inside the story that led to real websites. Other tourism fiction novels are being developed that will include such travel guides in both print and digital editions.

The first classic novel to take advantage of tourism fiction technology was F. Scott Fitzgerald's This Side of Paradise: Interactive Tourism Edition, which offered tourism guides to the original novel's setting of Princeton University, where Fitzgerald attended in real life. The tourism edition also linked readers to the website of the F. Scott and Zelda Fitzgerald Museum in Montgomery, Alabama, where Fitzgerald fell in love with his future wife Zelda Sayre.

The first website to offer online guides with links to the real settings of modern novels was the Southeastern Literary Tourism Initiative (SELTI), launched in 2009. SELTI offered online readers tourism fiction articles with excerpts from tourism-themed novels, photos of the real places, and short travel guides with links going to the websites of the real places.

SELTI also initiated the nation's first tourism fiction contest in 2012, offering the first academic guidelines for judging tourism fiction. Since 2012, SELTI has awarded thousands of dollars to the winners of its annual writing contests. The winners have received bipartisan support and recognition in the U.S. Congress from Republican representative Bradley Byrne and Democratic representative Terri Sewell.

The SELTI project has received financial and resource assistance, such as grant money and photos, from the United States federal government, several state governments, and many municipal governments in developing tourism writing projects and features for attractions around the South.
