= Cavafy Museum =

Apartment museum in Alexandria, Egypt

Coordinates: 31.197582°N 29.90128°E

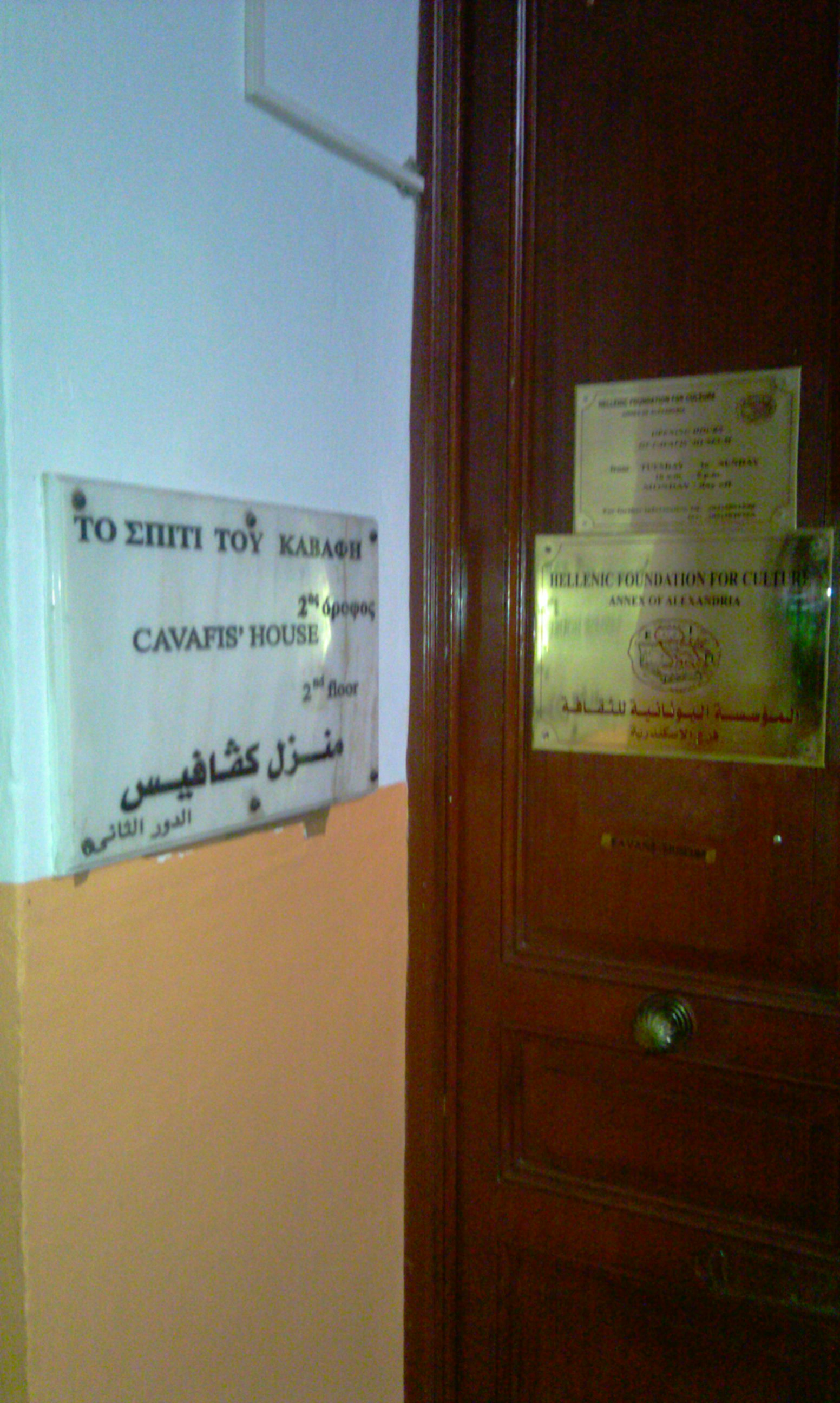
Entrance to Contantine P. Cavafy's long residency apartment in Alexandria, Egypt, which is now the site of the Cavafy Museum

Cavafy Museum is an apartment museum in the center of Alexandria, Egypt, which formerly was the residence of the Greek poet Constantine P. Cavafy, where he lived most of his life.

== Location ==
The apartment is located near Alexandria Opera House (Fouad St.), in Attarin division, Alexandria. The street name was Lepsius during Cavafy's life; it was renamed Sharm El Sheikh, then after the museum was opened, the narrow and short street became Cavafy Street, which is quite close to two of the city's most important streets, Fouad St. and Safiya Zaghloul St.

== Opening ==
In 1977, on the initiative of the then Consul General of Greece in Alexandria, Nikolaos Kapellaris, the first Cavafy Museum was created, housed in the premises of the Consulate General. In 1991, Kostis Moskof, who was then cultural attaché at the Greek Embassy in Cairo, had the initiative of the conversion of Cavafy's apartment into a museum. This initiative was made possible thanks to the sponsorship of Stratis Stratigakis, founder of the homonymous institutes based in Thessaloniki. The first nine-year lease of the apartment was signed on behalf of the Greek State by the then Consul General of Greece in Alexandria Panayotis D. Cangelaris. Most of the exhibits that existed in the premises of the Consulate General were transferred there. The apartment was inaugurated and opened to the public on 16 November 1992 by the then Deputy Minister for National Education and Religious Affairs, Vyron Polydoras.

The entrance was free until 2014. Now the tickets are 15 L.E. and 5 L.E. for students.

== Background ==
There are other museums dedicated to Cavafy in other cities, including a newly opened museum in Plaka, Athens.

The poet and his living place were mentioned many times in Lawrence Durrell's Alexandria Quartet, and Where the Tigers Were: Travels through Literary Landscapes by Don Meredith.

== Collections ==
The small-size museum displays letters, notes and poems written by Cavafy, Many portraits, drawings and photographs of Cavafy and close friends, a room dedicated to writer and close friend Stratis Tsirkas as it was his room when he lived with Cavafy for some time. The apartment has many published books and papers on the author, including many translations in Greek, Arabic, English and other 15 languages, and more than 3,000 scholarly articles.

== Gallery ==
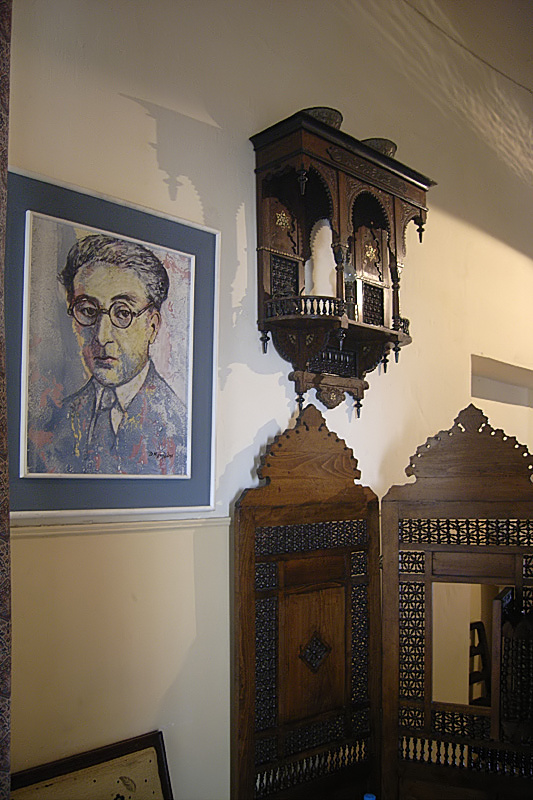
A room contains a posthumous portrait of Cavafy and portraits of friends.

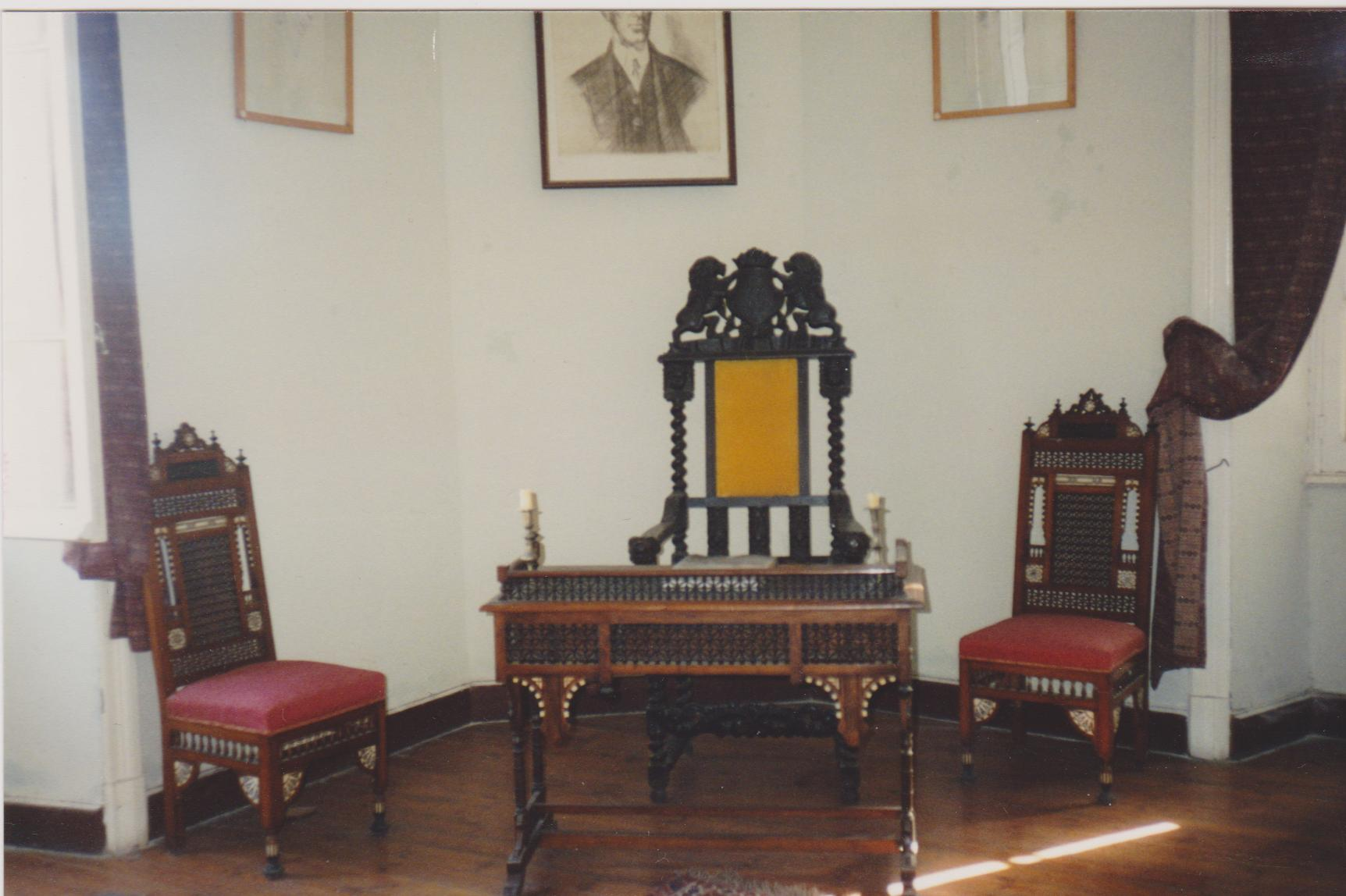
A room in Cavafy museum with a balcony

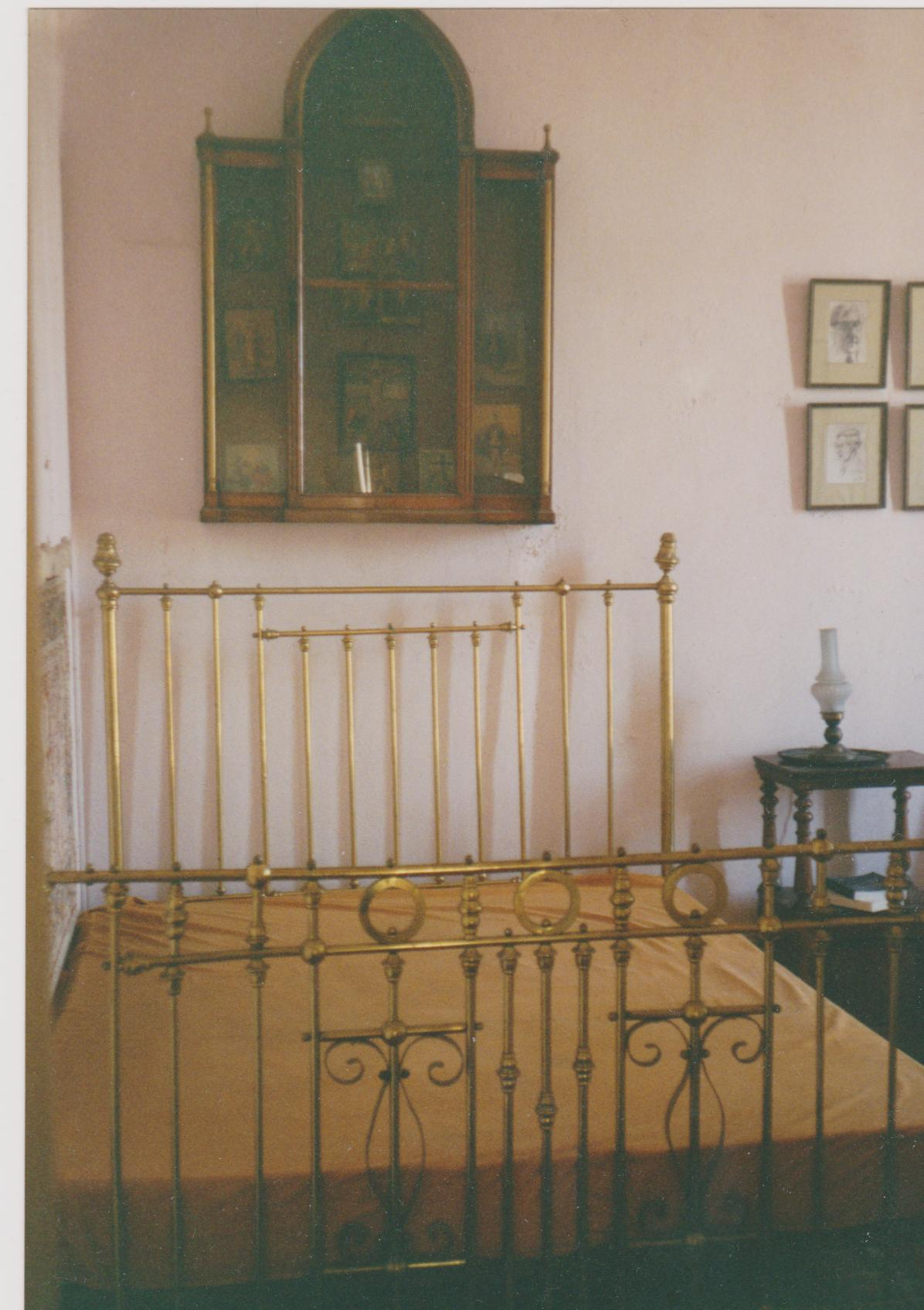
A room contains a bed and a closet, along with portraits of Cavafy.

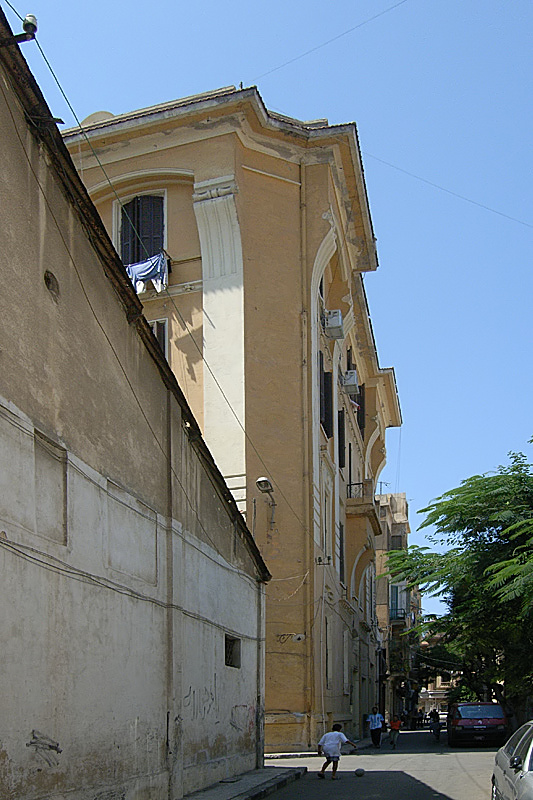
Building of Cavafy's apartment-museum in Alexandria
