= Beauty and the Beast (1946 film) =

1946 film by Jean Cocteau

- Film poster
- Directed by: Jean Cocteau
- Screenplay by: Jean Cocteau
- Based on: Beauty and the Beast by Jeanne-Marie Leprince de Beaumont
- Produced by: André Paulvé
- Starring: Jean Marais; Josette Day; Marcel André; Mila Parély; Nane Germon; Michel Auclair
- Cinematography: Henri Alekan
- Edited by: Claude Ibéria
- Music by: Georges Auric
- Distributed by: DisCina
- Release date: 29 October 1946
- Running time: 93 minutes
- Country: France
- Language: French
- Box office: 4,202,951 admissions (France)

Beauty and the Beast (French: La Belle et la Bête – also the UK title) is a 1946 French surrealist romantic fantasy film directed by French poet and filmmaker Jean Cocteau. Starring Josette Day as Belle and Jean Marais as the Beast, it is an adaptation of the 1756 story Beauty and the Beast, written by Jeanne-Marie Leprince de Beaumont and published as part of a fairy tale anthology.

The plot of Cocteau's film revolves around Belle's father, who is sentenced to death for picking a rose from the Beast's garden. Belle offers to go back to the Beast in her father's place. The Beast falls in love with her and proposes marriage on a nightly basis, which she initially refuses. Belle eventually becomes more drawn to the Beast, who tests her by letting her return home to her family, and telling her that if she does not return to him within a week, he will die of grief.

Beauty and the Beast is now recognized as a classic of French cinema. It holds a 96% rating on the review aggregator Rotten Tomatoes, based on 67 reviews.

== Plot ==
While scrubbing the floor at home, Belle is interrupted by her brother's friend Avenant, who tells her she deserves better and suggests they get married. Belle rejects Avenant, as she wishes to stay home and take care of her father, who has suffered much since his ships were lost at sea and the family fortune along with them. Belle's father arrives home announcing he has come into a great fortune that he will pick up the next day, along with gifts for his daughters, Belle and her shrewish sisters Adelaide and Felicie. Belle's roguish brother Ludovic, believing they will soon be wealthy, signs a contract from a moneylender allowing him the ability to sue Ludovic's father if he can not pay. Belle's sisters ask for a monkey and a parrot as gifts, but Belle asks only for a rose.

However, the next day, Belle's father finds on his arrival that his fortune has been seized to clear his debts and he is as penniless as before. He has no money for lodging and is forced to return home through a forest at night. He gets lost in the forest and finds himself at a large castle whose gates and doors magically open themselves. On entering the castle, he is guided by an enchanted candelabra that leads him to a laden dinner table where he falls asleep. Awakened by a loud roar, he wanders the castle's grounds. Remembering that Belle asked for a rose, he plucks a rose from a tree which makes the Beast appear. The Beast threatens to kill him for theft but suggests that one of his daughters can take his place. The Beast offers his horse Magnificent to guide him through the forest and to his home.

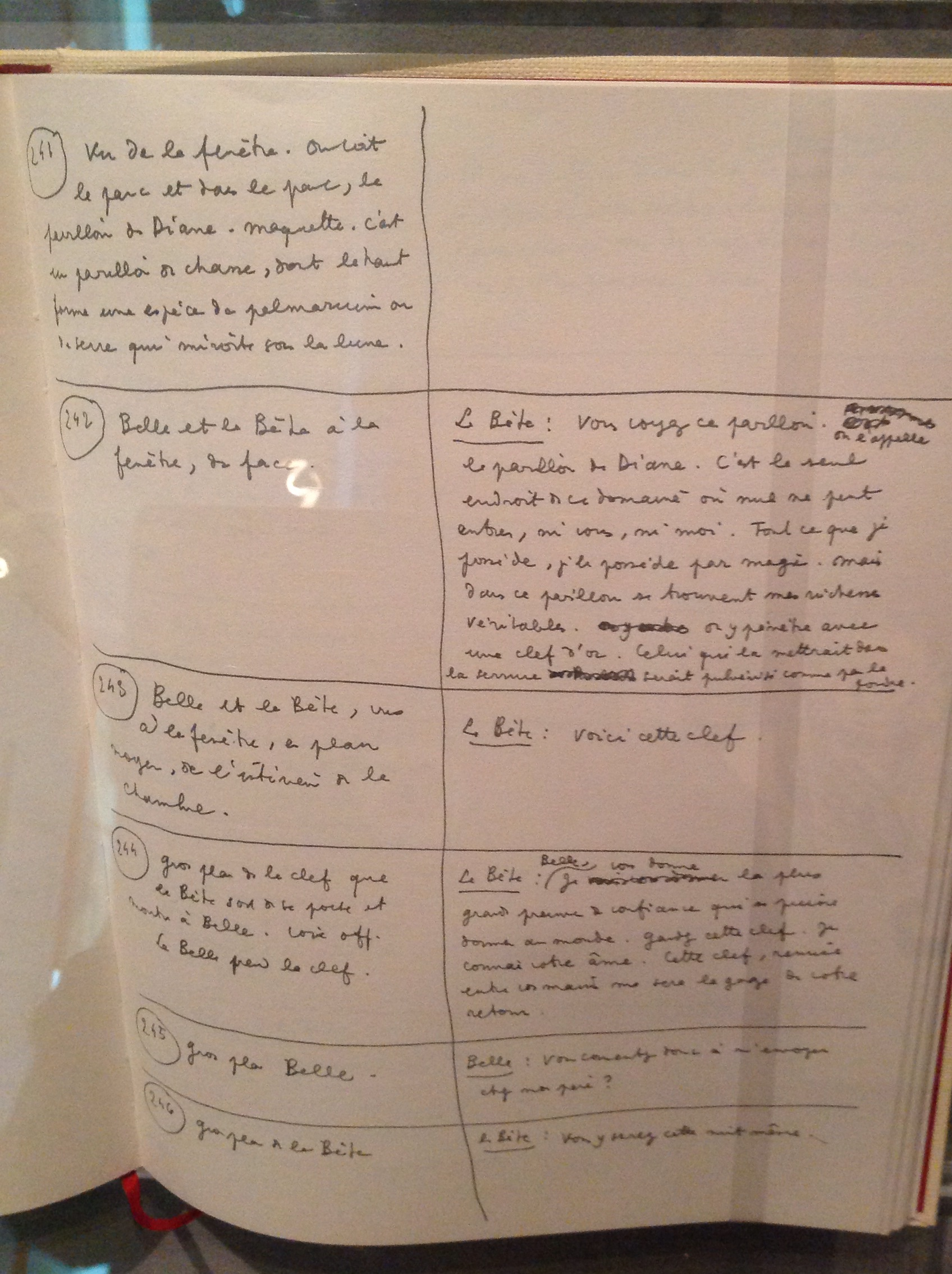
Page of the original scenario on display in the Jean Cocteau House in Milly-la-Foret, France

Belle's father explains the situation to his family and Avenant. Belle agrees to take her father's place and rides Magnificent to the castle. Upon meeting the Beast, Belle faints at his monstrous appearance and is carried to her room in the castle. Belle awakens to find a magic mirror which allows her to see anything. The Beast invites Belle to dinner, where he tells her that she is in equal command to him and that she will be asked every day to marry him. Days pass as Belle grows more accustomed to and fond of the Beast, but she continues to refuse marriage. Using the magic mirror, Belle sees that her father has become deathly ill. Belle begs for permission to visit her family and the Beast reluctantly grants her permission to leave for a week. He gives Belle two magical items; a glove that can transport her wherever she wishes and a golden key that unlocks Diana's Pavilion, the source of the Beast's true riches. He tells Belle that he gives her these precious items to show his trust in her, and says that if she does not return at the end of the week, he will die of grief.

Belle uses the glove to appear in her bedridden father's room, where her visit restores him to health. Belle finds her family living in poverty, having never recovered from Ludovic's deal with the moneylender. Jealous of Belle's rich life at the castle, Adelaide and Felicie steal her golden key and devise a plan to turn Ludovic and Avenant against the Beast. Avenant and Ludovic devise a plan of their own to kill the Beast, and agree to aid Belle's sisters. To stall Belle, her sisters trick her into staying past her seven-day limit by pretending to love her. Belle reluctantly agrees to stay.

The Beast sends Magnificent with the magic mirror to retrieve Belle but Ludovic and Avenant find Magnificent first, and ride him to the castle. Belle later finds the mirror which reveals the Beast's sorrowful face in its reflection. Belle realizes she is missing the golden key as the mirror breaks. Distraught, Belle returns to the castle using the magic glove and finds the Beast in the courtyard, near death from a broken heart.

Meanwhile, Avenant and Ludovic stumble upon Diana's Pavilion. Thinking that their stolen key may trigger a trap, they scale the wall of the Pavilion. As the Beast dies in Belle's arms, Avenant breaks into the Pavilion through its glass roof, whereupon he is shot with an arrow by an animated statue of the Roman goddess, Diana and is himself turned into a Beast. As this happens, arising from where the Beast lay dead is Prince Ardent, who is cured of being the Beast. He explains that because his parents did not believe in spirits, the spirits had turned him into the Beast as revenge. Prince Ardent and Belle embrace, then fly away to his kingdom where she will be his queen. He promises that her father will stay with them and Belle's sisters will carry the train of her gown.

== Cast ==
- Jean Marais as Beast/Ardent/Avenant
- Josette Day as Belle
- Marcel André as Belle's Father
- Mila Parély as Félicie
- Nane Germon as Adélaïde
- Michel Auclair as Ludovic
- Raoul Marco as The Usurer

== Production ==
=== Writing ===
After the opening credits, Cocteau briefly breaks the fourth wall with a written preamble:

L'enfance croit ce qu'on lui raconte et ne le met pas en doute. Elle croit qu'une rose qu'on cueille peut attirer des drames dans une famille. Elle croit que les mains d'une bête humaine qui tue se mettent à fumer et que cette bête en a honte lorsqu'une jeune fille habite sa maison. Elle croit mille autres choses bien naïves.

C'est un peu de cette naïveté que je vous demande et, pour nous porter chance à tous, laissez-moi vous dire quatre mots magiques, véritable «sésame ouvre-toi» de l'enfance:

Il était une fois...

Children believe what we tell them. They have complete faith in us. They believe that a rose plucked from a garden can plunge a family into conflict. They believe that the hands of a human beast will smoke when he slays a victim, and that this will cause him shame when a young maiden takes up residence in his home. They believe a thousand other simple things.

I ask of you a little of this childlike sympathy and, to bring us luck, let me speak four truly magic words, childhood's "Open Sesame":

Once upon a time...

=== Filming ===
The set designs and cinematography were intended to evoke the illustrations and engravings of Gustave Doré and, in the farmhouse scenes, the paintings of Jan Vermeer. The cinematography was performed by Henri Alekan. Christian Bérard (theatre artist) and Lucien Carré covered production design.

The flamboyant costumes in the film were made from fabric scraps due to the limited supply in the Aftermath of World War II.

The stone carving of moving faces on the wall was created by covering children’s faces in plaster. The candles at the Beast’s castle had the illusion that they lit themselves, but this was achieved by getting the actor to walk backwards, blowing the candles out, and running the film in reverse.

=== Soundtrack ===
The score was composed by Georges Auric.

=== Filming locations ===
The outdoor locations were primarily filmed

- At Oise
  - The Château de Raray
- At Val-d'Oise
  - At the Royaumont Abbey
- At Indre-et-Loire
  - The Moulin de Touvoie in Rochecorbon is Belle's home.
  - Parçay-Meslay
- At the Alpes-Maritimes
  - Èze

The scenes filmed in a studio were shot

- At the Franstudio Studio in Saint-Maurice, in the Val-de-Marne
- At the Eclair Studio in Épinay-sur-Seine
- At Joinville Studios in Joinville-le-Pont

=== The Beast's makeup ===
At first, Jean Marais wanted to use a deer head, but decided against it, because in La Chatte blanche, the magical castle has a deer head as its door knocker. He also thought it would be linked to the myth of the Celtic god Cernunnos, the horned god. In addition, Jean Cocteau thought that the audience would think that the head of a deer would be ridiculous for a dangerous, ferocious beast. Allegedly, they got Jean Marais's Alaskan Husky, Moulouk, to be the model of the beast's face, though the character more strongly resembles a cat, reflecting Cocteau's own love for the animal.

The beast's makeup and prostheses took a long time to apply, taking about three hours to attach the beast's mask and one hour for each claw. The teeth would be hooked into the actor's mouth, which was not very practical for eating. This caused the actor to eat mainly soup.

In Vincent Pinel's Century of Cinema, he writes (page 207), "With the complexity of the set designer Christian Bérard, the cinematographer Henri Alekan, and his "technical director" René Clément, Jean Cocteau filmed Beauty and the Beast (1946). The impressive makeup of Jean Marais, including both hands and claws, took long hours to apply." Cocteau says, in his film journal, how the close-up shots of the beast resemble a deer. "Clément, hiding behind the beast, moves the beast's ears with a stick to make them stand up. The effect is amazing."

== Home Media ==
The film was released on Blu-ray and DVD by the Criterion Collection with special features, including an alternate soundtrack, audio commentaries, and multiple trailers. The Criterion Collection released it on DVD on 3 June 1998, then the Criterion Collection released it again on DVD on 11 February 2003. The Criterion Collection released it a third time, this time on Blu-ray disc, on 19 July 2011.

== Reception in the U.S. ==
Upon the film's December 1947 New York City release, critic Bosley Crowther called the film a "priceless fabric of subtle images...a fabric of gorgeous visual metaphors, of undulating movements and rhythmic pace, of hypnotic sounds and music, of casually congealing ideas"; according to Crowther, "the dialogue, in French, is spare and simple, with the story largely told in pantomime, and the music of Georges Auric accompanies the dreamy, fitful moods. The settings are likewise expressive, many of the exteriors having been filmed for rare architectural vignettes at Raray, one of the most beautiful palaces and parks in all France. And the costumes, too, by Christian Bérard and Escoffier, are exquisite affairs, glittering and imaginative." According to Time magazine, the film is a "wondrous spectacle for children of any language, and quite a treat for their parents, too"; but the magazine concludes "Cocteau makes about a half-hour too much of a good thing—and few things pall like a dream that cannot be shaken off."

In 1999 Chicago Sun-Times critic Roger Ebert added the film to his The Great Movies list, calling it "one of the most magical of all films" and a "fantasy alive with trick shots and astonishing effects, giving us a Beast who is lonely like a man and misunderstood like an animal." A 2002 Village Voice review found the film's "visual opulence" "both appealing and problematic", writing "Full of baroque interiors, elegant costumes, and overwrought jewelry (even tears turn to diamonds), the film is all surface, and undermines its own don't-trust-a-pretty-face and anti-greed themes at every turn." In 2010, the film was ranked #26 in Empire magazine's "100 Best Films of World Cinema".

== Adaptations and homages ==
- Jacques Demy's 1970 film Donkey Skin is a musical farce adapted from Charles Perrault's incestuous fairy tale about a widowed king who wishes to marry his beautiful daughter. Demy pays homage to Cocteau in numerous references to Beauty and the Beast, including the casting of actor Jean Marais as the king. At one point, the king woos the princess by reading from Cocteau's poem, "Ode à Picasso."
- American singer-songwriter Stevie Nicks wrote her 1983 ballad "Beauty and the Beast" after screening the film for the second time. While she performs the song, the film plays on the screen behind her and the band.
- The fourteenth episode of Faerie Tale Theatre, broadcast in August 1984, featured an adaptation of Beauty And The Beast which was an homage to this film. It borrowed many visual elements, including the makeup for the beast, along with segments of the dialogue translated from French into English. It featured Susan Sarandon as Belle and Klaus Kinski as the Beast.
- Disney's adaptation of Beauty and the Beast (1991 film) featured many visual tributes to Cocteau's version, most notably the idea of living furniture.
- In 1994, composer Philip Glass created an opera version — also called La Belle et la Bête — one of a "Cocteau Trilogy" of operas. In its initial incarnation the musicians and singers would perform the work on stage with a restored, newly subtitled print of the film playing on a screen behind them. In the original presentation, Belle was sung by the mezzo-soprano Janice Felty. (The current Criterion Collection Blu-ray release offers the ability to view the movie while listening to either Glass's score or the original soundtrack.)
- The 2003 American miniseries Angels in America features a dream sequence which duplicates the set design of the Beast's castle. A character is shown reading a book about Cocteau before the dream begins.
- The Vienna Art Orchestra's 1995 production "The Vienna Art Orchestra plays for Jean Cocteau" was performed with a showing of the film, and uses its text.

== Awards ==
- Won the Prix Louis Dullec in 1946
- Nominated for Grand Prize of the Festival for the 1946 Cannes Film Festival
- Best Actor nominee for Jean Marais for the Bambi Awards in 1948
- Listed as part of the British Film Institute's list of Top 50 films you should see by the age of 14.

== See also ==
- List of cult films
