= Nikos Kazantzakis (disambiguation) =

Nikos Kazantzakis (Νίκος Καζαντζάκης) may refer to:

- Nikos Kazantzakis (1883–1957), Greek writer
- Nikos Kazantzakis (municipality), former municipality in the Heraklion regional unit, Crete, Greece
- Heraklion International Airport "Nikos Kazantzakis" (IATA: HER, ICAO: LGIR), primary airport on the island of Crete, Greece
