= Endo Shusaku Literary Museum =

Mosque in Nagasaki, Japan

Coordinates: 32°50′9″N 129°42′10″E

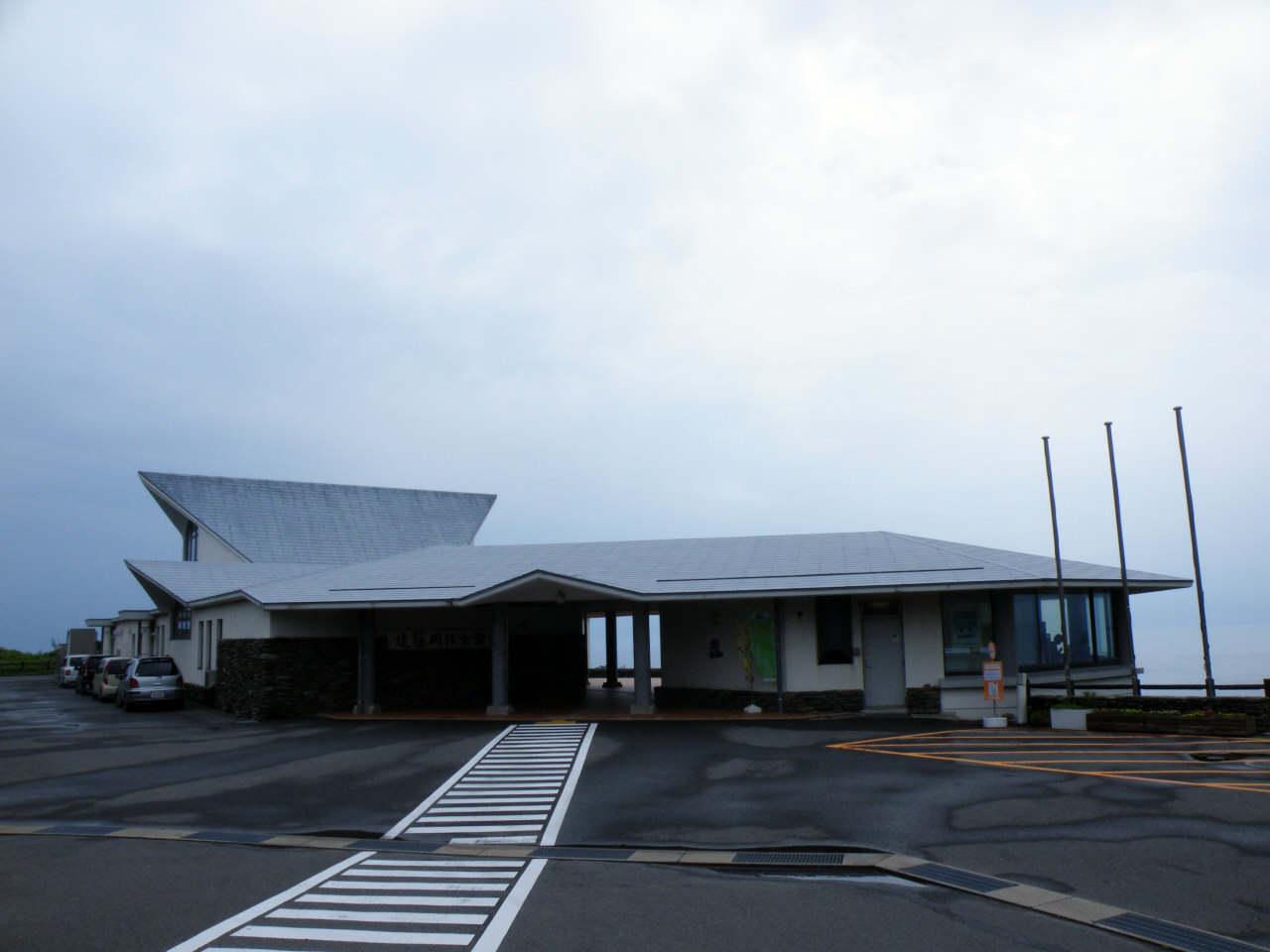
Exterior of the museum

The Endo Shusaku Literary Museum (遠藤周作文学館, Endō Shūsaku Bungaku-kan) is a museum dedicated to the life and work of Japanese novelist Shusaku Endo. It is in the Sotome district in the northwestern part of the city of Nagasaki. Sotome is famed as the home of the hidden Christians and served as the scene for Endo's novel Silence.

Established in May 2000, the museum displays Endo's books, manuscripts, letters, photographs and favourite possessions including his writing desk, his Bible and rosary, and a statue of Mary inherited from his mother and kept at his bedside throughout his life.

The museum looks out over the Gotō Sea and Shitsu Culture Village, where a monument stands to Silence. It is inscribed with the words "Humanity is so sad, Lord, and the ocean so blue."

== Work ==
In January 2022, the museum announced the discovery of three plays written by Endo, adding to his existing seven.
