= Stratis Tsirkas =

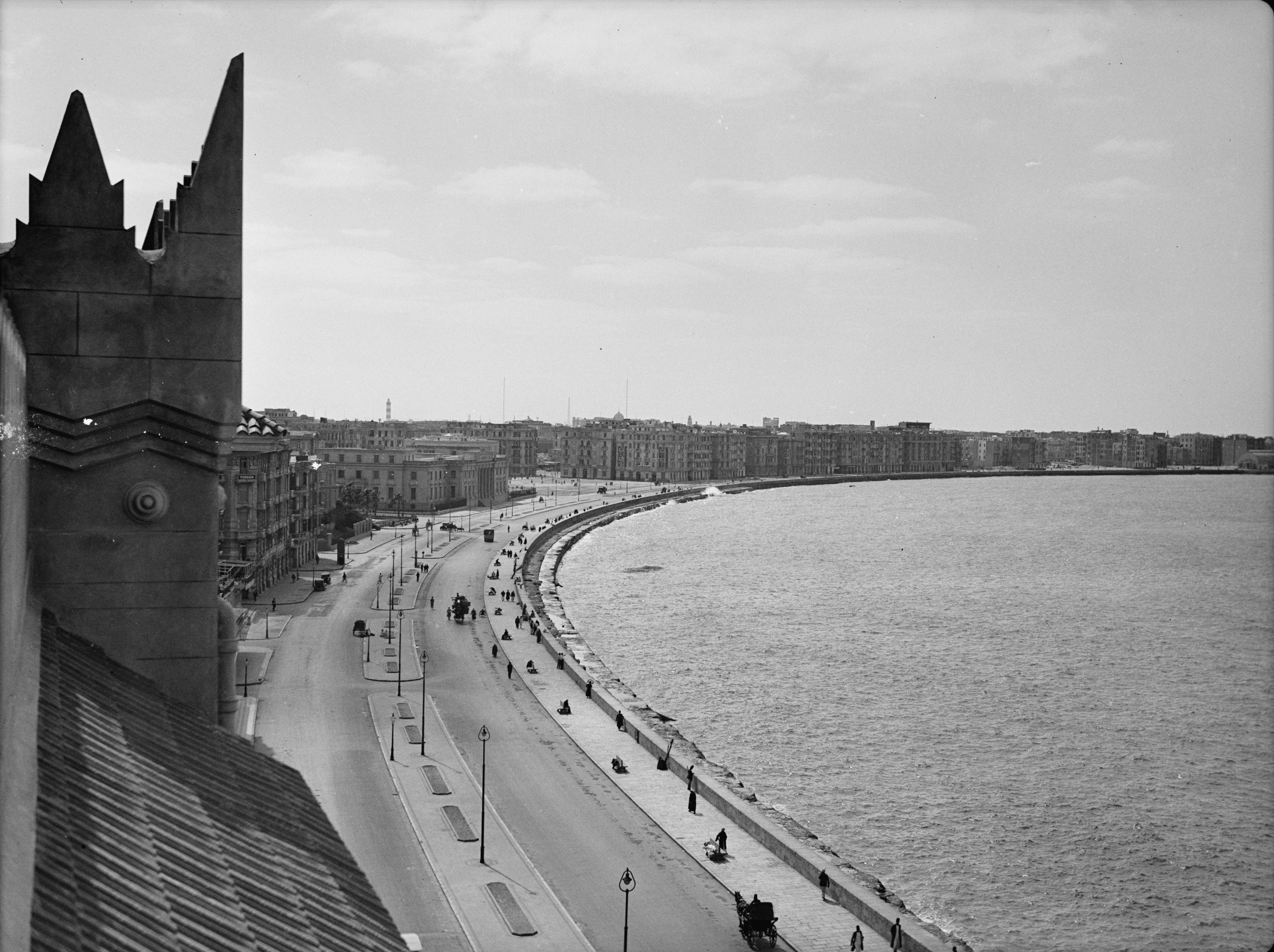
The Corniche of Alexandria, Egypt in the 1930s, along the Mediterranean coast

Yiannis Hatziandreas (July 23, 1911 – January 27, 1980), better known by his pen name, Stratis Tsirkas, was a Modern Greek poet, novelist, literary critic, and translator who was born and grew up in Cairo, Egypt as a member of Egypt's Greek community. In 1938, he moved to the culturally mixed and cosmopolitan society of Alexandria, on Egypt's Mediterranean coast, where he managed a factory and became active in the city's vibrant literary scene. There he befriended the eminent Egypt-born Greek poet Constantine P. Cavafy, whom he had first met in 1930, and about whom he later wrote two books. Tsirkas received most acclaim for his trilogy of novels called Drifting Cities. Set in Alexandria, Cairo, and Jerusalem during World War II, Drifting Cities has appeared in many translations, including Arabic, English, French, Italian, Romanian, Spanish, Turkish, and German. Active in left-wing politics, Tsirkas belonged to the Communist Party until its leaders expelled him for critically portraying the party's authoritarian culture in The Club, the first volume in his Drifting Cities trilogy, which appeared in Greek in 1961. He emigrated to Greece in 1963 and died in Athens in 1980. Observers have hailed him as a "towering figure in contemporary Greek literature."

== Family, career, and literary production ==
Yiannis Hatziandreas, who later adopted the pen name Stratis Tsirkas, was born in Cairo in 1911 to a poor, second-generation Greek Egyptian family that originally came from the island of Imbros, which is now part of Turkey. His father was a barber, and he himself later worked in his father's barbershop. He attributed his strong connections to Arabs and to Arabic culture, and his affiniites to both Christians and Muslims, to his mother, who had been born to a Greek Orthodox family in Jaffa, now in Israel, during the late Ottoman period; and to his experience growing up in an apartment building in Cairo that included Egyptian Muslim residents as well as Armenians, Italians, and others. The literary critic E.D. Karampetsos noted Tsirkas's sympathetic treatment of and sense of kinship with Arabs in his writings. He conveyed these feelings not only towards fellow Egyptians, but also to Arabs including "Palestinians, Syrians, Sudanese, and Bedouins."

After finishing school Tsirkas worked in the National Bank of Egypt and then for a cotton firm. From 1929 to 1938, the latter job took him to Dayrut, in Upper Egypt, where he became acquainted with the peasants or fellahin as well as with fishermen and laborers. These contacts strengthened his commitment to Marxism and in 1937 inspired his first poetry collection, called Fellahin, which reflected on the oppression of the peasantry. He moved to Alexandria to manage a factory in 1938 and there met Constantine Cavafy, who inspired his work. He published his first collection of short stories, called Strange People, in 1944.

Tsirkas ultimately wrote two books about Constantine Cavafy, whom many Greeks have hailed as the most important Greek poet of the modern era. One of these books, called Cavafy and His Times (1958), won a literary prize for biographical writing from the government of Greece. The other was called The Political Cavafy (1971). In 1994, the Stratis Tsirkas Society of Friends donated some of Tsirkas's materials to the Cavafy museum in Alexandria, Egypt.

Tsirkas's work reflected a strong historical and social consciousness. His Drifting Cities trilogy took place during World War II at a time when the Greek government was exiled in Egypt and left-wing and right-wing forces were battling for control of Greece itself. The original Greek editions appeared in three volumes as The Club (1961), Ariadne (1962), and The Bat (1965). A French translation won a prize in France for the best foreign novel in 1971; a French television adaption debuted in 1984. An English translation of the trilogy appeared as Drifting Cities in 1974.

In the late 1950s, following the Suez Crisis, inspired by the capture of the Suez Canal by the Free Officers, and by the leadership of Gamal Abdel Nasser, he wrote a long short story or novella called The Nureddin Bomb. He started working on a new trilogy before his death in 1980.

== Legacy, impact, and continuing recognition ==
At a two-day symposium held in the Cypriot towns of Nicosia and Limassol in 2010 to mark the hundredth anniversary of the author's birth – an event opened by leaders from the government of Cyprus as well as by diplomats from Greece – critics hailed Stratis Tsirkas as "perhaps the most important postwar prose writer" of modern Greek. Actors performed a stage adaptation of his short story or novella "Nurredin Bomb". In 2017, the two most important historic theatres of Athens, the National Theatre of Greece and the Art Theatre, staged an adaptation of Drifting Cities. In 2020, Gretchen McCullough writing in the Los Angeles Review of Books recognized Drifting Cities as "an engaging, panoramic work that captures the complex fabric of the Greek diaspora and the uprisings in the Greek Armed Forces of the Middle East" during World War II. Historians and literary scholars have continued to analyze Stratis Tsirkas's works for insights into modern Egyptian and Greek history, and into literary culture and cosmopolitanism in early twentieth-century Cairo and Alexandria and among intellectuals of the Greek diaspora.

Many have compared his works, in terms of their settings and themes, to those of the British novelists Olivia Manning (whose Fortunes of War series of six novels also covered World War II affairs in the eastern Mediterranean world), Lawrence Durrell (who also frequented the Alexandria literary scene), and E.M. Forster (who was a mutual friend of Constantine Cavafy) He belongs to a larger cohort of literati including Edwar al-Kharrat (who wrote in Arabic), Yitzhak Gormezano Goren (who emigrated to Israel and writes in Hebrew), and Ibrahim Abdel Meguid (who writes in Arabic), all three of whom produced novels centered on Alexandrian society.
