= Osamu Dazai Memorial Museum =

Writer's home museum in Aomori Prefecture, Japan

- 太宰治記念館
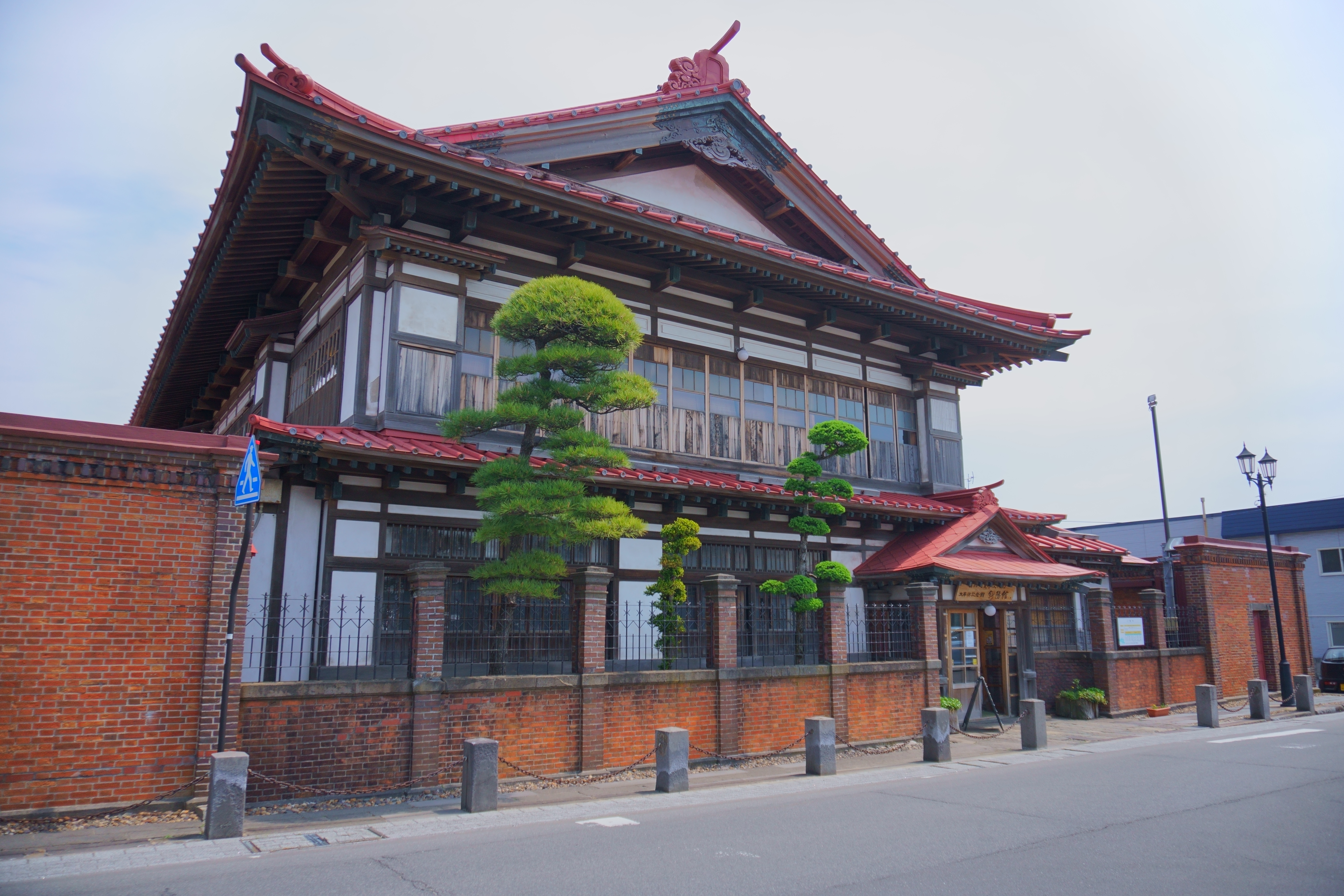
- Osamu Dazai Memorial Museum (May 2022)

- Location within Aomori Prefecture Location within Japan
- Established: 1998
- Coordinates: 40.9027°N 140.4555°E
- Website: dazai.or.jp/modules/contents/class-a01.html

The Osamu Dazai Memorial Museum (太宰治記念館, Dazai Osamu Kinenkan), also commonly referred to as Shayōkan (斜陽館) (transl. Setting Sun Manor), is a writer's home museum located in the Kanagi area of Goshogawara in Aomori Prefecture, Japan. It is dedicated to the late author Osamu Dazai, who spent some of his early childhood in Kanagi, and houses antique furniture, ornaments and a collection of Osamu Dazai's works.

== History ==
The building was built in 1907 by Dazai's father, who was a wealthy landowner and member of the Japanese Diet during the Meiji period. Dazai lived in the house from his birth in 1909 until 1923, when he moved to the city of Aomori. Afterward, he returned on a number of occasions, and moved back into the house from 1942 to 1945. After his death in 1948, the house was sold, and was remodeled into a ryokan, with a small private memorial museum to the author. The name Shayōkan was taken from one of Dazai's novels. The inn suffered from deteriorating finances despite its popularity with fans of the author, and it was sold to the town of Kanagi in 1996. After extensive remodeling to restore its original appearance, it was reopened as the Osamu Dazai Memorial Museum in 1998.

The building is a two-story wooden structure, and is made mostly of hiba wood, for which Aomori is famous. There are 11 rooms downstairs and 8 rooms upstairs, plus a number of attached buildings, kura, and a Japanese garden with a spring. Although the appearance of the building is that of a traditional Japanese-style house, it contains a number of Western features, notably in the design of its staircase and the truss structure of the roof.

The building is registered as an Important Cultural Property. It is featured alongside a caricature of Dazai on the postmark for Kanagi.
