= Jean Cocteau House =

Villa in Milly-la-Forêt, France

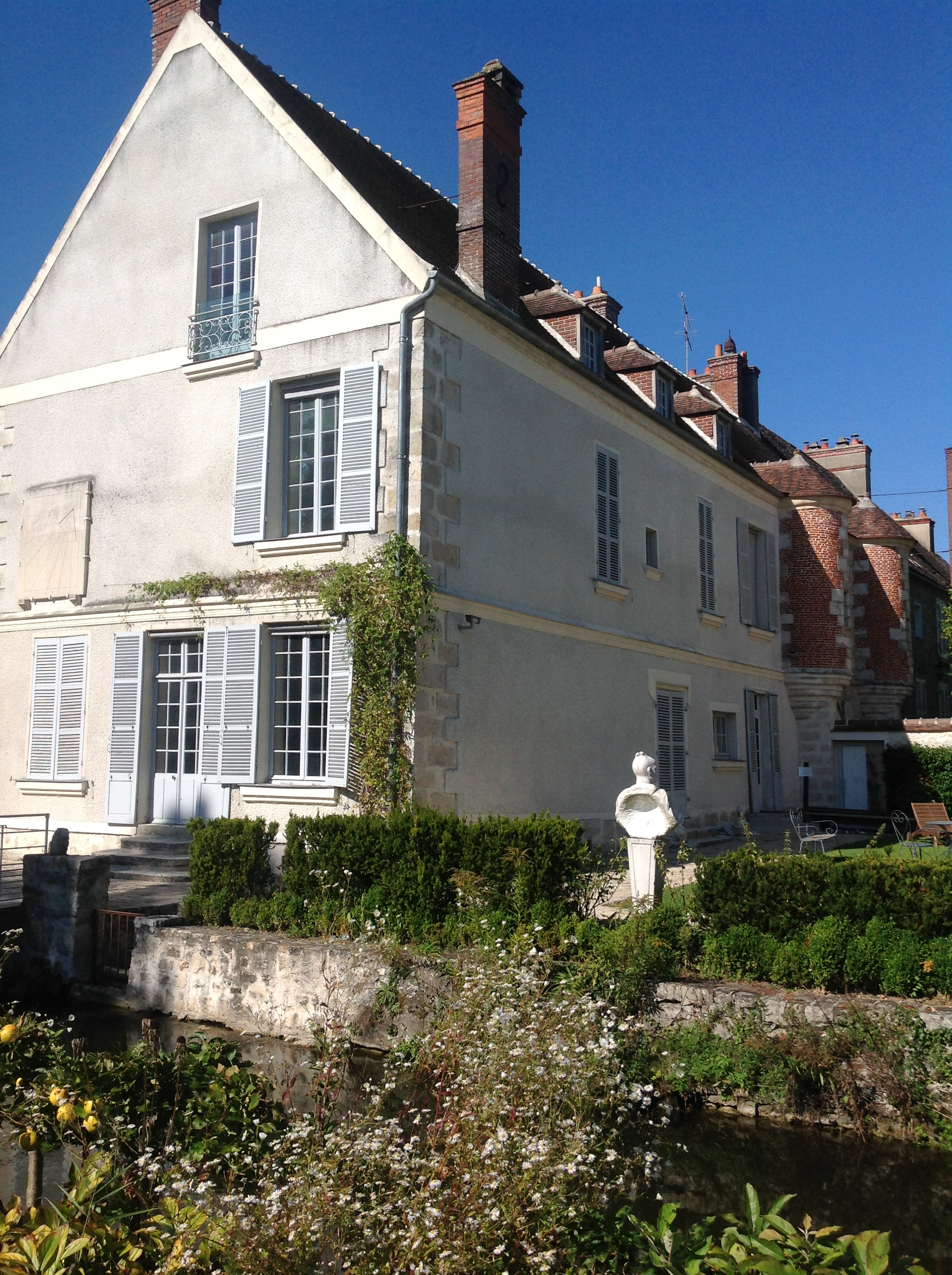
The Jean Cocteau House at Milly-la-Forêt

The Jean Cocteau House was the residence of the French poet, artist, playwright and film maker Jean Cocteau (1889–1963), which he purchased with the film actor Jean Marais in 1947, and where he created many of his later works before his death in 1963. It is located about fifty kilometers south of Paris in the village of Milly-la-Forêt in the Essonne Department of France. The 16th century house was originally part of the domain of a 13th-century chateau whose moat and a ruined tower are next to the house. The house also has gardens and a small wooded park. The house now displays furnished rooms and a museum of his work. The tomb of Cocteau, decorated with his work, is found in a small chapel, Saint Blaise des Simples, at the edge of town not from the house. The house facade and roof were listed in the supplemental inventory of historic monuments in 1969.

== History ==
The house was originally constructed during the reign of Henry IV of France and a clerical residence, with twelve rooms, adjacent to the Chateau of Milly-la-Forêt. The house adjoins the walls and moat of the 13th century chateau. In 1947, at a time when his fame and fortune had been greatly increased by the enormous success of his film Beauty and The Beast, Cocteau and his frequent companion of the time, the film actor Jean Marais, purchased part of the domain of the chateau, including the house, garden and part of the woods, and used it as a retreat from his residence on Rue Montpensier in Paris. Cocteau stayed there on occasion during his early years of ownership, but when he entered a relationship with Édouard Dermit he stayed there for longer periods of time, and created many of his later works there.

Cocteau died on October 11, 1963, at the age of 73 years, and was buried in the Chapel of Saint-Blaise-des Simples nearby, which he had decorated. Dermit inherited the house and the works of art it contained and kept them until his own death in 1995, after which his son Stéphane became owner of the house. In 2002 the businessman and philanthropist Pierre Bergé purchased the house, with the assistance of the Regional Council of the Essonne and the French Ministry of Culture, and began an extensive campaign of restoration between 2005 and 2010. The house was opened to the public by the French Minister of Culture, Frédéric Mitterrand, on June 24, 2010.

== The house ==
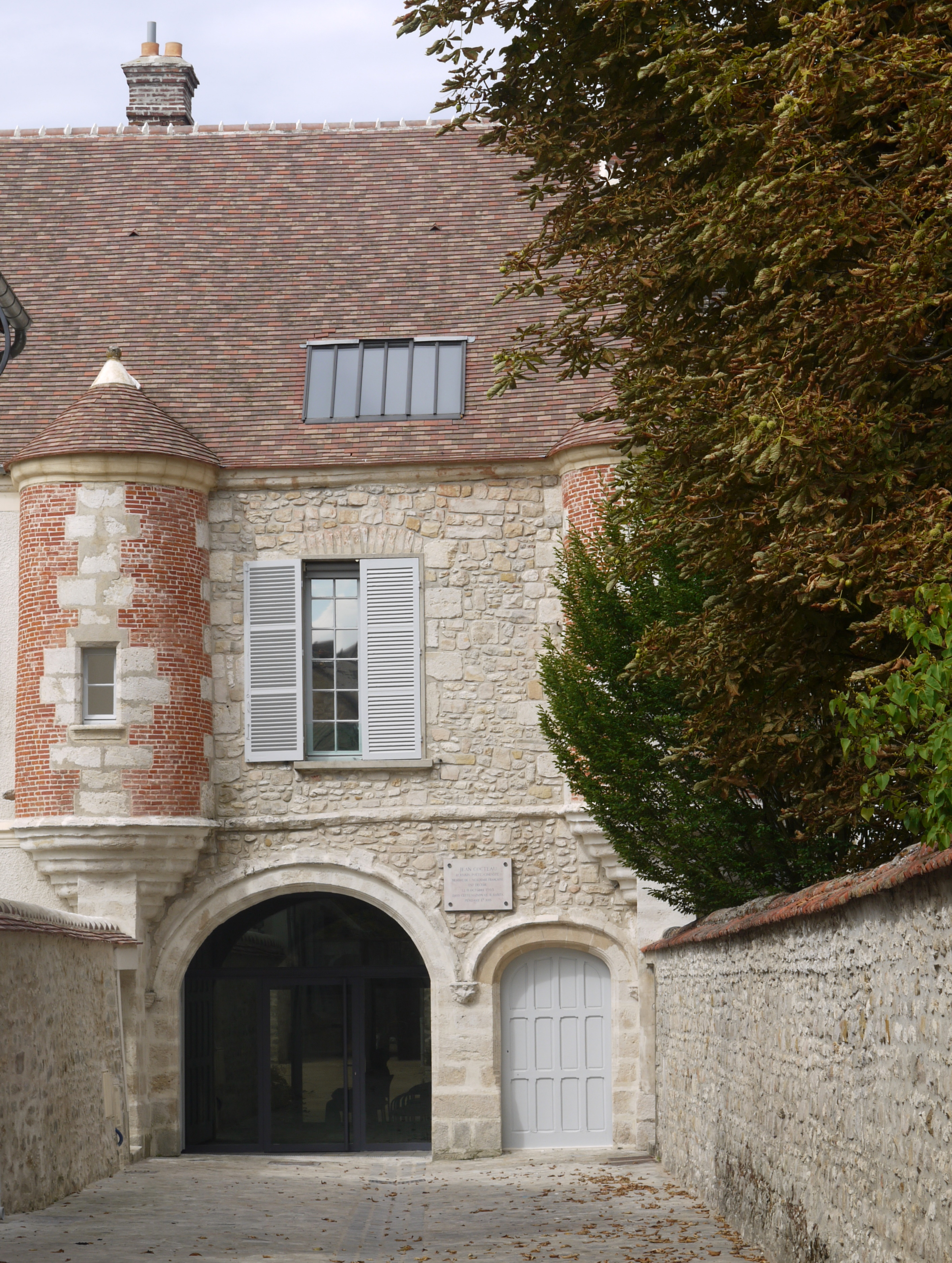
17th-century entrance of The Jean Cocteau House

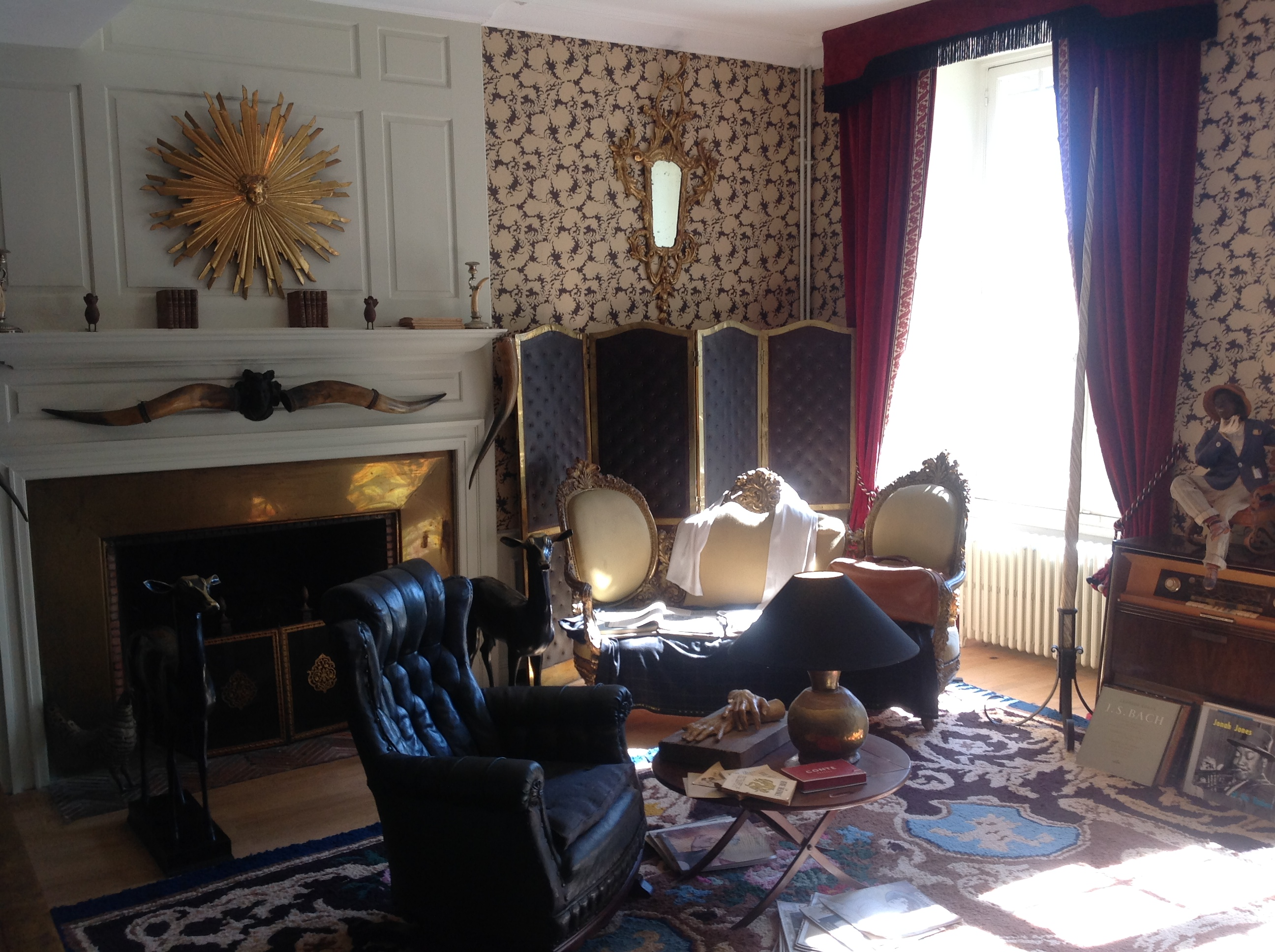
The Grand Salon

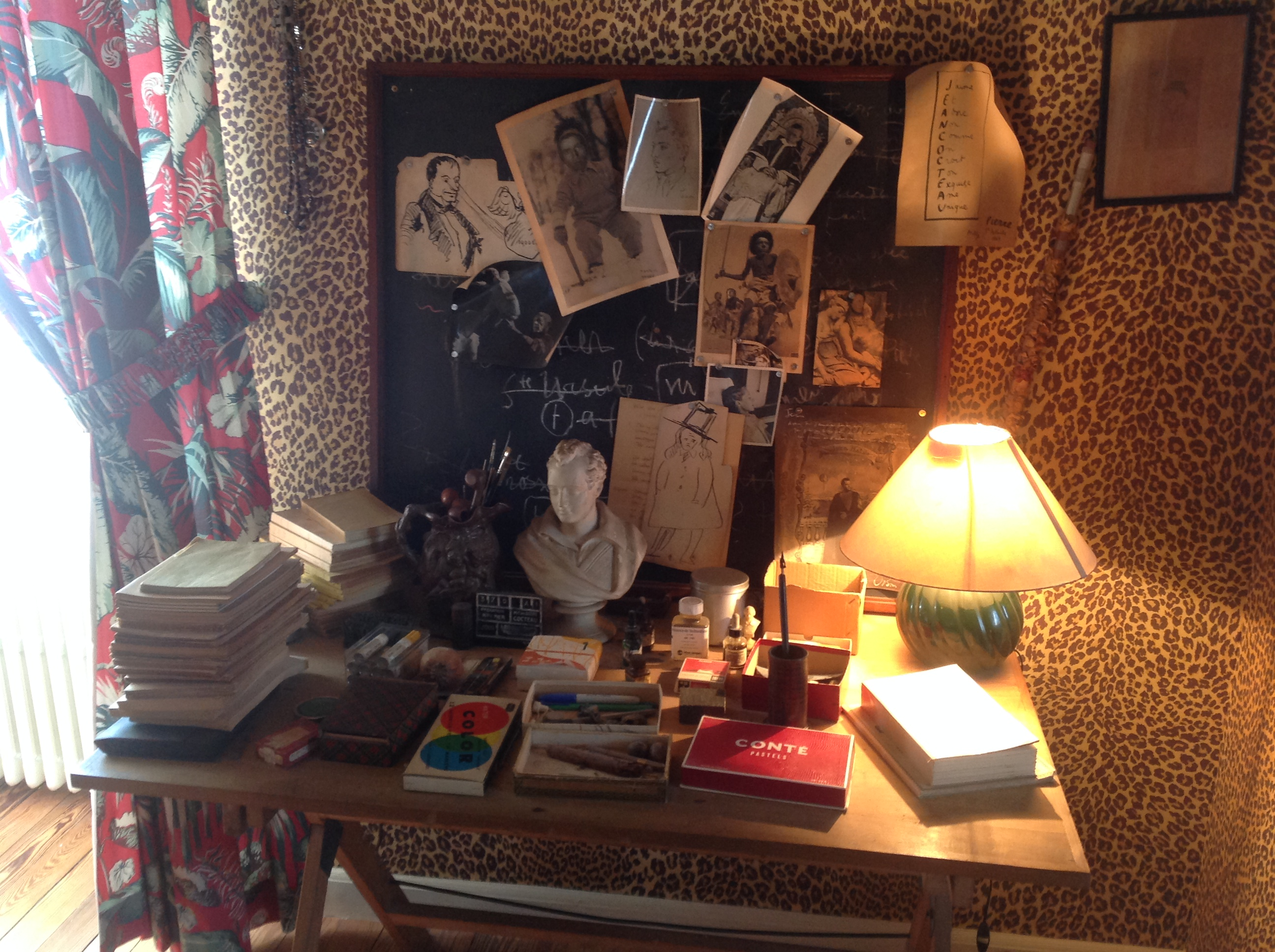
Cocteau's side table in his study, with a bust of Lord Byron

The rooms of the house have been recreated as they appeared during Cocteau's residence, with his collections of art works, furniture and souvenirs.

In his study on the first floor, his writing table faced the window, and he sat in a 19th-century gothic revival cathedral chair. The side table and wall are covered with photographs, drawings, and various souvenirs, among them a bust of Lord Byron, a signed photograph of Orson Welles as Othello, a photograph of Pablo Picasso, a drawing of Charles Baudelaire by Manet, and a photo montage of Jean-Paul Sartre and Pope Pius XI. Over the mantlepiece in the study is a high-relief art work of a hot-air balloon caught in a storm, by G. Lapruffe, on the mantlepiece are small works of antique Roman sculpture, and on the wall hangs a portrait of a young woman by the French painter Amoury-Duval (1867).

== The museum ==
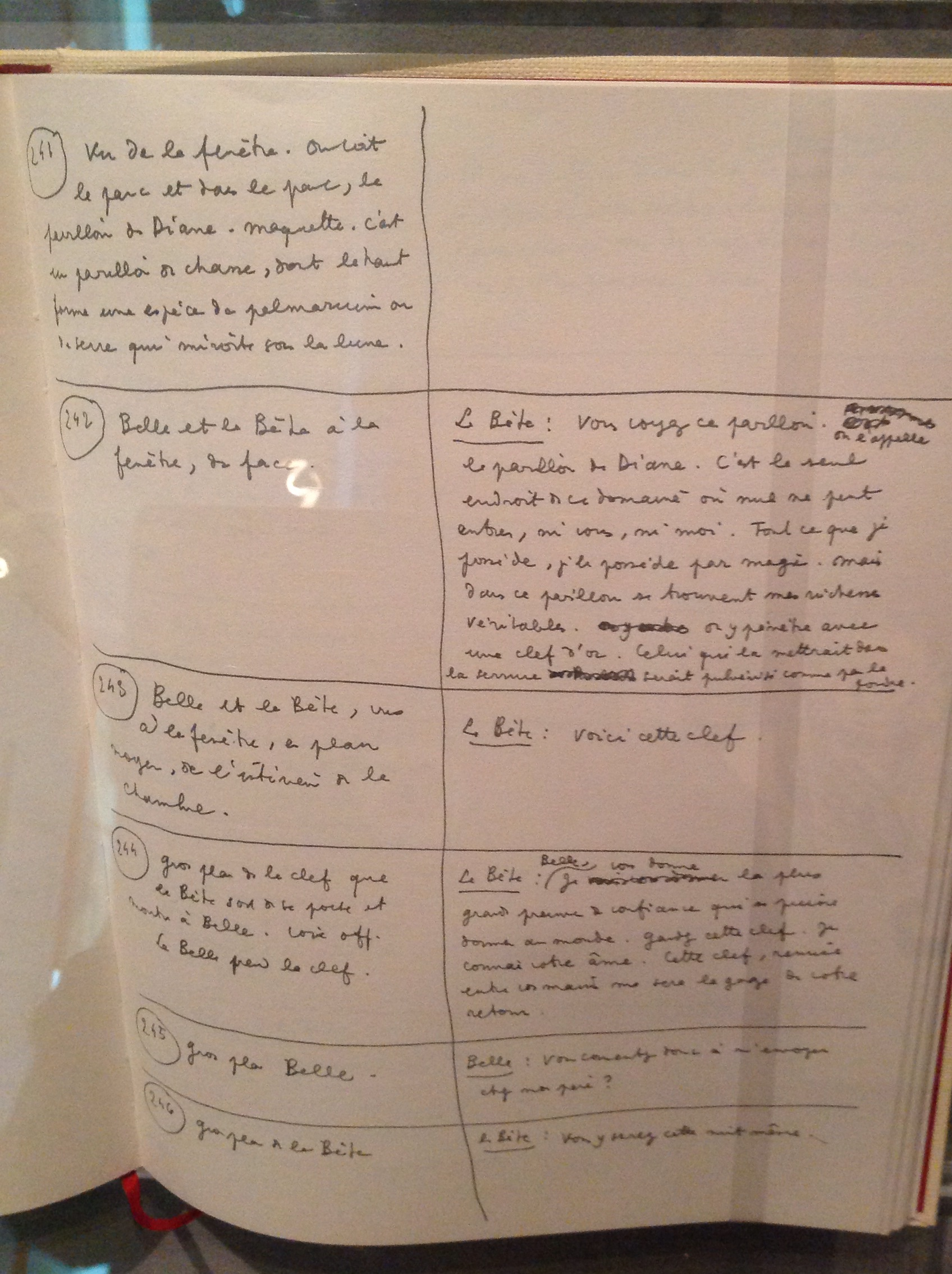
A handwritten page of the Beauty and the Beast scenario by Cocteau (1946)

In the hallways of the first floor are displayed paintings, graphics and posters by or about Cocteau's. They include a page from the original hand-written script of his 1946 film Beauty and the Beast and a poster from his film Orpheus.

== The Chapel of Saint-Blaise-des-Simples ==
The Chapel of Saint-Blaise-des-Simples, where the tomb of Cocteau is located, is at the edge of Milly-la-Foret, not far from the house. It was originally constructed in the 12th century, and is the last vestige of a medieval maladrerie, a hospital constructed especially for those suffering from leprosy. Beginning in 1959, Cocteau decorated the chapel on the theme of simples, or medicinal plants, with murals of a Christ with a crown of thorns and of medicinal herbs including mint, belladonna and buttercups. His tomb is inscribed with the words "Je reste avec vous'" ("I remain with you").

== Bibliography ==
- Le Guide du Patrimoine en France, Editions du Patrimoine, Centre des Monuments Nationaux (2002), ISBN 978-2-85822-760-0
- Sanson, Marie, Maison Jean Cocteau, Somogy éditions d'art, (2010), (in French) ISBN 978-2-7572-0390-3
