= Myrtia, Heraklion =

Myrtia Μυρτιά
- Community
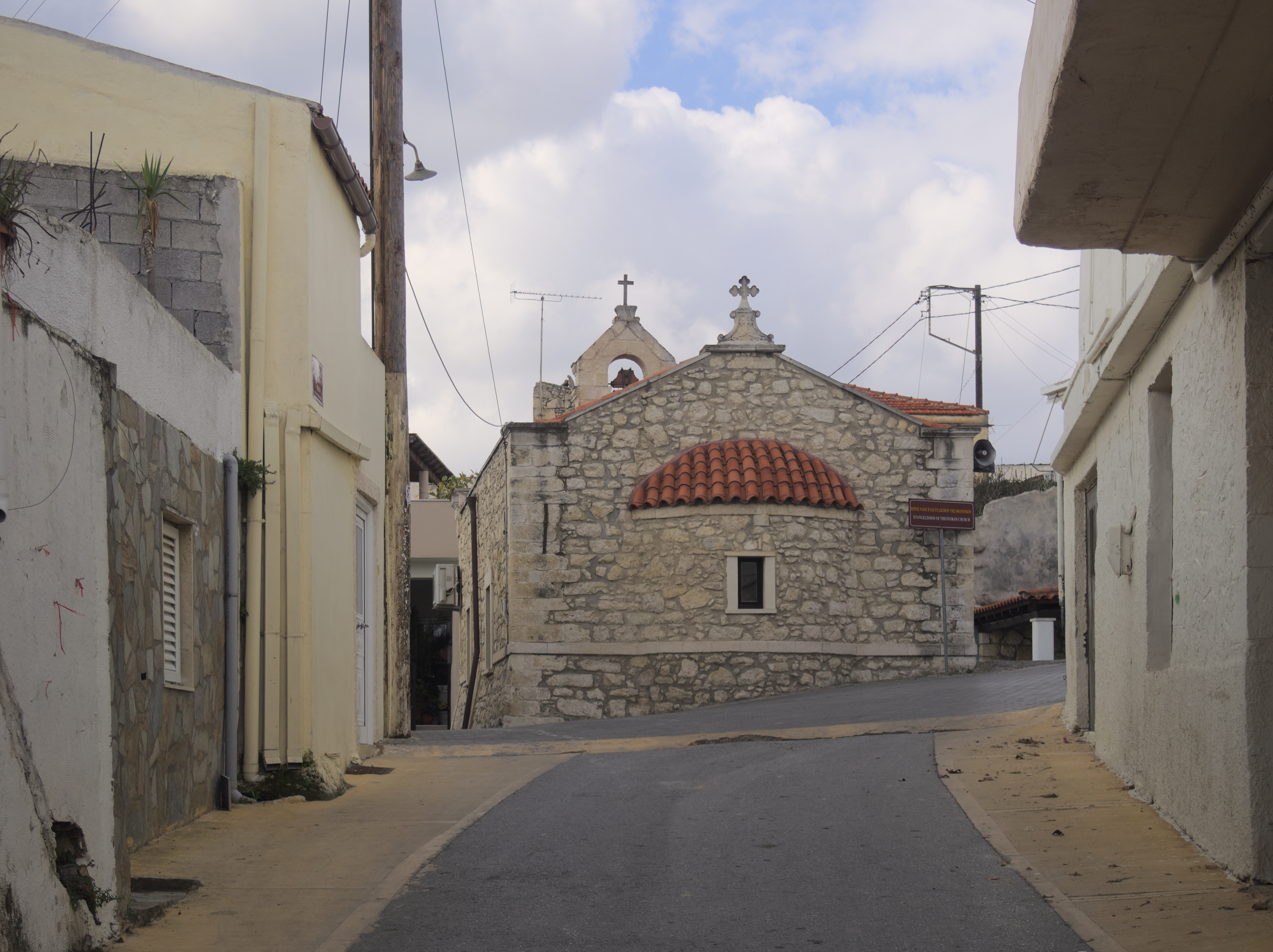
- The church of Evangelismos of Theotokos

- Location within Greece
- Coordinates: 35°14′06″N 25°12′36″E
- Country: Greece
- Administrative region: Crete
- Regional unit: Heraklion
- Municipality: Heraklion
- Municipal unit: Nikos Kazantzakis

Population (2021)
  - Community: 502
- Time zone: UTC+2 (EET)
  - Summer (DST): UTC+3 (EEST)

Myrtia (Greek: Μυρτιά, before 1965: Βάρβαροι - Varvaroi) is a village in the northern part of the municipal unit Nikos Kazantzakis, Crete, Greece. It is 15 km from Heraklion. It is situated at an altitude of 365 meters from the sea. It borders with the municipal unit of Episkopi and the municipality of Heraklion, and the villages Astrakoi and Agies Paraskies. It has a population of 502 inhabitants, according to the 2021 census.

The jewel of the village is the Nikos Kazantzakis Museum which was founded by designer George Anemogiannis (el) and the Centre of Cretan Literature, founded by the municipality in cooperation with the University of Crete and Cretan Philologists.
