= Picture Book Museum =

Coordinates: 36°58′25.4″N 140°57′59.1″E

The Museum of Picture Books, also known as the Picture Book Library, is located in Iwaki City, Fukushima Prefecture in Japan. In 2005, Japanese architect Tadao Ando designed this privately owned special library mainly to serve three preschools. However, visitors flock to the library on its open-access days to see Ando’s design and to enjoy the collection of international children’s books.

== Building ==
The building occupies 492.07 m^{2} of space, with the total floorspace amounting to 634.05 m² in Ando's building. Decorations are minimal, largely consisting of the books themselves in a cover-out display that dominates the space.

The only three materials used in the building are fair-faced reinforced concrete, glass, and wood. Though some may consider concrete a sterile or bland material, Ando sees it as warm and complex. He states, “Concrete can be very rich in color … the gradations of color create a sense of depth”.

The simplicity of color is noted by some reviewers who mention the fact that the Western notion of child-friendly decor is less stark and angular. In the Picture Book Library the only color is supplied by the bright patterns of the books themselves. The corridors are kept deliberately dark, in defiance of a possible Western preference for evenly light-filled spaces. “You will be able to see the light because of the darkness,” says Ando.

== Critical response ==
A total of 6000 people visited the Picture Book Library in its first 10 months, often 200 on each public day and visitors have exclaimed of the building: “The museum is "architecture of light...the concrete feels so warm". Critics say "a tension-rich rhythm develops out brightly and darkly, from open and closed zones". "Like so many of his greatest buildings, it pulls off a remarkable illusion: the walls may be built from blocks of concrete, but, from the inside at least, the building feels as if its primary materials were light and air". "There is no dead end,” one blogger noted, and they were reminded of M. C. Escher. A group of students raved it "is spectacular, offering views across the Pacific Ocean from anywhere on the premises...This space is fun even for adults".

== Collection and users ==
The collection is international in scope and contains only picture books aimed at young children. There are 1300 books in the collection, which was privately compiled before being shared in the library. Authors featured in the collection include Maurice Sendak, Marie Hall Ets, Edward Gorey, and Kate Greenaway.

The Picture Book Library was conceived in 2003 to serve the Iwaki, White Rose, and Alice Preschools. The preschools use the building Mondays through Thursdays. The public can enjoy the building by submitting a written request and receiving a date-specific invitation: "いわき市平豊間字合磯209-42 ※来館希望の方は往復ハガキで、 〒970-8031 平中山字矢ノ倉131-4 学校法人 いわき幼稚園 まで申込みを。". Fridays are the public-access days. Entrance is free. Visitors can arrive on foot, by car or via bus.
