= Walt Whitman House =

Last residence of poet Walt Whitman

- U.S. National Register of Historic Places
- U.S. National Historic Landmark
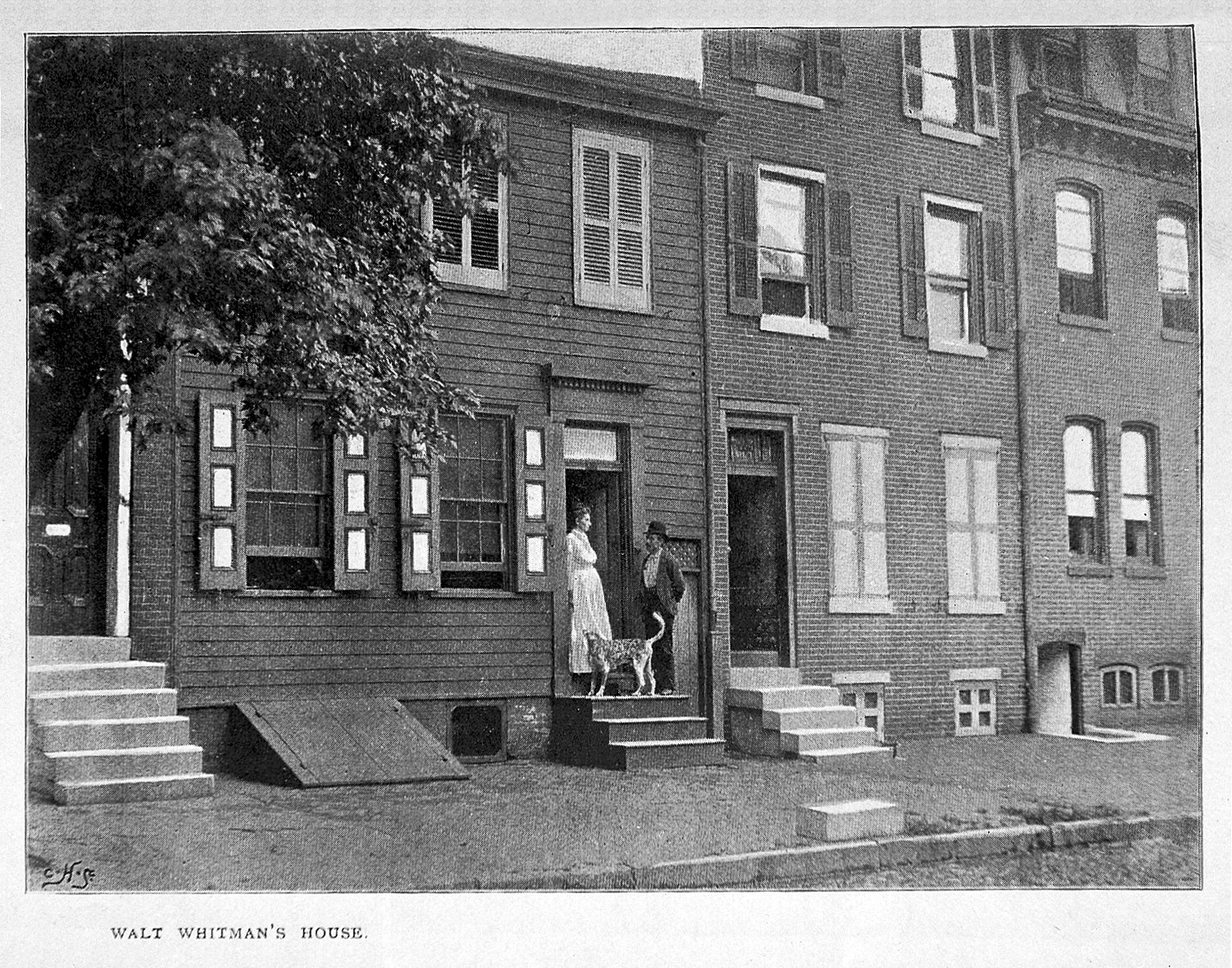
- Walt Whitman House in Camden, New Jersey

- Location within Camden County, New Jersey Location within New Jersey Location within the United States
- Location: Camden, New Jersey
- Coordinates: 39°56′33″N 75°7′26″W
- Built: circa 1848
- NRHP reference No.: 66000461

Significant dates
- Added to NRHP: October 15, 1966
- Designated NHL: December 29, 1962

The Walt Whitman House is a historic building in Camden, New Jersey, United States, which was the last residence of American poet Walt Whitman, in his declining years before his death. It is located at 330 Dr. Martin Luther King Jr. Boulevard, known as Mickle St. during Whitman's time there.

== History ==
In 1873, Whitman suffered a paralytic stroke and, in May the same year, his mother Louisa Whitman died; both events left him depressed. Louisa was in Camden, New Jersey at the time and Whitman arrived three days before her death. He returned to Washington, D. C., where he had been living, only briefly before returning to Camden to live with his brother George, paying room and board. The brothers lived on Stevens Street and Walt lived there for the next eleven years. Whitman spent the Christmas of 1883 with friends in Germantown, Pennsylvania while his brother was building a farmhouse in Burlington, New Jersey that included accommodations for the poet. Instead of moving with his brother, however, Whitman purchased the Mickle Street House in Camden in the spring of 1884. He was 65, and it was the first home he owned. Whitman called it his "shanty" or "coop", emphasizing its shabbiness. His brother George did not approve of the purchase and the decision strained their relationship. Others questioned Whitman's judgment as well. A friend called it "the worst house and the worst situated". Another friend noted it "was the last place one would expect a poet to select for a home."

The lot on which the home was standing was purchased in 1847 by a clerk named Adam Hare for $350. It was likely Hare who built the house. By the time Whitman bought it, it was a two-story row house with six rooms and no furnace. Its recent occupant was Alfred Lay, the grandfather of a young friend of Whitman. When Lay couldn't pay the rent for March, Whitman loaned him the $16 he needed. Whitman soon after purchased the home for $1,750, which he earned from recent sales of a recent edition of Leaves of Grass and through a loan from publisher George William Childs. Lay continued to live there with his wife, cooking to cover part of their rent and paying $2 a week; the Lays moved out on January 20, 1885. Whitman later invited Mary Davis, a sailor's widow living a few blocks away, to serve as his housekeeper in exchange for free rent in the house. She moved in on February 24, 1885, bringing with her a cat, a dog, two turtledoves, a canary, and other assorted animals.

During a yearlong tour of the United States in 1882, Oscar Wilde visited Whitman at this home. The two writers shared elderberry wine and Wilde later reflected, "There is no one in this great wide world of America whom I love and honor so much". Another international visitor, an admirer named John Johnston, described meeting Whitman on a hot summer day in 1890, sitting cross-legged on a large rocking chair with his shirt open and sleeves rolled up above his elbows.

While living in the home, Whitman completed several poems, many focused on public events. One was a sonnet published in the February 22, 1885, issue of the Philadelphia Press called "Ah, Not This Granite Dead and Cold" which commemorated the completion of the Washington Monument. Some of Whitman's writing was done in his bedroom, which visitors noted was similar to a newspaper office, piled with stacks of paper. In this home, he also prepared an anthology of essays and articles November Boughs.

During his years in the house, however, Whitman only earned an estimated $1,300, of which only $20 came from royalties from Leaves of Grass and about $350 came from new works. The majority of his earnings were donations from admirers and well-wishers.

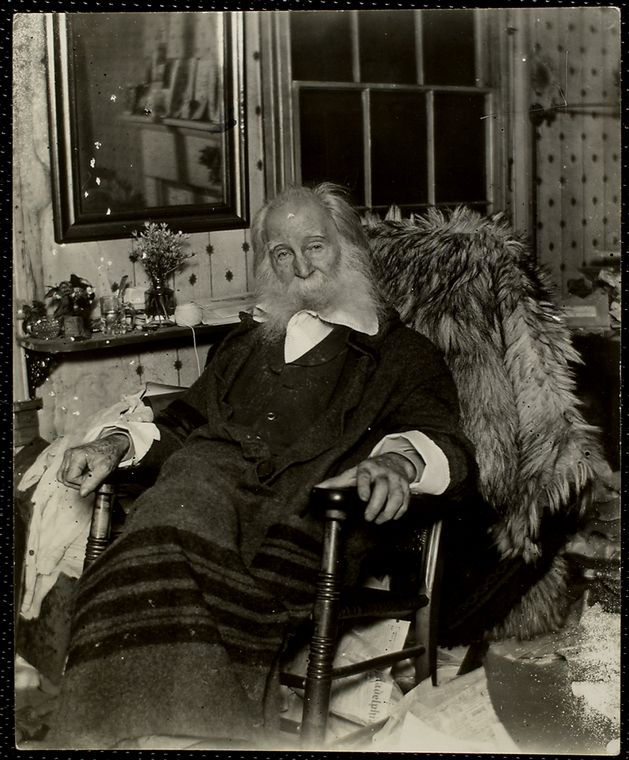
Walt Whitman in his Mickle Street home the year before his death

Whitman's health had been failing since before he moved into the home, worsened by another stroke he suffered in 1888, and he began making preparations for his death. For $4,000, he commissioned a granite house-shaped mausoleum which he visited often during its construction. In the last week of his life, too weak to lift a knife or fork, he wrote: "I suffer all the time: I have no relief, no escape: it is monotony — monotony — monotony — in pain." He spent his last years preparing a final edition of Leaves of Grass. At the end of 1891, he wrote to a friend: "L. of G. at last complete—after 33 y'rs of hackling at it, all times & moods of my life, fair weather & foul, all parts of the land, and peace & war, young & old". In January 1892, an announcement was published in the New York Herald in which Whitman asked that "this new 1892 edition... absolutely supersede all previous ones. Faulty as it is, he decides it as by far his special and entire self-chosen poetic utterance." The final edition of Leaves of Grass was published in 1892 and is referred to as the "deathbed edition".

Whitman died at 6:43 p.m. on March 26, 1892, a few days before his 73rd birthday. His autopsy was performed at the home and revealed that the left lung had collapsed and the right was at one-eighth its breathing capacity. A public viewing of Whitman's body was also held at the Camden home; over one thousand people visited in three hours. In his final years, Whitman had noted his appreciation for the house and for Camden. He wrote, "Camden was originally an accident—but I shall never be sorry. I was left over in Camden. It has brought me blessed returns."

== Modern history ==
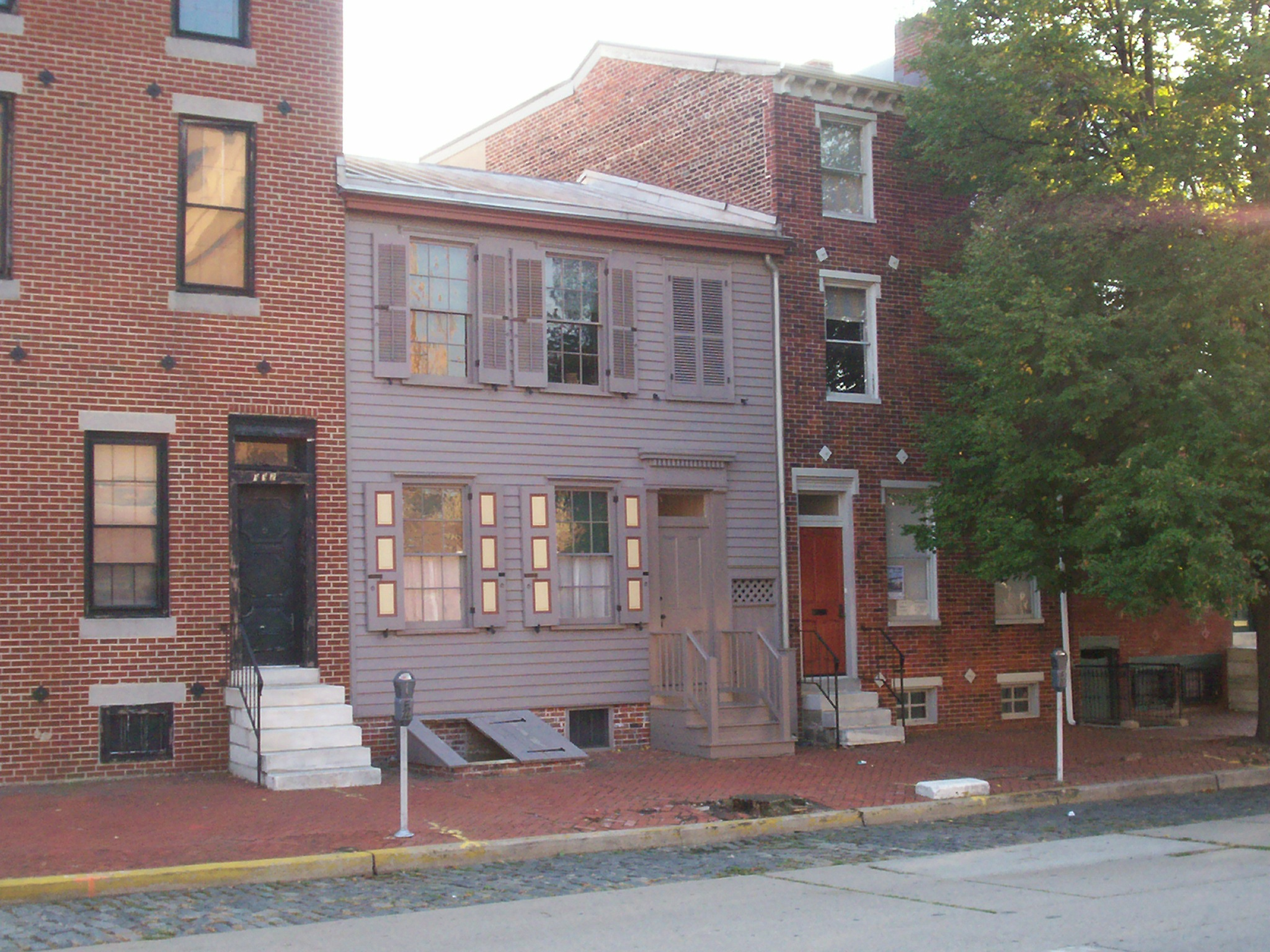
Walt Whitman's house, 2007

After Whitman's death, the majority of the home's contents remained at the house. His heirs sold it to the city of Camden in 1921 and it was opened to the public five years later. In 1947, ownership was passed to the state of New Jersey. The home was listed in the New Jersey Department of Environmental Protection's Historic Preservation Office in 1971 (ID# 934) and the National Register of Historic Places (NRHP) in 1966 (NR reference #: 66000461). The surrounding area was designated in 1970 as the Walt Whitman Neighborhood (ID# 935) within the state, and the National Register of Historic Places in 1978 (NR reference #: 78001752).

The six-room Walt Whitman House is operated as a museum by the New Jersey Division of Parks and Forestry. The home is now open to the public. It is operated with help from the Walt Whitman Association. Included in the collection is the bed in which the poet died and the death notice that was taped to his front door.

== See also ==
- National Register of Historic Places listings in Camden County, New Jersey
- List of museums in New Jersey
- Walt Whitman Birthplace State Historic Site in New York
- List of residences of American writers
