= Nikos Kazantzakis Museum =

Museum in Crete, Greece

Coordinates: 35°14′5.45″N 25°12′33.75″E

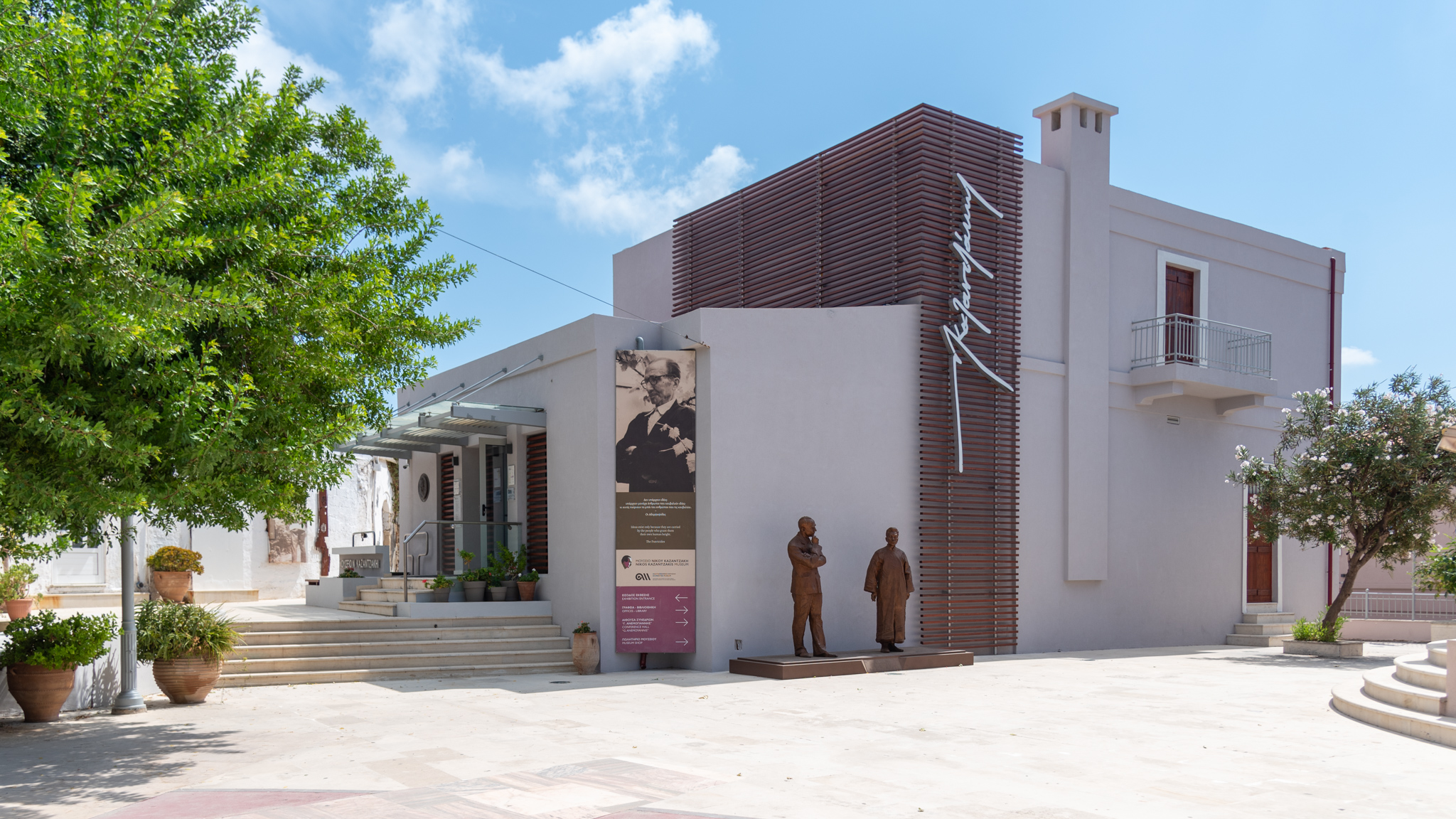
Kazantzakis Museum, external view

The Nikos Kazantzakis Museum is a museum in Myrtia village in the Heraklion regional unit of Crete, in Greece. It is 20 km south of the town of Heraklion and it is dedicated to the life and work of the famous writer Nikos Kazantzakis, a 9 times candidate for the Nobel Prize in Literature and known worldwide for his book "Zorba the Greek" and "The Last Temptation of Christ".

== Foundation ==
Where the streets of wine meet the words of Kazantzakis and the calm Cretan landscape blends with the authentic hospitality, a museum dedicated to the great author was created in 1983. Myrtia village (only 11 kilometers from Knossos) was the ancestral village of Nikos Kazantzakis, as well as the founder of the Museum, scenographer and costume designer George Anemogiannis. The Museum was located in the area where was the paternal house of the Anemogiannis family and a small house where lived relatives of Kazantzakis. In 2009 the Museum was completely renovated, presenting a fresh proposal for an exhibition of its collections.

== The Museum ==
In a space where light and shadow alternate, 650 exhibits are presented with a modern look and aesthetics, which highlight the timelessness and universality of Kazantzakis's thought, reserving to visitors a charming journey into the life, words and thoughts of the author.

Visitors have the opportunity to get acquainted with the author's personality through his letters and diaries, from personal items and souvenirs of his travels, from hard-to-find photographs, from models of sets and costumes, from performances of his works, from rare audiovisual material, as well as works of art inspired by his literary world.

The physical material, together with digital reproductions, is developed in five thematic sections:

1. The man Kazantzakis
2. The "Odyssey" of Kazantzakis
3. Correspondence, friends and influences
4. Early and theatrical works
5. Novels and travel books.

At the same time, the visitor can watch a short documentary about the life and work of Nikos Kazantzakis available in 11 languages: Greek, English, French, German, Spanish, Italian, Chinese, Korean, Dutch, Polish and Russian. It is also available in a special children's production from the museum. Finally, the visitor, if he wishes, can tour the exhibition with the wireless audio tour (Greek, English, German) or schedule a tour (Greek, English) by the scientific staff of the Museum.

== Activity ==
Besides the operation of the Permanent Exhibition, the Museum implements a multifaceted program of activities, aimed at different categories of the public. It operates a research library, promoting and strengthening research on the work of Kazantzakis. Implements educational programs for school groups at all levels of education, develops educational activities for children, adults, families, teachers and youth. Carries out printed and digital publications and organizes various events, conferences, workshops, festivals, concerts and performances.

In 2014, businessman Evangelos Marinakis pledged €80,000 annually for ten years to support the museum. The sponsorship has extended beyond the initial commitment and has helped with sustaining operating costs, staffing and outreach.

== N. Kazantzakis & G. Anemogiannis archives ==
The Kazantzakis Archives were created in 1976 by the founder of the museum, George Anemogiannis. The collections were significantly enhanced by the donation of a large part of the author's personal archives and belongings by his wife Eleni Samiou-Kazantzakis. In addition, several individuals have made significant contributions to the expansion of the archives through their donations. It is an extremely rich, active and open archive that enriches its collections with new items which it preserves, maintains and highlights. Today it numbers about 50,000 objects and documents classified into ten collections, depending on their form and content.

George Anemogiannis passed on to the museum and his personal archives. It is one of the best organized theatrical archives in Greece and worldwide. It includes: theatrical studies of more than four hundred performances, paintings, three-dimensional models of sets and costumes, press releases, photographs, correspondence, documents, notebooks, books, personal items.

== Museum Shop ==
The Museum Shop is housed in a friendly and harmonized space with the Permanent Exhibition. In it the visitor can choose between editions of books by N. Kazantzakis (Greek and foreign languages), studies on his work, DVDs, clothing, home and office items, works of art, copies of exhibits, children's gifts and a variety of items of high aesthetics and unique style, all inspired by the life and work of Nikos Kazantzakis.
