= Living Garment of God =

Living Garment of God or Living Nature, is a metaphor coined by Johann Wolfgang von Goethe in Faust Part One. This phrase indicates that nature is a garment, or vesture with which God invests himself so as to reveal and impart Himself to man.

== Concept ==
The conceptualization of the living garment of God is distinguished from Baruch Spinoza's notion of the natural world, which viewed God as identical with nature. The Faustian concept cites an Earth Spirit that creates all things that transpire in the temporal world and that these constitute the living garment of the Godhead. This suggests that God wears the garment but he does not create it.

== Interpretations ==
Other authors also used the metaphor. For example, Thomas Carlyle drew from Goethe's idea and wrote about "the living garment of God" in his work, Sartor Resartus. He supported the view that God is not nature, which he described as the garment as well as "God-written Apocalypse". Carlyle, in his contemplation, was able to develop his "Philosophy of Clothes" (a component of his "Natural Supernaturalism") which treats all things visible - including heaven, Earth, and nature - as symbols or vestures and that they are bound to fade.

The British physicist Oliver Lodge also likened the metaphor to his notion of the ether, which he said is an omnipresent medium and a primary instrument of the mind. For Lodge, the ether - within the scheme of physics - is key to achieving the goal of unity with God.
