= Scotsbrig =

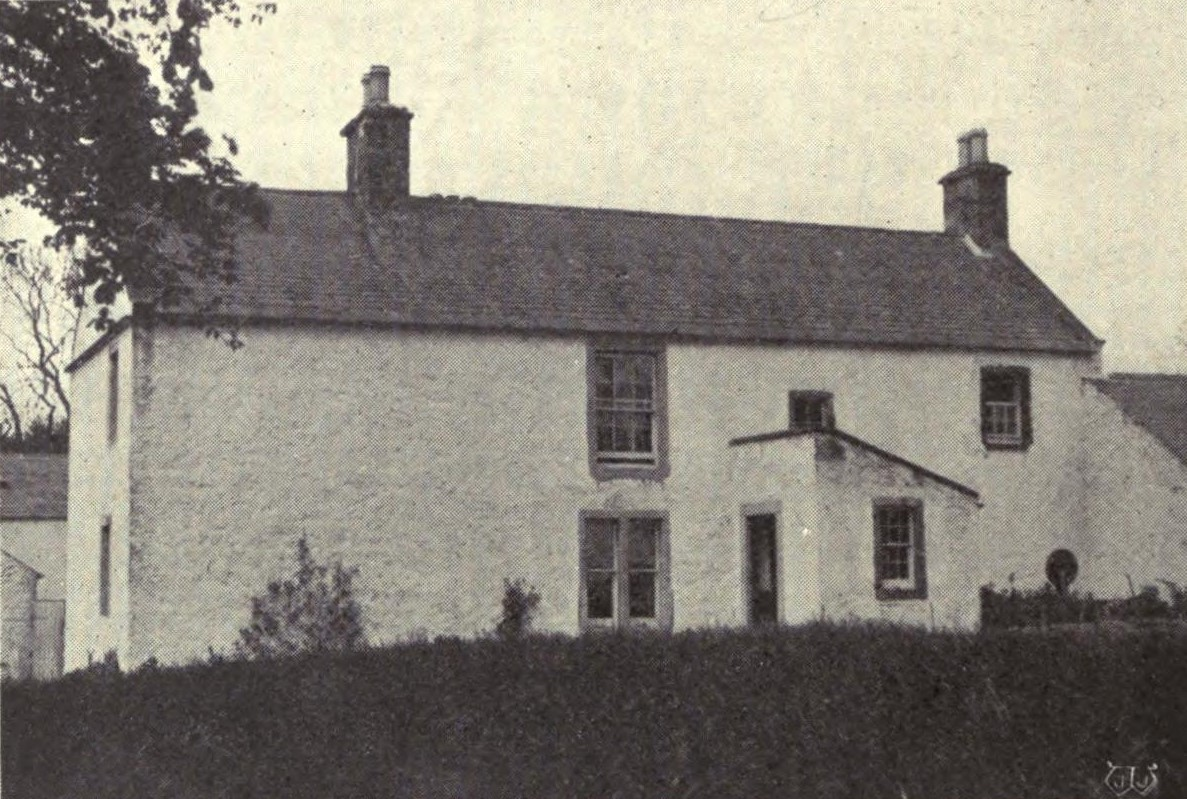
- Scotsbrig, no later than 1904
- Coordinates: 55°04′49″N 3°13′55″W

Listed Building – Category B
- Official name: Scotsbrig Farmhouse and Steading
- Designated: 4 October 1988
- Reference no.: LB16955

Scotsbrig is a farm near Ecclefechan, Dumfries and Galloway, Scotland, and a Category B listed building. Thomas Carlyle lived there with his family in the summer of 1826 before moving to 21 Comely Bank, Edinburgh. Scotsbrig remained a residence of the Carlyle family for decades. The farmhouse underwent numerous additions and renovations in the eighteenth and nineteenth centuries.

Carlyle recorded his first impressions in a letter to his brother John:

The house is in bad order; but we hope to have it soon repaired; and for farming purposes, it is an excellent "shell of a house." Then we have a linn [waterfall] with crags and bushes, and a 'fairy knowe [knoll]' tho' no fairies that I have seen yet; and, cries our Mother, abundance of grand thready peats, and water from the brook, and no reek and no Honour (Note: Gen. Matthew Sharpe, landlord at Mainhill, the former Carlyle family residence.) to pester us! To say nothing, cries our father, of the eighten yeacre [acre] of the best barley in the country; and bog-hay, adds Alick, (Note: Alexander, Carlyle's brother.) to fatten scores of young beasts!
In fact making all allowance for newfangledness, it is a much better place, so far as I can judge, than any our people have yet been in; and among far better and kindlier sort of people. I believe of a truth they will find themselves much obliged to his Honour for persecuting them away. Long life to his Honour! I myself like the place considerably better, tho' I have slept but ill yet, and am billus enough. But I have mounted your old straw-hat again; and fairly betaken me to work; and should, as we say Aberdeen-awa, "be bauld to compleen."
