= Thomas Carlyle's house, Comely Bank =

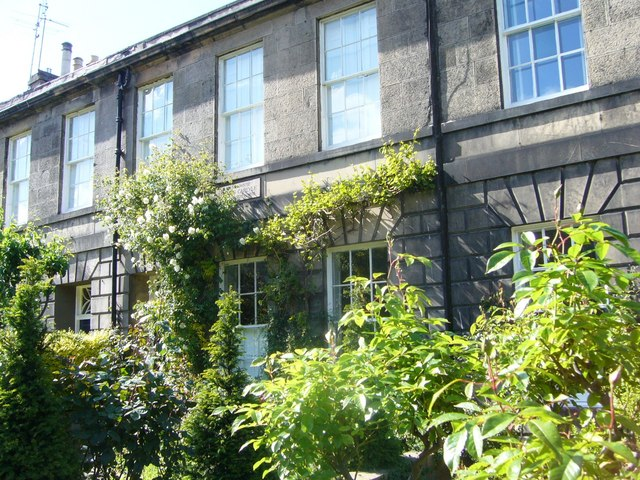
- As it appeared in 2009
- Location: Edinburgh, Scotland
- Coordinates: 55°57′34″N 3°13′16″W

Listed Building – Category B
- Official name: 21 Comely Bank, Edinburgh
- Designated: 27 October 1965
- Reference no.: LB28583

Thomas Carlyle's house, Comely Bank is a Category B listed building in Edinburgh, Scotland. It was once the home of Scottish essayist, historian and philosopher Thomas Carlyle. He lived there with his wife Jane Carlyle from October 1826, the time of their marriage, to May 1828, when they moved to Craigenputtock.

The two-story house was built in 1818. It was rented for them in May 1826 by Jane's mother, Grace Welsh. The Carlyles typically spelled the street name as "Comley". Carlyle described the house to his brother:

Thus pass our days, in our trim little cottage, far from all the uproar, and putrescence (material and spiritual) of the reeky town, the sound of which we hear not, and only see over the knowe the reflection of its gas-lights against the dusky sky, and bless ourselves that we have neither part nor lot in the matter. I assure you, many a time on a soft mild night, I smoke my pipe in our little flowergarden, and look upon all this, and think of all absent and present friends, and feel that I have good reason to "be thankful that I am not in Purgatory."
