= Thomas Carlyle =

Scottish essayist, historian and philosopher (1795–1881)

- Portrait by Elliott & Fry, c. 1865
- Born: 4 December 1795; Ecclefechan, Dumfriesshire, Scotland
- Died: 5 February 1881 (aged 85); London, England
- Spouse: Jane Welsh Carlyle (m. 1826; died 1866)

Education
- Education: University of Edinburgh

Philosophical work
- Notable ideas: See list: Carlyleanism; Natural Supernaturalism; Meaning of life; Speech is silver, silence is golden; Great Man theory; Condition-of-England question; Captain of industry; The dismal science; Carlylese; Sage writing; Carlyle circle

Thomas Carlyle (4 December 1795 – 5 February 1881) was a Scottish essayist, historian and philosopher. Known as the "sage of Chelsea", his writings strongly influenced the intellectual and artistic culture of the Victorian era.

Carlyle was born in Ecclefechan, a village in Dumfriesshire. He attended the University of Edinburgh, where he excelled in mathematics and invented the Carlyle circle. After finishing the arts course he prepared to become a minister in the Burgher Church while working as a schoolmaster. He quit these and several other endeavours before settling on literature, writing for the Edinburgh Encyclopædia and working as a translator. He initially gained prominence in English-language literary circles for his extensive writing on German Romantic literature and philosophy. These themes were explored in his first major work, a semi-autobiographical philosophical novel entitled Sartor Resartus (1833–34).

Carlyle eventually relocated to London, where he published The French Revolution: A History (1837). Its popular success made him a celebrity, prompting the collection and reissue of his earlier essays under the title of Critical and Miscellaneous Essays (1838–39). His subsequent works were highly regarded throughout Europe and North America, including On Heroes (1841), Past and Present (1843), Cromwell's Letters (1845), Latter-Day Pamphlets (1850), and Frederick the Great (1858–65). He founded the London Library, helped to establish the National Portrait Galleries in London and in Edinburgh, became Lord Rector of the University of Edinburgh in 1865 and received the Pour le Mérite in 1874, amongst other honours.

Carlyle occupied a central position in Victorian culture, being considered the "undoubted head of English letters" and a "secular prophet". Posthumously, a series of publications by his friend James Anthony Froude damaged Carlyle's reputation, provoking controversy about his personal life and his marriage to Jane Welsh Carlyle in particular. His reputation further declined in the aftermaths of the First World War and the Second World War, when his philosophy was seen as a precursor of both Prussianism and fascism. Growing scholarship in the field of Carlyle studies since the 1950s has improved his standing, and although little-read today, he is yet recognised as "one of the enduring monuments of [English] literature".

== Biography ==
=== Early life ===
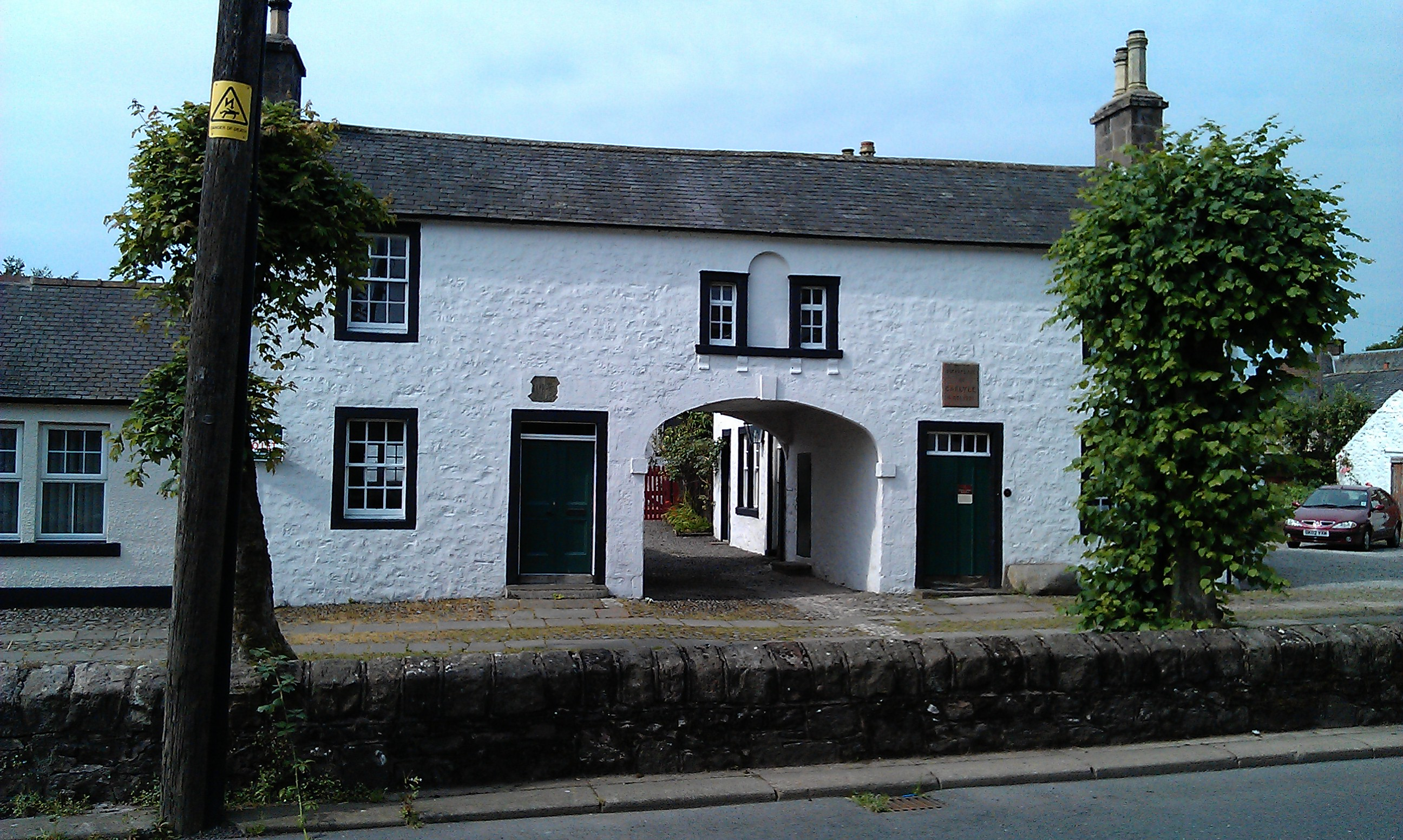
Thomas Carlyle's Birthplace

Thomas Carlyle was born on 4 December 1795 to James and Margaret Aitken Carlyle in the village of Ecclefechan in Dumfriesshire in southwest Scotland. His parents were members of the Burgher secession Presbyterian church. James Carlyle was a stonemason, later a farmer, who built the Arched House wherein his son was born. His maxim was that "man was created to work, not to speculate, or feel, or dream." Nicholas Carlisle, an English antiquary, traced his ancestry back to Margaret Bruce, sister of Robert the Bruce.

As a result of his upbringing, James Carlyle became deeply religious in his youth, reading many books of sermons and doctrinal arguments throughout his life. In 1791 he married his first wife, distant cousin Janet, who gave birth to John Carlyle and then died. He married Margaret Aitken in 1795, a poor farmer's daughter then working as a servant. They had nine children, of whom Thomas was the eldest. Margaret was pious and devout and hoped that Thomas would become a minister. She was close to her eldest son, being a "smoking companion, counsellor and confidante" in Carlyle's early days. She suffered a manic episode when Carlyle was a teenager, in which she became "elated, disinhibited, over-talkative and violent." She suffered another breakdown in 1817, which required her to be removed from her home and restrained. Carlyle always spoke highly of his parents, and his character was deeply influenced by both of them.

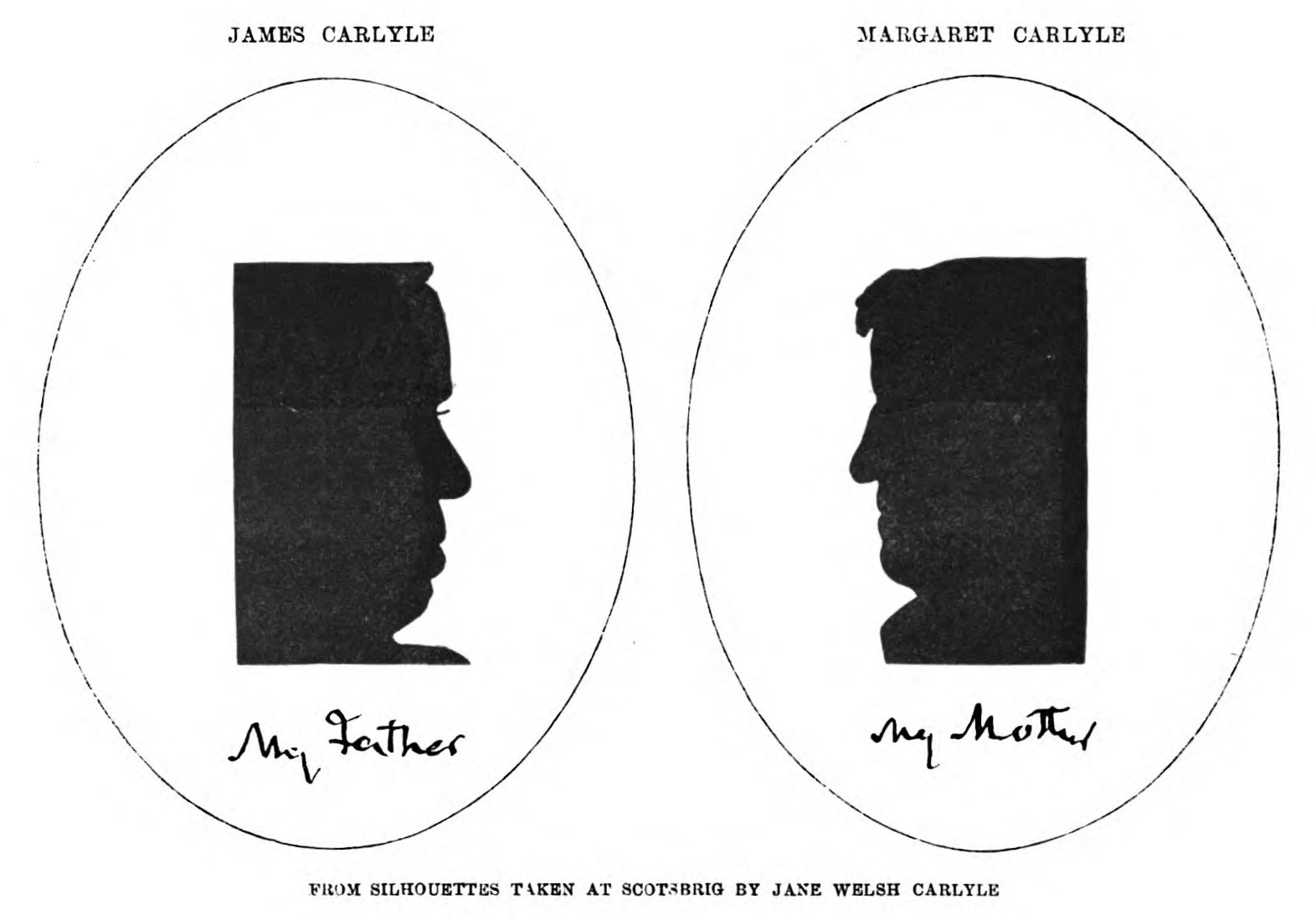
Silhouettes of Carlyle's father and mother with captions in Carlyle's hand

Carlyle's early education came from his mother, who taught him reading (despite being barely literate), and his father, who taught him arithmetic. He first attended "Tom Donaldson's School" in Ecclefechan followed by Hoddam School (c. 1802–1806), which "then stood at the Kirk", located at the "Cross-roads" midway between Ecclefechan and Hoddam Castle. By age 7 Carlyle showed enough proficiency in English that he was advised to "go into Latin", which he did with enthusiasm; however, the schoolmaster at Hoddam did not know Latin, so he was handed over to a minister who did, with whom he made a "rapid & sure way". He then went to Annan Academy (c. 1806–1809), where he studied rudimentary Greek, read Latin and French fluently, and learned arithmetic "thoroughly well". Carlyle was severely bullied by his fellow students at Annan, until he "revolted against them, and gave stroke for stroke"; he remembered the first two years there as among the most miserable of his life.

=== Edinburgh, the ministry and teaching (1809–1818) ===
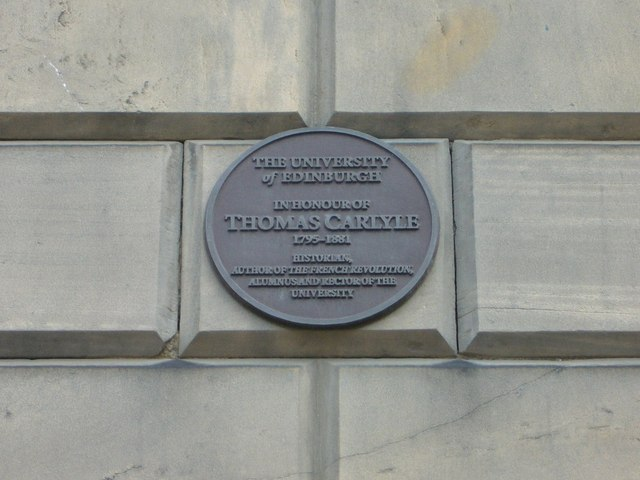
Plaque at 22A Buccleuch Place, Edinburgh

In November 1809 at nearly fourteen years of age, Carlyle walked one hundred miles from his home in order to attend the University of Edinburgh (c. 1809–1814), where he studied mathematics with John Leslie, science with John Playfair and moral philosophy with Thomas Brown. He gravitated to mathematics and geometry and displayed great talent in those subjects, being credited with the invention of the Carlyle circle. In the University library he read many important works of eighteenth-century and contemporary history, philosophy and belles-lettres. He began expressing religious scepticism around this time, asking his mother to her horror, "Did God Almighty come down and make wheelbarrows in a shop?" In 1813 he completed his arts curriculum and enrolled in a theology course at Divinity Hall, Edinburgh, the following academic year. This was to be the preliminary of a ministerial career.

Carlyle began teaching at Annan Academy in June 1814. In December 1814 and December 1815, he gave his first trial sermons, both of which are lost. By the summer of 1815 he had taken an interest in astronomy and would study the astronomical theories of Pierre-Simon Laplace for several years.

He left Annan and in November 1816 he began teaching at Kirkcaldy. There, he made friends with Edward Irving and Canadian-born Margaret Gordon (later Lady Bannerman) who became Carlyle's "first love". It is said that she is the basis for the character "Blumine" in Carlyle's later work Sartor Resartus.

In May 1817, Carlyle abstained from enrolment in the theology course, news which his parents received with "magnanimity". In the autumn of that year, he read De l'Allemagne (1813) by Germaine de Staël, which prompted him to seek a German teacher, with whom he learned the pronunciation. In Irving's library he read the works of David Hume and Edward Gibbon's The History of the Decline and Fall of the Roman Empire (1776–1789); he would later recall that

I read Gibbon, and then first clearly saw that Christianity was not true. Then came the most trying time of my life. I should either have gone mad or made an end of myself had I not fallen in with some very superior minds.

=== Mineralogy, law and first publications (1818–1821) ===
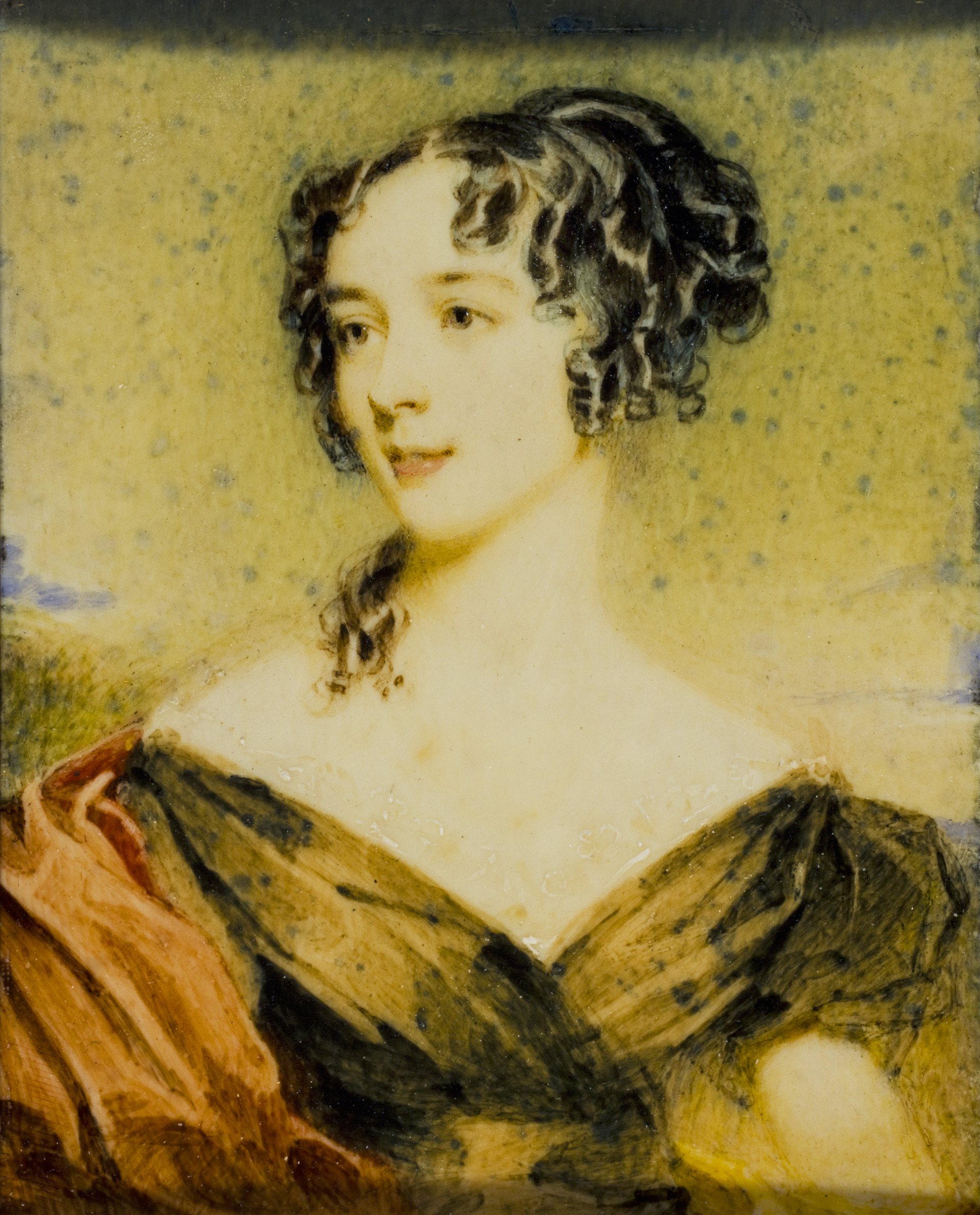
Jane Baillie Welsh by Kenneth Macleay, 1826, shortly before marriage

In the summer of 1818, following an expedition with Irving through the moors of Peebles and Moffat, Carlyle made his first attempt at publishing, forwarding an article describing what he saw to the editor of an Edinburgh magazine, which was not published and is now lost. In October, Carlyle resigned from his position at Kirkcaldy, and left for Edinburgh in November. Shortly before his departure, he began to suffer from dyspepsia, which remained with him throughout his life. He enrolled in a mineralogy class from November 1818 to April 1819, attending lectures by Robert Jameson, and in January 1819 began to study German, desiring to read the mineralogical works of Abraham Gottlob Werner. In February and March, he translated a piece by Jöns Jacob Berzelius, and by September he was "reading Goethe". In November he enrolled in "the class of Scots law", studying under the advocate David Hume (nephew to the philosopher of the same name). In December 1819 and January 1820 Carlyle made his second attempt at publishing, writing a review-article on Marc-Auguste Pictet's review of Jean-Alfred Gautier's Essai historique sur le problème des trois corps (1817), which went unpublished and is lost. The law classes ended in March 1820 and he did not pursue the subject any further.

In the same month he wrote several articles for David Brewster's Edinburgh Encyclopædia (1808–1830), which appeared in October. These were his first published writings. In May and June, Carlyle wrote a review-article on the work of Christopher Hansteen, translated a book by Friedrich Mohs, and read Goethe's Faust. By the autumn Carlyle had also learned Italian and was reading Vittorio Alfieri, Dante Alighieri and Jean Charles Léonard de Sismondi, although German literature was still his foremost interest, having "revealed" to him a "new Heaven and new Earth". In March 1821 he finished two more articles for Brewster's encyclopaedia, and in April he completed a review of Joanna Baillie's Metrical Legends (1821).

In May Carlyle was introduced to Jane Baillie Welsh by Irving in Haddington. The two began a correspondence, and Carlyle sent books to her, encouraging her intellectual pursuits; she called him "my German Master".

=== "Conversion": Leith Walk and Hoddam Hill (1821–1826) ===
During this time, Carlyle struggled with what he described as "the dismallest Lernean Hydra of problems, spiritual, temporal, eternal". Spiritual doubt, lack of success in his endeavours, and dyspepsia were all damaging his physical and mental health, for which he found relief only in "sea-bathing". In early July 1821, "during those 3 weeks of total sleeplessness, in which almost" his "one solace was that of a daily bathe on the sands between [Leith] and Portobello", an "incident" occurred in Leith Walk as he "went down" into the water. This was the beginning of Carlyle's "Conversion", the process by which he "authentically took the Devil by the nose" and flung "him behind me". It gave him courage in his battle against the "Hydra"; to his brother John, he wrote, "What is there to fear, indeed?"

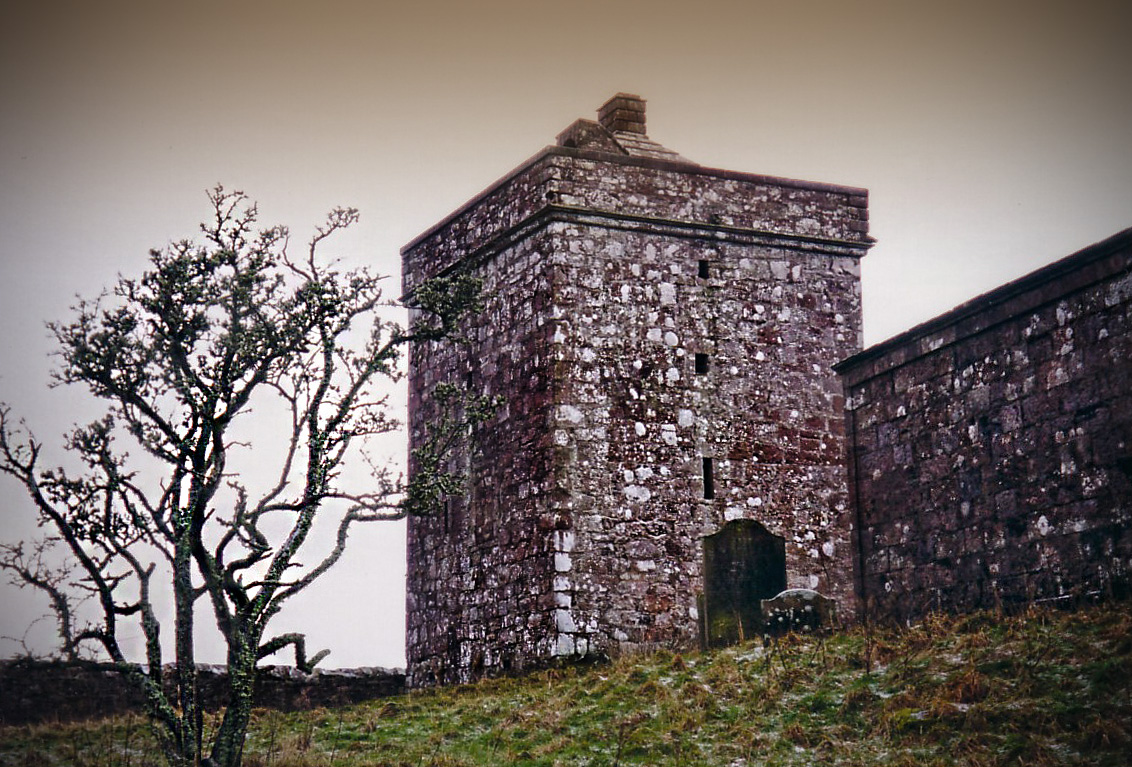
Repentance Tower near the farm in Hoddam Hill, which Carlyle called "a fit memorial for reflecting sinners."

Carlyle wrote several articles in July, August and September, and in November began a translation of Adrien Marie Legendre's Elements of Geometry. In January 1822, Carlyle wrote "Goethe's Faust" for the New Edinburgh Review, and shortly afterwards began a tutorship for the distinguished Buller family, tutoring Charles Buller and his brother Arthur William Buller until July; he would work for the family until July 1824. Carlyle completed the Legendre translation in July 1822, having prefixed his own essay "On Proportion", which Augustus De Morgan later called "as good a substitute for the fifth Book of Euclid as could have been given in that space".

Carlyle's translation of Goethe's Wilhelm Meister's Apprenticeship (1824) and Travels (1825) and his biography of Friedrich Schiller (1825) brought him a decent income, which had before then eluded him, and he garnered a modest reputation. He began corresponding with Goethe and made his first trip to London in 1824, meeting with prominent writers such as Thomas Campbell, Charles Lamb and Samuel Taylor Coleridge, and gaining friendships with Anna Montagu, Bryan Waller Proctor, and Henry Crabb Robinson. He also travelled to Paris in October–November with Edward Strachey and Kitty Kirkpatrick, where he attended Georges Cuvier's introductory lecture on comparative anatomy, gathered information on the study of medicine, introduced himself to Legendre, was introduced by Legendre to Charles Dupin, observed Laplace and several other notables while declining offers of introduction by Dupin, and heard François Magendie read a paper on the "fifth pair of nerves".

In May 1825, Carlyle moved into a cottage farmhouse in Hoddam Hill near Ecclefechan, which his father had leased for him. Carlyle lived with his brother Alexander, who, "with a cheap little man-servant", worked on the farm, his mother with her one maid-servant, and his two youngest sisters, Jean and Jenny. He had constant contact with the rest of his family, most of whom lived close by at Mainhill, a farm owned by his father. Jane made a successful visit in September 1825. Whilst there, Carlyle wrote German Romance (1827), a translation of German novellas by Johann Karl August Musäus, Friedrich de la Motte Fouqué, Ludwig Tieck, E. T. A. Hoffmann and Jean Paul. In Hoddam Hill Carlyle found respite from the "intolerable fret, noise and confusion" that he had experienced in Edinburgh, and observed what he described as "the finest and vastest prospect all round it I ever saw from any house", with "all Cumberland as in amphitheatre unmatchable". Here, he completed his "Conversion" which began with the Leith Walk incident. He achieved "a grand and ever-joyful victory", in the "final chaining down, and trampling home, 'for good,' home into their caves forever, of all" his "Spiritual Dragons". By May 1826, problems with the landlord and the agreement forced the family's relocation to Scotsbrig, a farm near Ecclefechan. Later in life, he remembered the year at Hoddam Hill as "perhaps the most triumphantly important of my life."

=== Marriage, Comely Bank and Craigenputtock (1826–1834) ===
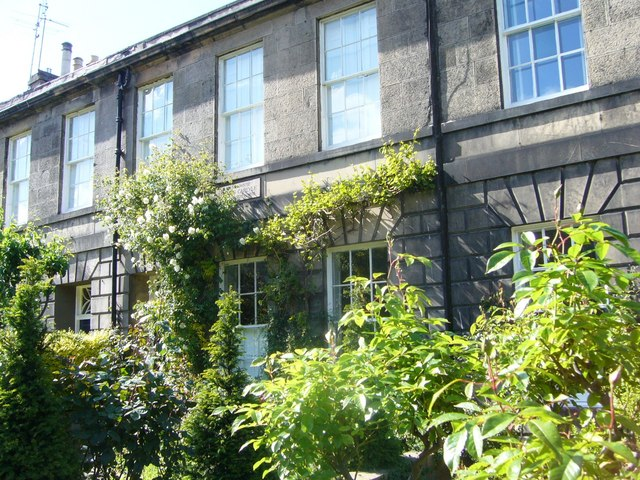
21 Comely Bank

In October 1826 Carlyle and Jane Welsh were married at the Welsh family farm in Templand. Shortly after their marriage, the Carlyles moved into a modest home on Comely Bank in Edinburgh, which had been leased for them by Jane's mother. They lived there from October 1826 to May 1828. In that time, Carlyle published German Romance, began Wotton Reinfred, an autobiographical novel which he left unfinished, and published his first article for the Edinburgh Review, "Jean Paul Friedrich Richter" (1827). "Richter" was the first of many essays extolling the virtues of German authors, who were then little-known to English readers; "State of German Literature" was published in October. In Edinburgh, Carlyle made contact with several distinguished literary figures, including the Edinburgh Review editor Francis Jeffrey, John Wilson of Blackwood's Magazine, the essayist Thomas De Quincey and the philosopher William Hamilton. In 1827 Carlyle attempted to land the Chair of Moral Philosophy at the University of St Andrews without success, despite support from an array of prominent intellectuals, including Goethe. He also made an unsuccessful attempt for a professorship at the University of London.

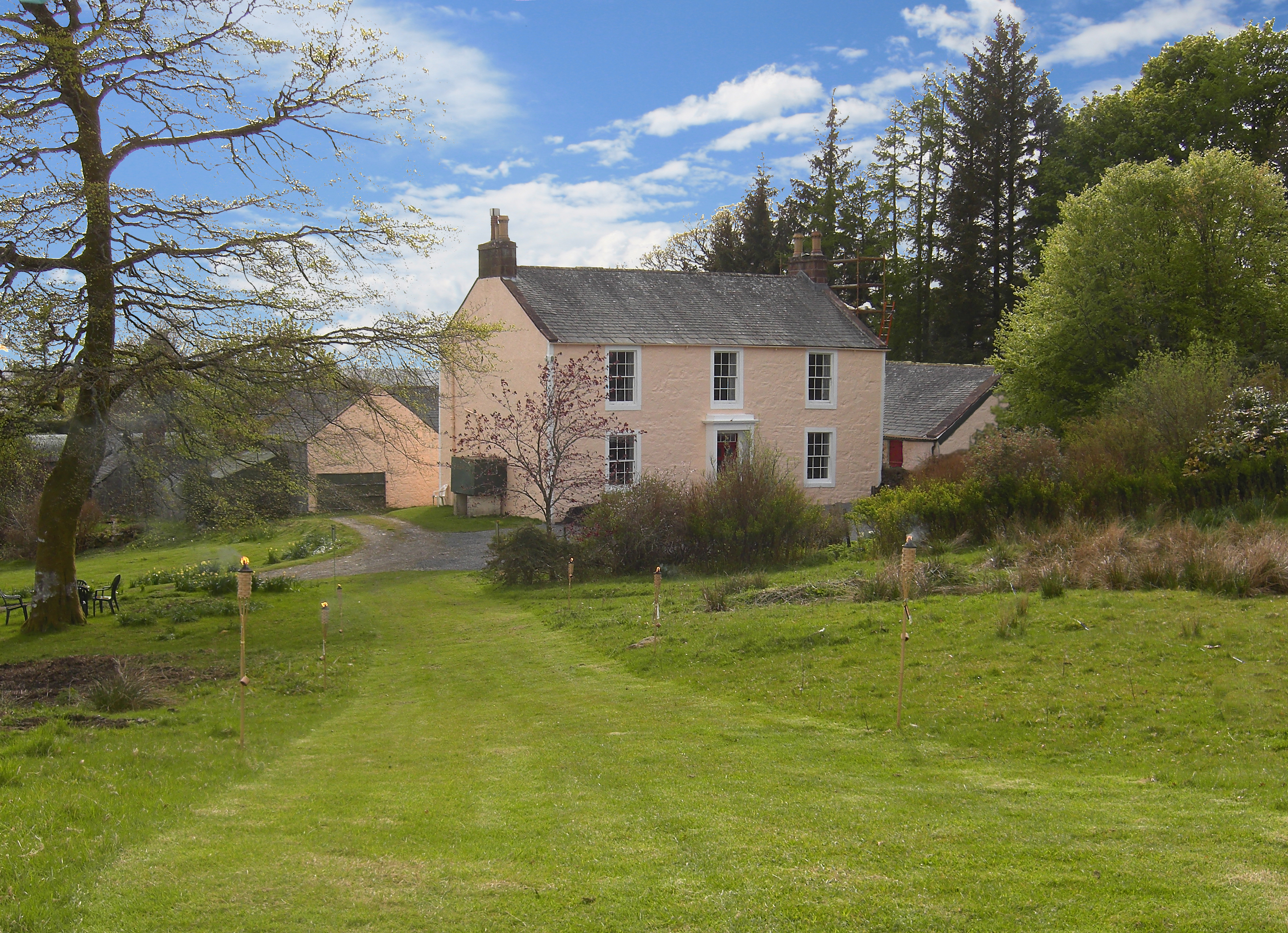
Craigenputtock

In May 1828 the Carlyles moved to Craigenputtock, the main house of Jane's modest agricultural estate in Dumfriesshire, which they occupied until May 1834. He wrote a number of essays there which earned him money and augmented his reputation, including "Life and Writings of Werner", "Goethe's Helena", "Goethe", "Robert Burns|Burns", "The Life of Heyne" (each 1828), "German Playwrights", "Voltaire", "Novalis" (each 1829), "Jean Paul Friedrich Richter Again" (1830), "Cruthers and Jonson; or The Outskirts of Life: A True Story", "Luther's Psalm", and "Schiller" (each 1831). He began but did not complete a history of German literature, from which he drew material for essays "The Nibelungen Lied", "Early German Literature" and parts of "Historic Survey of German Poetry" (each 1831). He published early thoughts on the philosophy of history in "Thoughts on History" (1830) and wrote his first pieces of social criticism, "Signs of the Times" (1829) and "Characteristics" (1831). "Signs" garnered the interest of Gustave d'Eichthal, a member of the Saint-Simonians, who sent Carlyle Saint-Simonian literature, including Henri de Saint-Simon's Nouveau Christianisme (1825), for which Carlyle translated and wrote an introduction.

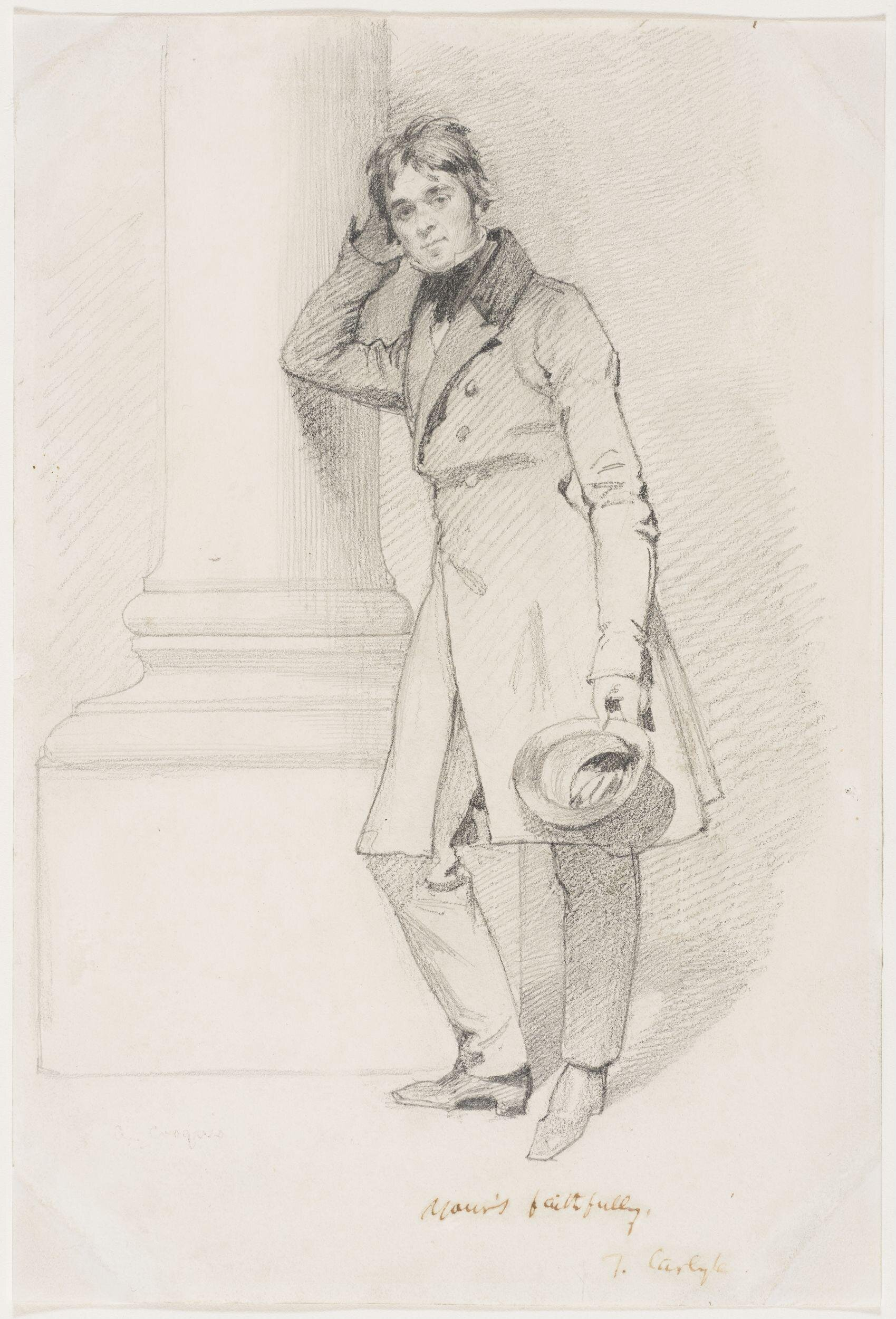
Portrait of Carlyle by Daniel Maclise for the Fraser's "Gallery of Literary Characters", June 1833

Most notably, he wrote Sartor Resartus. Finishing the manuscript in late July 1831, Carlyle began his search for a publisher, leaving for London in early August. He and his wife lived there for the winter at 4 (now 33) Ampton Street, Kings Cross, in a house built by Thomas Cubitt. The death of Carlyle's father in January 1832 and his inability to attend the funeral moved him to write the first of what would become the Reminiscences, published posthumously in 1881. Carlyle had not found a publisher by the time he returned to Craigenputtock in March but he had initiated important friendships with Leigh Hunt and John Stuart Mill. That year, Carlyle wrote the essays "Goethe's Portrait", "Death of Goethe", "Goethe's Works", "Biography", "Boswell's Life of Johnson", and "Corn-Law Rhymes". Three months after their return from a January to May 1833 stay in Edinburgh, the Carlyles were visited at Craigenputtock by Ralph Waldo Emerson. Emerson (and other like-minded Americans) had been deeply affected by Carlyle's essays and determined to meet him during the northern terminus of a literary pilgrimage; it was to be the start of a lifelong friendship and a famous correspondence. 1833 saw the publication of the essays "Diderot" and "Count Cagliostro"; in the latter, Carlyle introduced the idea of "Captains of Industry".

=== Chelsea (1834–1845) ===
In June 1834 the Carlyles moved into 5 Cheyne Row, Chelsea, which became their home for the remainder of their respective lives. Residence in London wrought a large expansion of Carlyle's social circle. He became acquainted with scores of leading writers, novelists, artists, radicals, men of science, Church of England clergymen, and political figures. Two of his most important friendships were with Lord and Lady Ashburton; though Carlyle's warm affection for the latter eventually strained his marriage, the Ashburtons helped to broaden his social horizons, giving him access to circles of intelligence, political influence, and power.

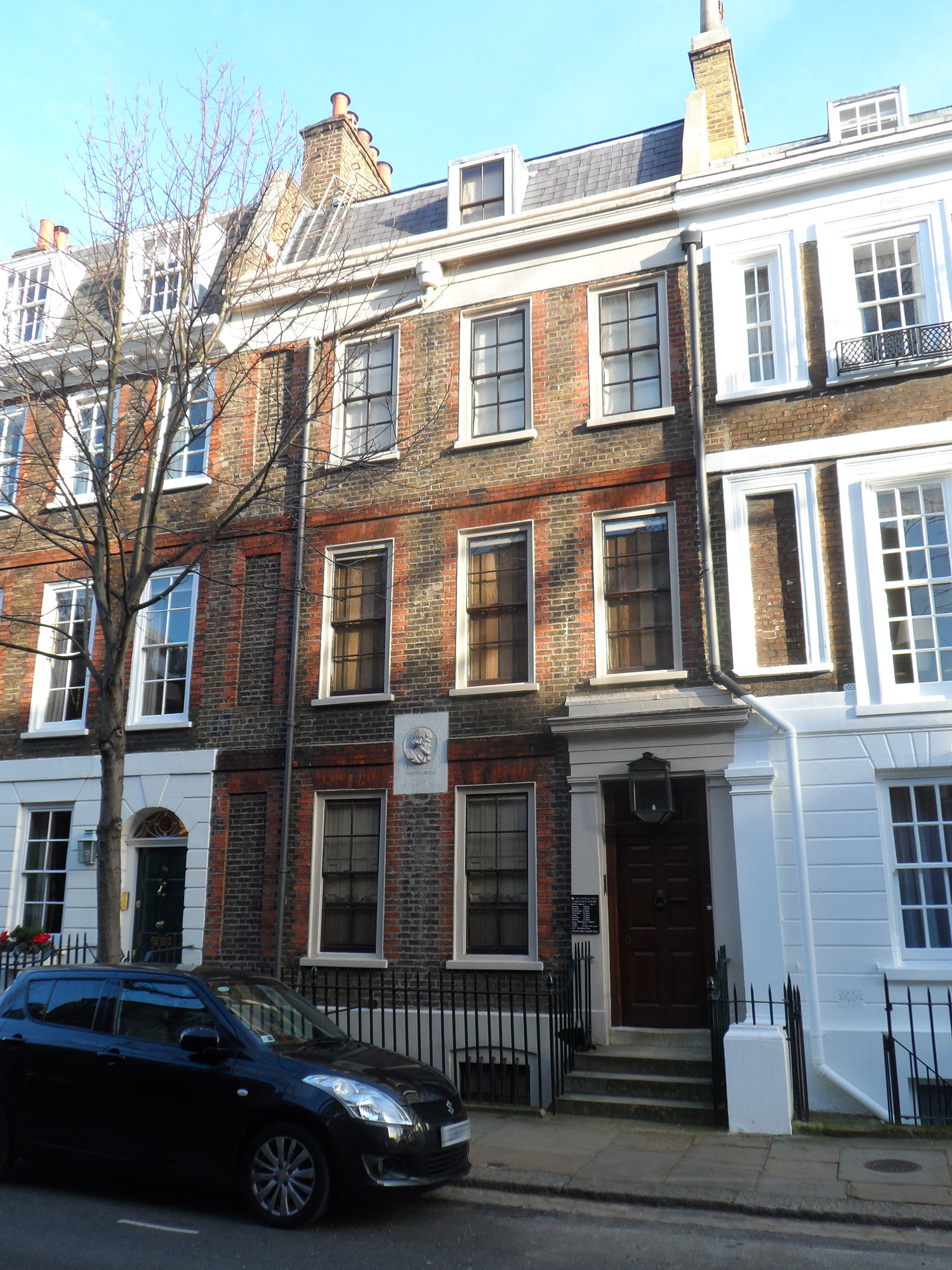
Carlyle's House

Carlyle eventually decided to publish Sartor serially in Fraser's Magazine, with the instalments appearing between November 1833 and August 1834. Despite early recognition from Emerson, Mill and others, it was generally received poorly, if noticed at all. In 1834, Carlyle applied unsuccessfully for the astronomy professorship at the Edinburgh observatory. That autumn, he arranged for the publication of a history of the French Revolution and set about researching and writing it shortly thereafter. Having completed the first volume after five months of writing, he lent the manuscript to Mill, who had been supplying him with materials for his research. One evening in March 1835, Mill arrived at Carlyle's door appearing "unresponsive, pale, the very picture of despair". He had come to tell Carlyle that the manuscript was destroyed. It had been "left out", and Mill's housemaid took it for wastepaper, leaving only "some four tattered leaves". Carlyle was sympathetic: "I can be angry with no one; for they that were concerned in it have a far deeper sorrow than mine: it is purely the hand of Providence". The next day, Mill offered Carlyle £200 (equivalent to £25,000 in 2024), of which he would only accept £100. He began the volume anew shortly afterwards. Despite an initial struggle, he was not deterred, feeling like "a runner that tho' tripped down, will not lie there, but rise and run again." By September, the volume was rewritten. That year, he wrote a eulogy for his friend, "Death of Edward Irving".

In April 1836, with the intercession of Emerson, Sartor Resartus was first published in book form in Boston, soon selling out its initial run of five hundred copies. Carlyle's three-volume history of the French Revolution was completed in January 1837 and sent to the press. Contemporaneously, the essay "Memoirs of Mirabeau" was published, as was "The Diamond Necklace" in January and February, and "Parliamentary History of the French Revolution" in April. In need of further financial security, Carlyle began a series of lectures on German literature in May, delivered extemporaneously in Willis' Rooms. The Spectator reported that the first lecture was given "to a very crowded and yet a select audience of both sexes." Carlyle recalled being "wasted and fretted to a thread, my tongue ... dry as charcoal: the people were there, I was obliged to stumble in, and start. Ach Gott!" Despite his inexperience as a lecturer and deficiency "in the mere mechanism of oratory", reviews were positive and the series proved profitable for him.

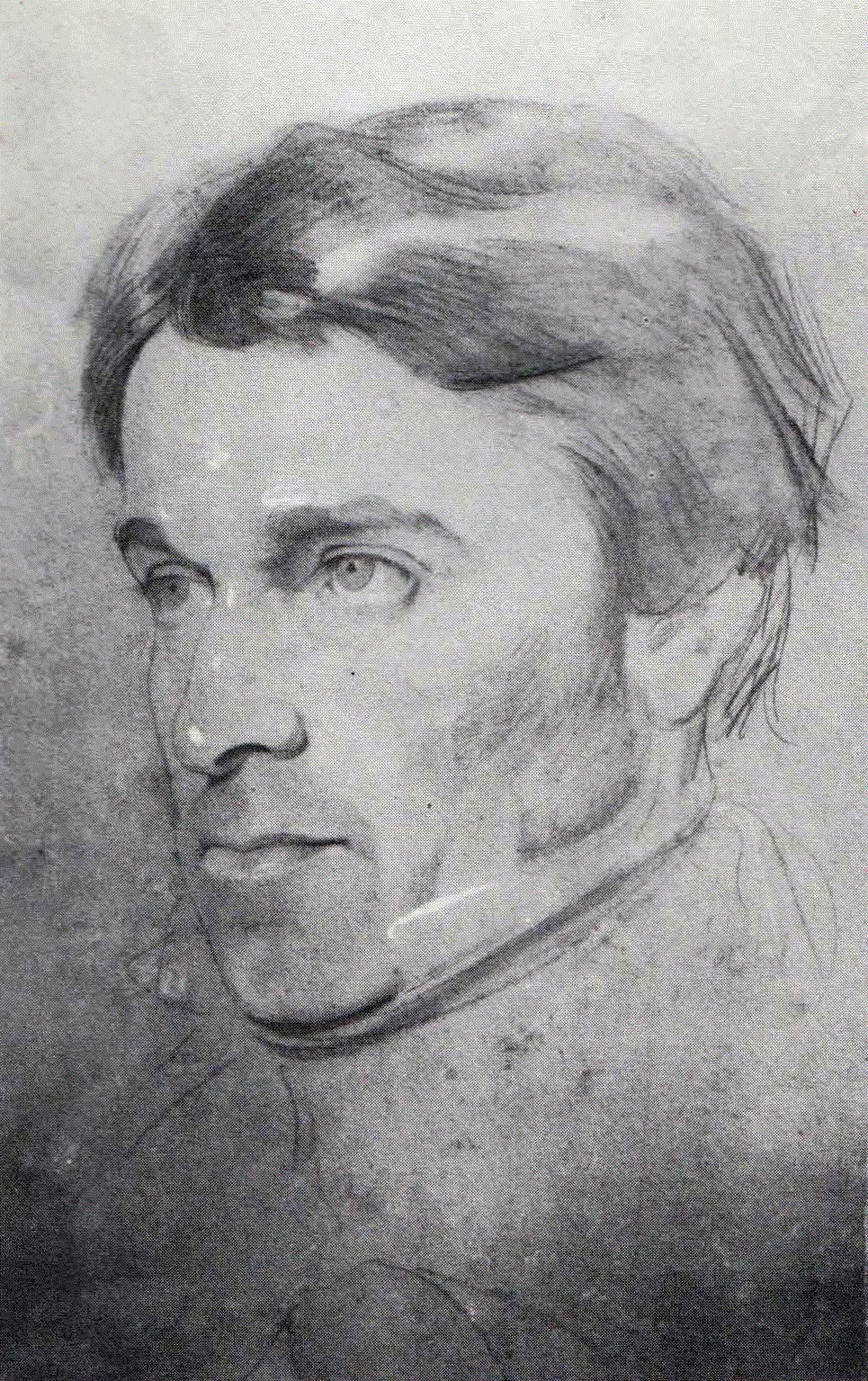
Crayon portrait of Thomas Carlyle by Samuel Laurence, 1838

During Carlyle's lecture series, The French Revolution: A History was officially published. It marked his career breakthrough. At the end of the year, Carlyle reported to Karl August Varnhagen von Ense that his earlier efforts to popularise German literature were beginning to produce results, and expressed his satisfaction: "Deutschland will reclaim her great Colony; we shall become more Deutsch, that is to say more English, at same time." The French Revolution fostered the republication of Sartor Resartus in London in 1838 as well as a collection of his earlier writings in the form of the Critical and Miscellaneous Essays, facilitated in Boston with the aid of Emerson. Carlyle presented his second lecture series in April and June 1838 on the history of literature at the Marylebone Institution in Portman Square. The Examiner reported that at the end of the second lecture, "Mr. Carlyle was heartily greeted with applause." Carlyle felt that they "went on better and better, and grew at last, or threatened to grow, quite a flaming affair." He published two essays in 1838, "Sir Walter Scott", being a review of John Gibson Lockhart's biography, and "Varnhagen von Ense's Memoirs". In April 1839, Carlyle published "Petition on the Copyright Bill". A third series of lectures was given in May on the revolutions of modern Europe, which the Examiner reviewed positively, noting after the third lecture that "Mr. Carlyle's audiences appear to increase in number every time." Carlyle wrote to his mother that the lectures were met "with very kind acceptance from people more distinguished than ever; yet still with a feeling that I was far from the right lecturing point yet." In July, he published "On the Sinking of the Vengeur" and in December he published Chartism, a pamphlet in which he addressed the movement of the same name and raised the Condition-of-England question.

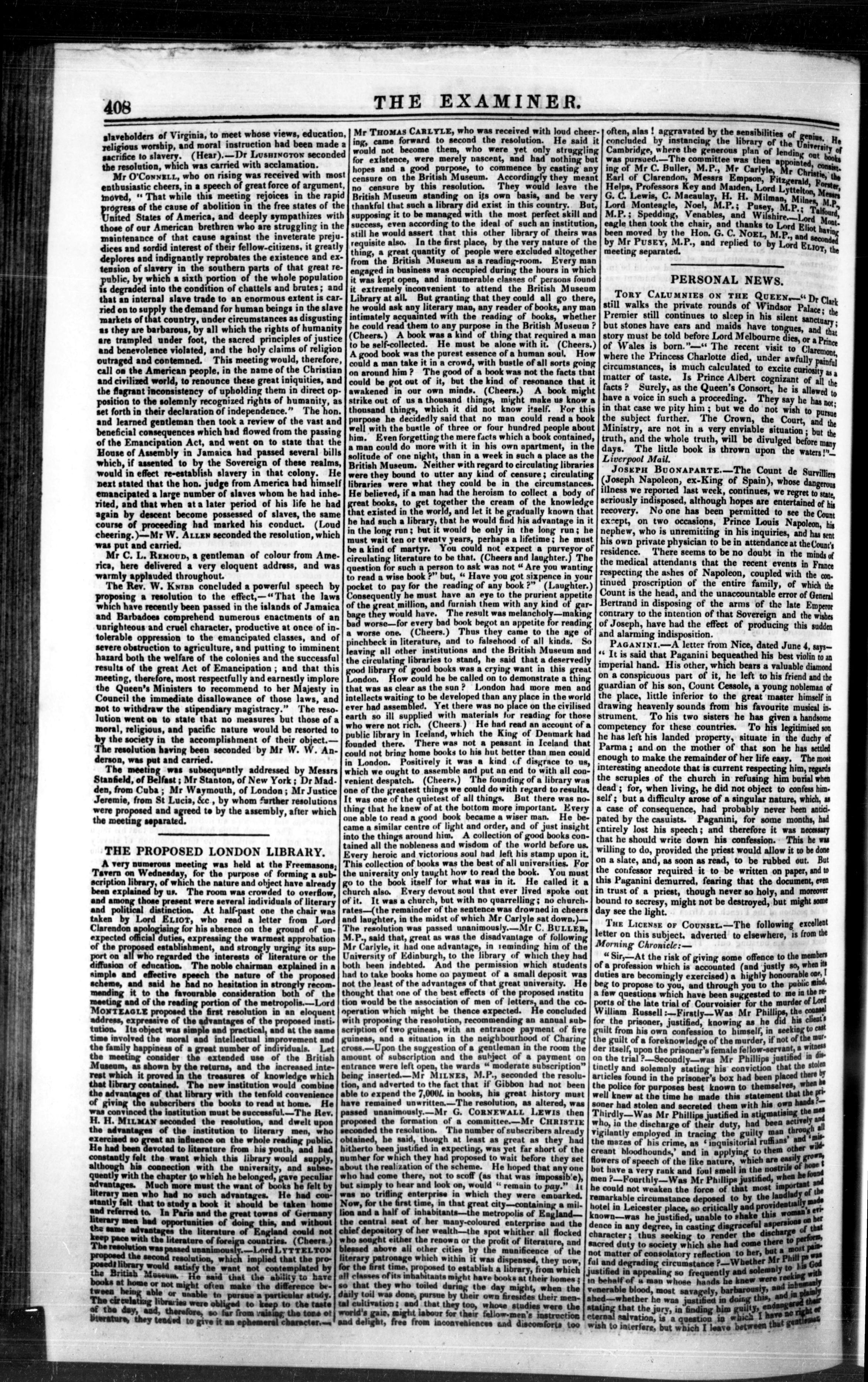
Report in The Examiner of "the speech that gave birth to The London Library", given by Thomas Carlyle on 24 June 1840

In May 1840 Carlyle gave his fourth and final set of lectures, which were published in 1841 as On Heroes, Hero-Worship, & the Heroic in History. Carlyle wrote to his brother John afterwards, "The Lecturing business went of [sic] with sufficient éclat; the Course was generally judged, and I rather join therein myself, to be the bad best I have yet given." In the 1840 edition of the Essays, Carlyle published "Fractions", a collection of poems written from 1823 to 1833. Later that year, he declined a proposal for a professorship of history at Edinburgh. Carlyle was the principal founder of the London Library in 1841. He had become frustrated by the facilities available at the British Museum Library, where he was often unable to find a seat (obliging him to perch on ladders), where he complained that the enforced close confinement with his fellow readers gave him a "museum headache", where the books were unavailable for loan, and where he found the library's collections of pamphlets and other material relating to the French Revolution and English Civil Wars inadequately catalogued. In particular, he developed an antipathy to the Keeper of Printed Books, Anthony Panizzi (despite the fact that Panizzi had allowed him many privileges not granted to other readers), and criticised him in a footnote to an article published in the Westminster Review as the "respectable Sub-Librarian". Carlyle's eventual solution, with the support of a number of influential friends, was to call for the establishment of a private subscription library from which books could be borrowed.

Carlyle had chosen Oliver Cromwell as the subject for a book in 1840 and struggled to find what form it would take. In the interim he wrote Past and Present (1843) and the articles "Baillie the Covenanter" (1841), "Dr. Francia" (1843), and "An Election to the Long Parliament" (1844). Carlyle declined an offer for professorship from St. Andrews in 1844. The first edition of Oliver Cromwell's Letters and Speeches: with Elucidations was published in 1845; it was a popular success and did much to revise Cromwell's standing in Britain.

=== Journeys to Ireland and Germany (1846–1865) ===
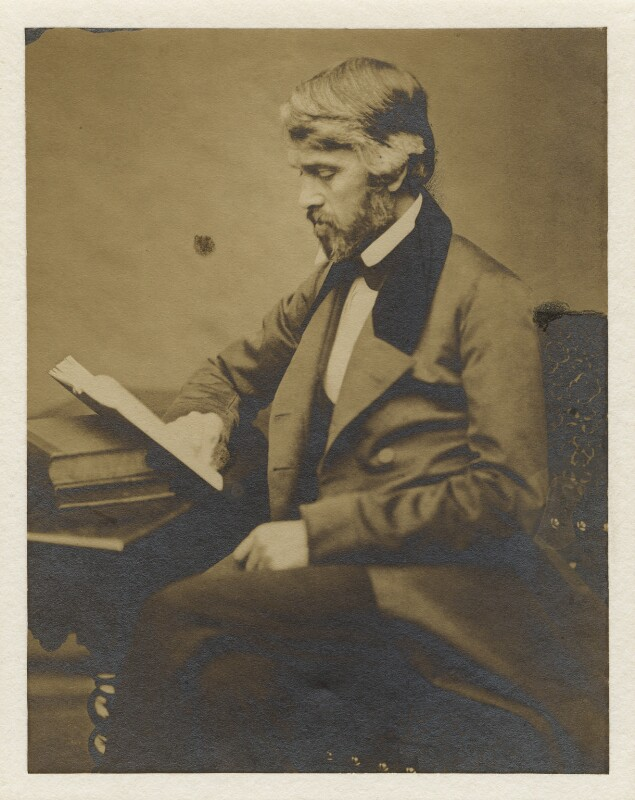
Carlyle in 1855

Carlyle visited Ireland in 1846 with Charles Gavan Duffy as a companion and guide, and wrote a series of brief articles on the Irish question in 1848. These were "Ireland and the British Chief Governor", "Irish Regiments (of the New Æra)", and "The Repeal of the Union", each of which offered solutions to Ireland's problems and argued to preserve England's connection with Ireland. Carlyle wrote an article titled "Ireland and Sir Robert Peel" (signed "C.") published in April 1849 in The Spectator in response to two speeches given by Peel wherein he made many of the same proposals which Carlyle had earlier suggested; he called the speeches "like a prophecy of better things, inexpressibly cheering." In May, he published "Indian Meal", in which he advanced maize as a remedy to the Great Famine as well as the worries of "disconsolate Malthusians". He visited Ireland again with Duffy later that year while recording his impressions in his letters and a series of memoranda, published as Reminiscences of My Irish Journey in 1849 after his death; Duffy would publish his own memoir of their travels, Conversations with Carlyle.

Carlyle's travels in Ireland deeply affected his views on society, as did the Revolutions of 1848. While embracing the latter as necessary in order to cleanse society of various forms of anarchy and misgovernment, he denounced their democratic undercurrent and insisted on the need for authoritarian leaders. These events inspired his next two works, "Occasional Discourse on the Negro Question" (1849), in which he coined the term "Dismal Science" to describe political economy, and Latter-Day Pamphlets (1850). The illiberal content of these works sullied Carlyle's reputation for some progressives, while endearing him to those that shared his views. In 1851, Carlyle wrote The Life of John Sterling as a corrective to Julius Hare's unsatisfactory 1848 biography. In late September and early October, he made his second trip to Paris, where he met Adolphe Thiers and Prosper Mérimée; his account, "Excursion (Futile Enough) to Paris; Autumn 1851", was published posthumously.

In 1852, Carlyle began research on Frederick the Great, whom he had expressed interest in writing a biography of as early as 1830. He travelled to Germany that year, examining source documents and prior histories. Carlyle struggled through research and writing, telling von Ense it was "the poorest, most troublesome and arduous piece of work he has ever undertaken". In 1856, the first two volumes of History of Friedrich II. of Prussia, Called Frederick the Great were sent to the press and published in 1858. During this time, he wrote "The Opera" (1852), "Project of a National Exhibition of Scottish Portraits" (1854) at the request of David Laing, and "The Prinzenraub" (1855). In October 1855, he finished The Guises, a history of the House of Guise and its relation to Scottish history, which was first published in 1981. Carlyle made a second expedition to Germany in 1858 to survey the topography of battlefields, which he documented in Journey to Germany, Autumn 1858, published posthumously. In May 1863, Carlyle wrote the short dialogue "Ilias (Americana) in Nuce" (American Iliad in a Nutshell) on the topic of the American Civil War. Upon publication in August, the "Ilias" drew scornful letters from David Atwood Wasson and Horace Howard Furness. In the summer of 1864, Carlyle lived at 117 Marina (built by James Burton) in St Leonards-on-Sea, in order to be nearer to his ailing wife who was in possession of caretakers there.

Carlyle planned to write four volumes but had written six by the time Frederick was finished in 1865. Before its end, Carlyle had developed a tremor in his writing hand. Upon its completion, it was received as a masterpiece. He earned a sobriquet, the "Sage of Chelsea", and in the eyes of those that had rebuked his politics, it restored Carlyle to his position as a great man of letters. Carlyle was elected Lord Rector of Edinburgh University in November 1865, succeeding William Ewart Gladstone and defeating Benjamin Disraeli by a vote of 657 to 310.

=== Final years (1866–1881) ===
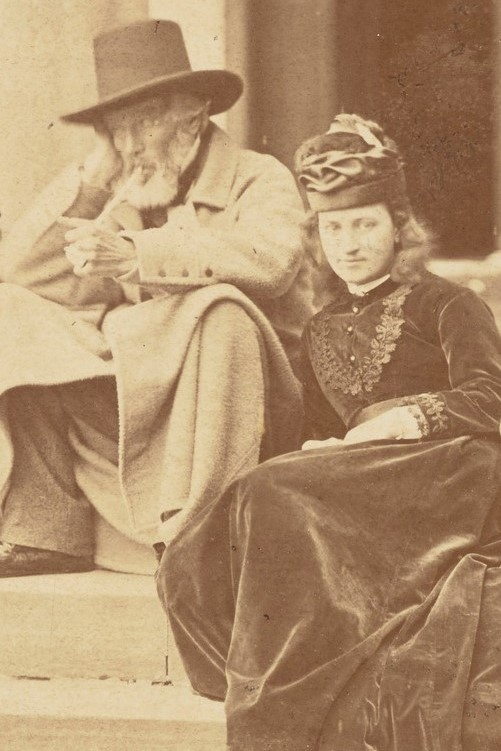
Carlyle and his niece Mary Aitken, 1874

Carlyle travelled to Scotland to deliver his "Inaugural Address at Edinburgh" as Rector in April 1866. During his trip he was accompanied by John Tyndall, Thomas Henry Huxley and Thomas Erskine. One of those that welcomed Carlyle on his arrival was Sir David Brewster, Principal of the university and the commissioner of Carlyle's first professional writings for the Edinburgh Encyclopædia. Carlyle was joined onstage by his fellow travellers, Brewster, Moncure D. Conway, George Harvey, Lord Neaves and others. Carlyle spoke extemporaneously on several subjects, concluding his address with a quote from Goethe: "Work, and despair not: Wir heissen euch hoffen, 'We bid you be of hope!'" Tyndall reported to Jane in a three-word telegram that it was "A perfect triumph." The warm reception he received in his homeland of Scotland marked the climax of Carlyle's life as a writer. While still in Scotland, Carlyle received abrupt news of Jane's sudden death in London. Upon her death, Carlyle began to edit his wife's letters and write reminiscences of her. He experienced feelings of guilt as he read her complaints about her illnesses, his friendship with Lady Harriet Ashburton, and his devotion to his labour, particularly on Frederick the Great. Although deep in grief, Carlyle remained active in public life.

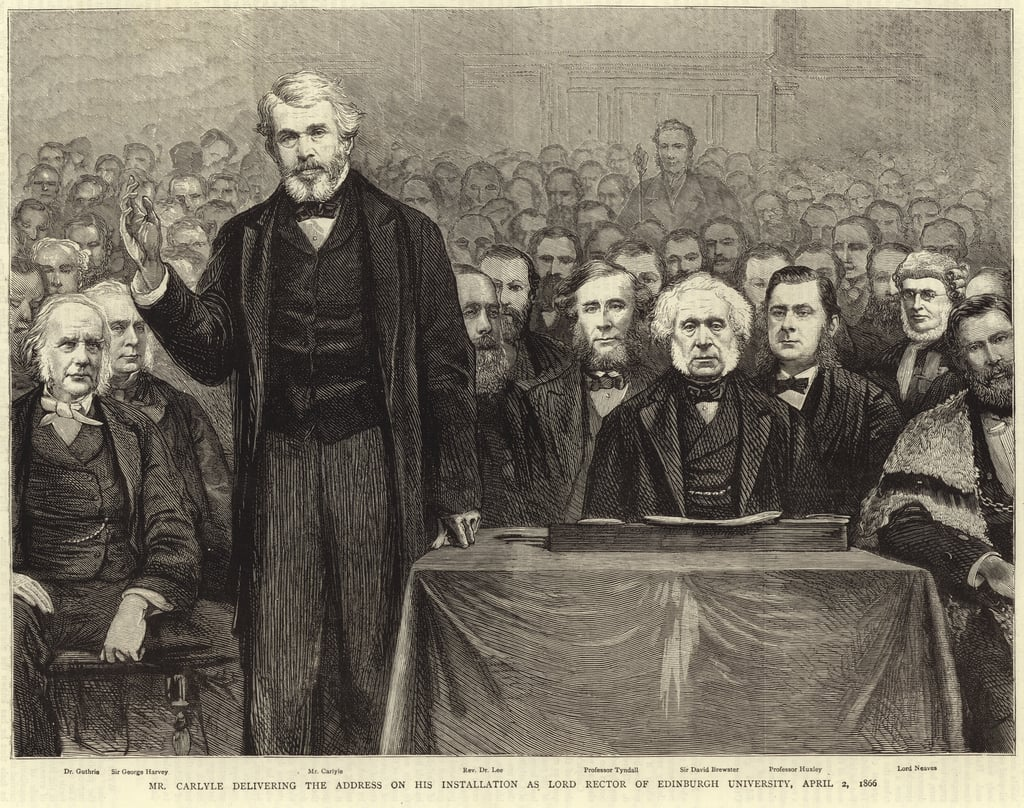
Engraving depicting the Inaugural Address

Amidst controversy over Governor John Eyre's violent repression of the Morant Bay rebellion, Carlyle assumed leadership of the Eyre Defence and Aid Fund in 1865 and 1866. The Defence had convened in response to the anti-Eyre Jamaica Committee, led by Mill and backed by Charles Darwin, Herbert Spencer and others. Carlyle and the Defence were supported by John Ruskin, Alfred, Lord Tennyson, Charles Dickens and Charles Kingsley. From December 1866 to March 1867, Carlyle resided at the home of Louisa Baring, Lady Ashburton in Menton, where he wrote reminiscences of Irving, Jeffrey, Robert Southey, and William Wordsworth. In August, he published "Shooting Niagara: And After?", an essay in response and opposition to the Second Reform Bill. In 1868 he wrote reminiscences of John Wilson and William Hamilton, and his niece Mary Aitken Carlyle moved into 5 Cheyne Row, becoming his caretaker and assisting in the editing of Jane's letters. In March 1869 he met Queen Victoria, who wrote in her journal of "Mr. Carlyle, the historian, a strange-looking eccentric old Scotchman, who holds forth, in a drawling melancholy voice, with a broad Scotch accent, upon Scotland and upon the utter degeneration of everything." In 1870 he was elected President of the London Library, and in November he wrote a letter to The Times in support of Germany in the Franco-Prussian War. His conversation was recorded by a number of friends and visitors in later years, most notably William Allingham, who became known as Carlyle's James Boswell.

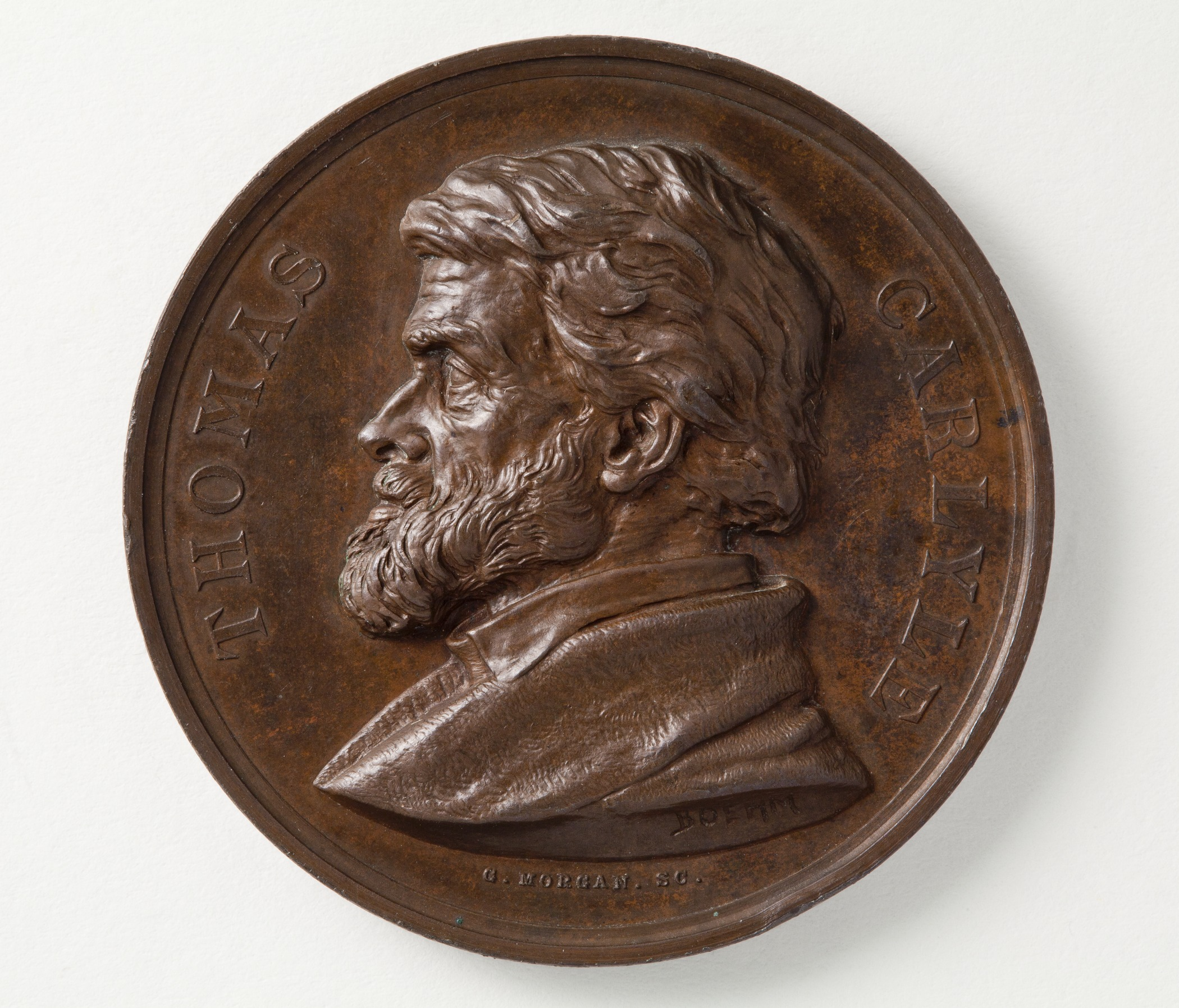
Commemoration Medal for Thomas Carlyle, front

In the spring of 1874 Carlyle accepted the Pour le Mérite für Wissenschaften und Künste from Otto von Bismarck and declined Disraeli's offers of a state pension and the Knight Grand Cross in the Order of the Bath in the autumn. On the occasion of his eightieth birthday in 1875, he was presented with a commemorative medal crafted by Sir Joseph Edgar Boehm and an address of admiration signed by 119 of the leading writers, scientists, and public figures of the day. (Note: For the letter, written by John Morley and David Masson, and list of signatories, see New Letters of Thomas Carlyle, edited by Alexander Carlyle, vol. II, pp. 323–324.) "Early Kings of Norway", a recounting of historical material from the Icelandic sagas transcribed by Mary acting as his amanuensis, and an essay on "The Portraits of John Knox" (both 1875) were his last major writings to be published in his lifetime. In November 1876, he wrote a letter in the Times "On the Eastern Question", entreating England not to enter the Russo-Turkish War on the side of the Turks. Another letter to the Times in May 1877 "On the Crisis", urging against the rumoured wish of Disraeli's to send a fleet to the Baltic Sea and warning not to provoke Russia and Europe at large into a war against England, marked his last public utterance. The American Academy of Arts and Sciences elected him a Foreign Honorary Member in 1878.

On 2 February 1881 Carlyle fell into a coma. For a moment he awakened, and Mary heard him speak his final words: "So this is Death—well ..." He thereafter lost his speech and died on the morning of 5 February. An offer of interment at Westminster Abbey, which he had anticipated, was declined by his executors in accordance with his will. He was laid to rest with his mother and father in Hoddam Kirkyard in Ecclefechan, according to old Scottish custom. His private funeral, held on 10 February, was attended by family and a few friends, including Froude, Conway, Tyndall and William Lecky, as local residents looked on.

== Works ==
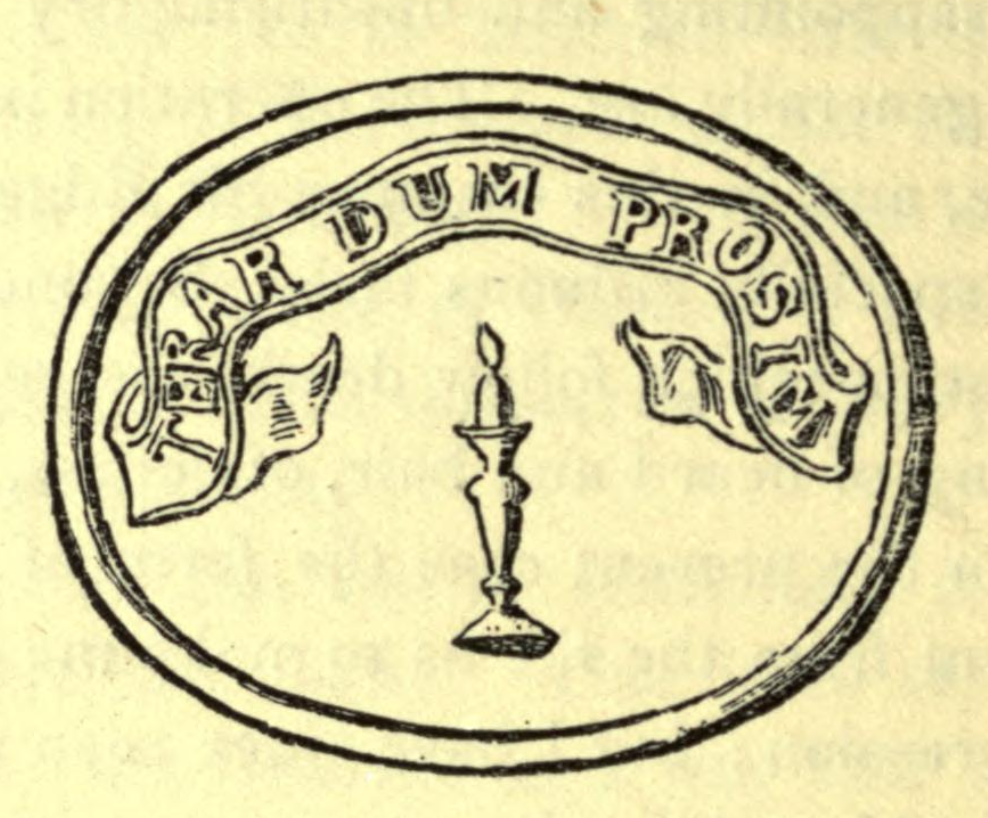
Carlyle's "Seal", sketched in 1823. Its Latin motto translates: "May I be wasted so that I be of use."

Carlyle's corpus spans the genres of "criticism, biography, history, politics, poetry, and religion." His innovative writing style, known as Carlylese, greatly influenced Victorian literature and anticipated techniques of postmodern literature.

In his philosophy, while not adhering to any formal religion, Carlyle asserted the importance of belief during an age of increasing doubt. Much of his work is concerned with the modern human spiritual condition; he was the first writer to use the expression "meaning of life". In Sartor Resartus and in his early Miscellanies, he developed his own philosophy of religion based upon what he called "Natural Supernaturalism", the idea that all things are "Clothes" which at once reveal and conceal the divine, that "a mystic bond of brotherhood makes all men one", and that duty, work and silence are essential.

Carlyle postulated the Great Man theory, a philosophy of history which contends that history is shaped by exceptional individuals. This approach to history was first promulgated in his lectures On Heroes and given specific focus in longer studies like Cromwell and Frederick the Great. He viewed history as a "Prophetic Manuscript" that progresses on a cyclical basis, analogous to the phoenix and the seasons. His historiographical method emphasises the relationship between the event at hand and all those which precede and follow it, which he makes apparent through use of the present (rather than past) tense in his French Revolution and in other histories.

Raising the "Condition-of-England Question" to address the impact of the Industrial Revolution, Carlyle's social and political philosophy is characterised by medievalism, advocating a "Chivalry of Labour" led by "Captains of Industry". In works of social criticism such as Past and Present and Latter-Day Pamphlets, he criticised utilitarianism as mere atheism and egoism, described the political economy of laissez-faire as the "Dismal Science", and rebuked "big black Democracy", while championing "Heroarchy (Government of Heroes)".

== Character ==
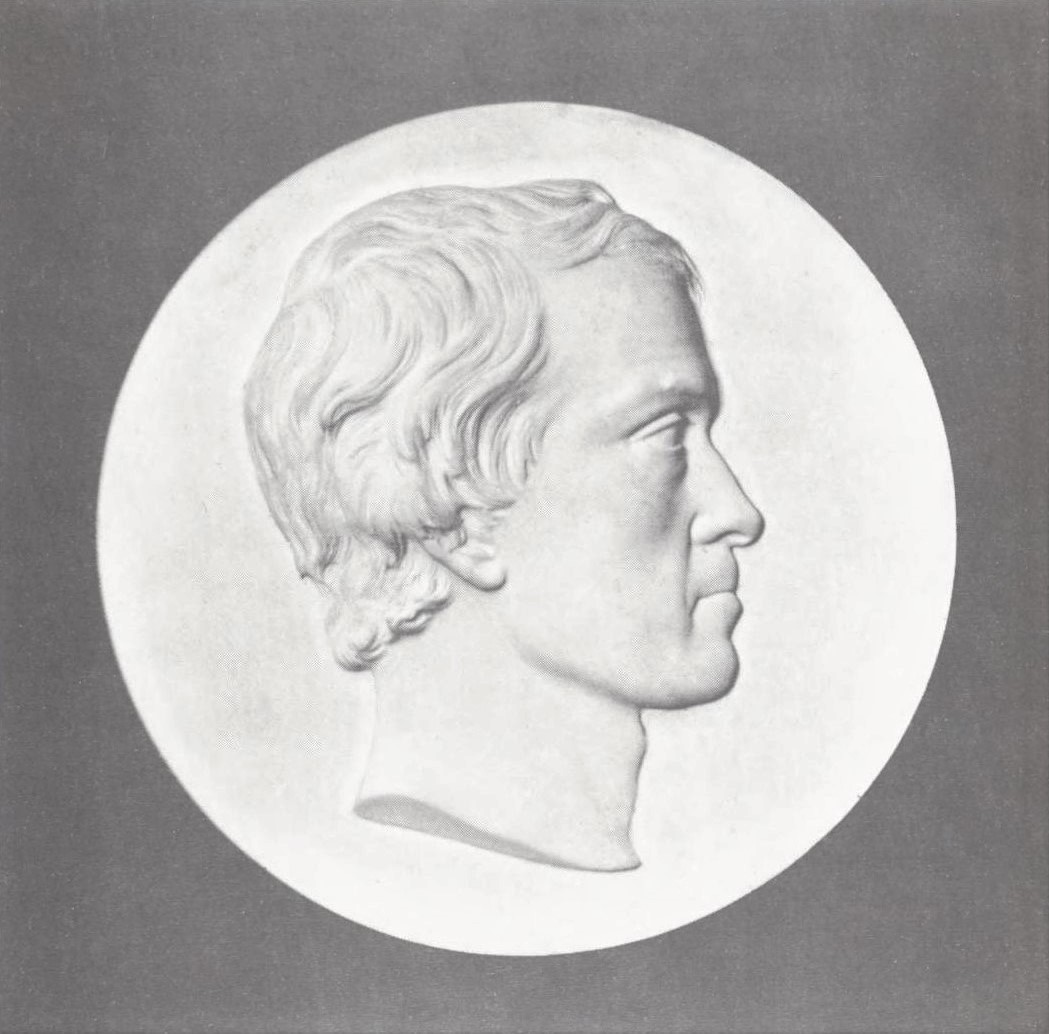
Medallion of Carlyle by Thomas Woolner, 1851. James Caw said that it recalled Lady Eastlake's description of him: "The head of a thinker, the eye of a lover, and the mouth of a peasant."

James Anthony Froude recalled his first impression of Carlyle:

He was then fifty-four years old; tall (about five feet eleven), thin, but at that time upright, with no signs of the later stoop. His body was angular, his face beardless, such as it is represented in Woolner's medallion, (Note: Pictured.) which is by far the best likeness of him in the days of his strength. His head was extremely long, with the chin thrust forward; his neck was thin; the mouth firmly closed, the under lip slightly projecting; the hair grizzled and thick and bushy. His eyes, which grew lighter with age, were then of a deep violet, with fire burning at the bottom of them, which flashed out at the least excitement. The face was altogether most striking, most impressive in every way.

He was often recognised by his wideawake hat.

Carlyle was a renowned conversationalist. Ralph Waldo Emerson described him as "an immense talker, as extraordinary in his conversation as in his writing,—I think even more so." Charles Darwin considered him "the most worth listening to, of any man I know." William Lecky noted his "singularly musical voice" which "quite took away anything grotesque in the very strong Scotch accent" and "gave it a softening or charm". Henry Fielding Dickens recollected that he was "gifted with a high sense of humour, and when he laughed he did so heartily, throwing his head back and letting himself go." Thomas Wentworth Higginson remembered his "broad, honest, human laugh", one that "cleared the air like thunder, and left the atmosphere sweet." Lady Eastlake called it "the best laugh I ever heard".

Charles Eliot Norton wrote that Carlyle's "essential nature was solitary in its strength, its sincerity, its tenderness, its nobility. He was nearer Dante than any other man." Frederic Harrison similarly observed that "Carlyle walked about London like Dante in the streets of Verona, gnawing his own heart and dreaming dreams of Inferno. To both the passers-by might have said, See! there goes the man who has seen hell". Higginson rather felt that Jean Paul's humorous character Siebenkäs "came nearer to the actual Carlyle than most of the grave portraitures yet executed", for, like Siebenkäs, Carlyle was "a satirical improvisatore". Emerson saw Carlyle as "not mainly a scholar", but "a practical Scotchman, such as you would find in any saddler's or iron-dealer's shop, and then only accidentally and by a surprising addition, the admirable scholar and writer he is."

Paul Elmer More found Carlyle "a figure unique, isolated, domineering—after Dr. Johnson the greatest personality in English letters, possibly even more imposing than that acknowledged dictator."

== Legacy ==
=== Influence ===
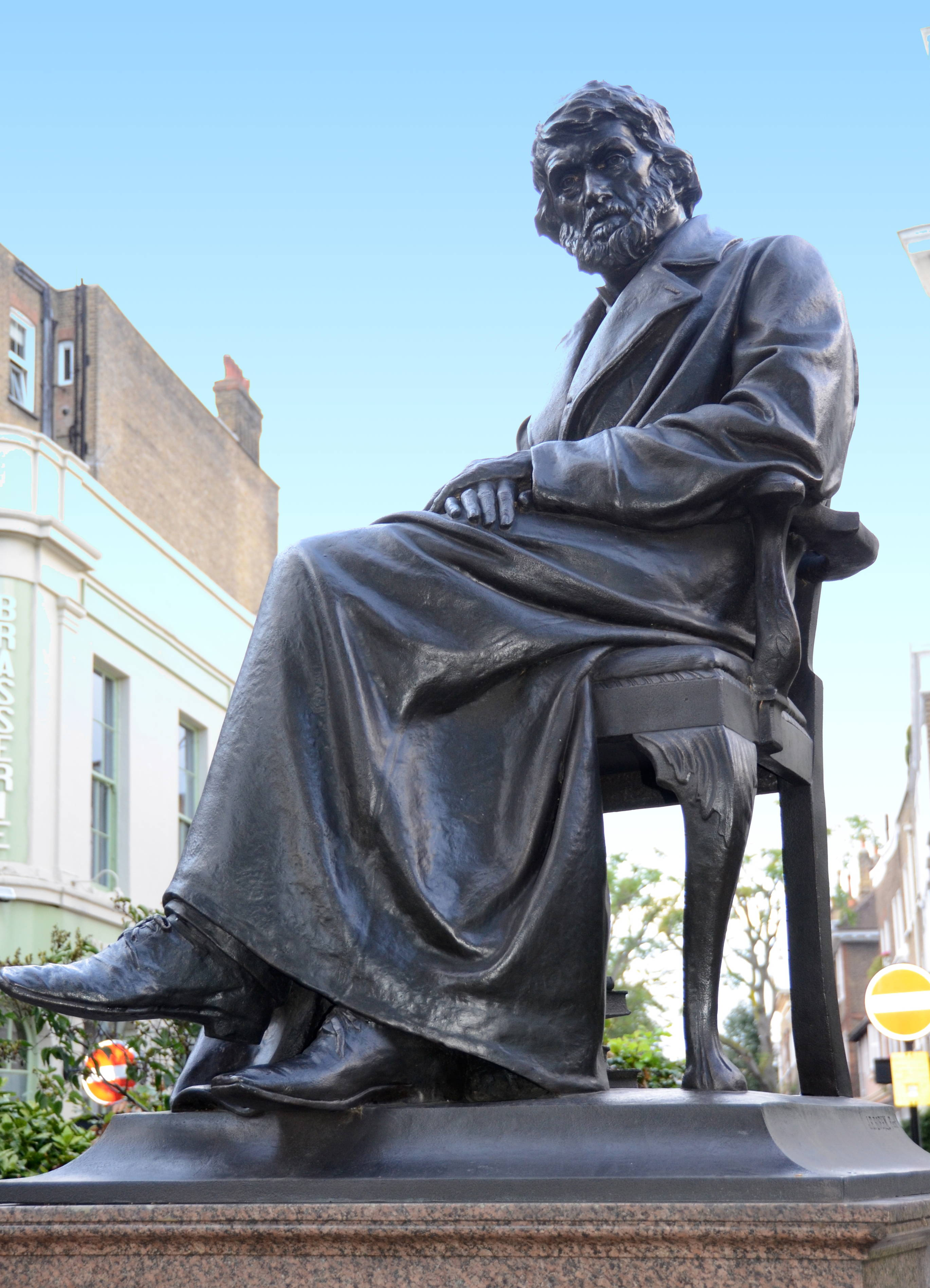
Statue of Thomas Carlyle in Chelsea

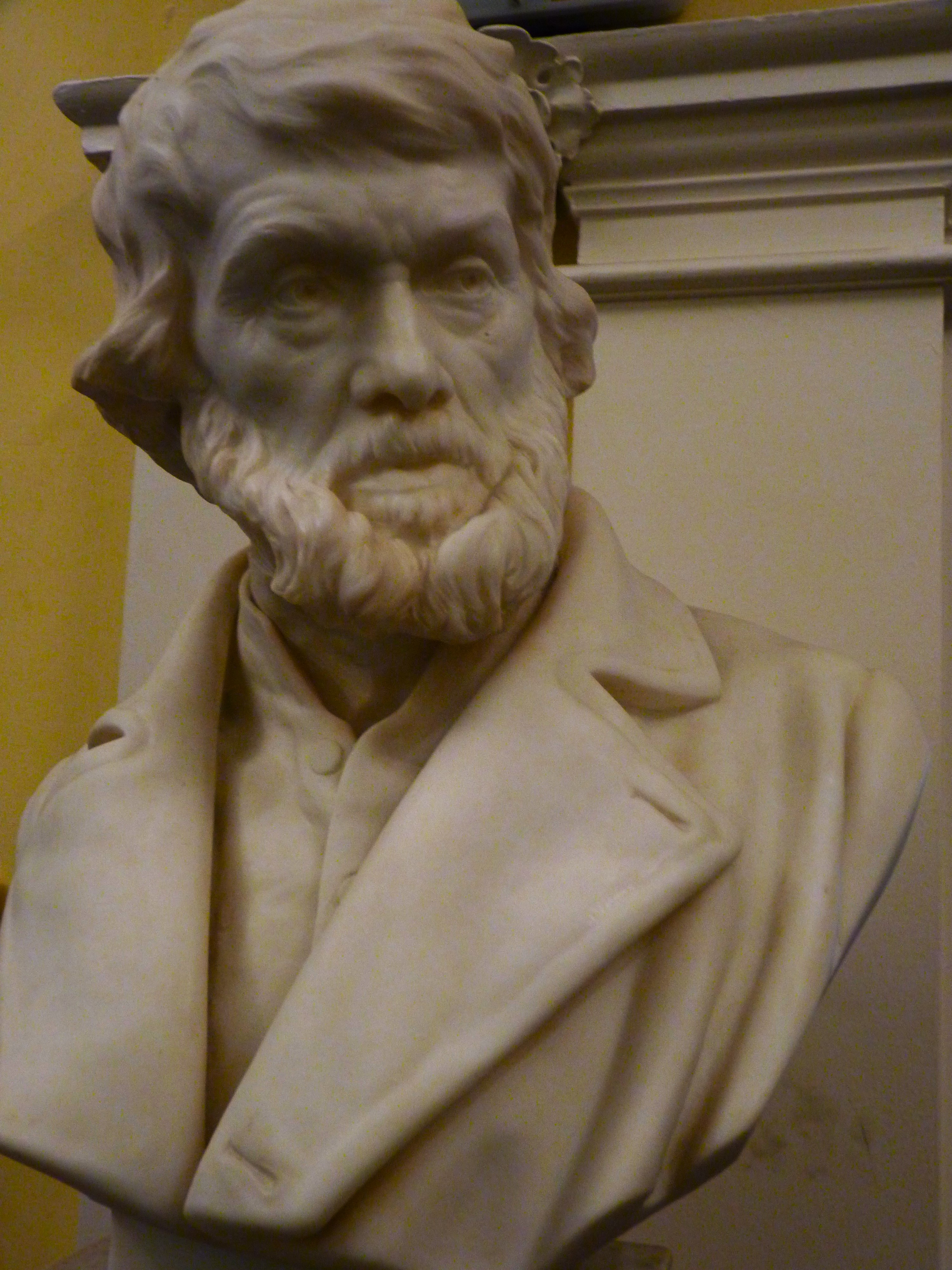
Bust of Thomas Carlyle by Mario Raggi c. 1892, displayed at Chelsea Library

George Eliot summarised Carlyle's impact in 1855:

It is an idle question to ask whether his books will be read a century hence: if they were all burnt as the grandest of Suttees on his funeral pile, it would be only like cutting down an oak after its acorns have sown a forest. For there is hardly a superior or active mind of this generation that has not been modified by Carlyle's writings; there has hardly been an English book written for the last ten or twelve years that would not have been different if Carlyle had not lived.

Carlyle's two most important followers were Emerson and Ruskin. In the 19th century, Emerson was often thought of as "the American Carlyle", and he described himself in 1870 as "Lieutenant" to Carlyle's "General in Chief". Ruskin publicly acknowledged that Carlyle was the author to whom he "owed more than to any other living writer", and would frequently refer to him as his "master", writing after Carlyle's death that he was "throwing myself now into the mere fulfilment of Carlyle's work".

The British philosopher J. H. Muirhead wrote that in his rejection of philosophical scepticism and embrace of German idealism, Carlyle "exercised an influence in England and America that no other did upon the course of philosophical thought of his time".

==== Literature ====
"The most explosive impact in English literature during the nineteenth century is unquestionably Thomas Carlyle's", writes Lionel Stevenson. "From about 1840 onward, no author of prose or poetry was immune from his influence." By 1960 he had become "the single most frequent topic of doctoral dissertations in the field of Victorian literature". While preparing for a study of his own, the German scholar Gerhart von Schulze-Gävernitz found himself overwhelmed by the amount of material already written about Carlyle—in 1894.

Authors on whom Carlyle's influence was particularly strong include Matthew Arnold, Elizabeth Barrett Browning, Robert Browning, Arthur Hugh Clough, Dickens, Disraeli, George Eliot, Elizabeth Gaskell, Frank Harris, Kingsley, George Henry Lewes, David Masson, George Meredith, Mill, Margaret Oliphant, Luigi Pirandello, Marcel Proust, Ruskin, George Bernard Shaw and Walt Whitman. Germaine Brée has shown the considerable impact that Carlyle had on the thought of André Gide. Carlylean influence is also seen in the writings of Ryūnosuke Akutagawa, Leopoldo Alas, Marcu Beza, Jorge Luis Borges, the Brontës, Arthur Conan Doyle, Antonio Fogazzaro, E. M. Forster, Ángel Ganivet, Lafcadio Hearn, William Ernest Henley, Marietta Holley, Rudyard Kipling, Selma Lagerlöf, Herman Melville, Alfredo Panzini, Edgar Quinet, Samuel Smiles, Tokutomi Sohō, Lord Tennyson, William Makepeace Thackeray, Anthony Trollope, Miguel de Unamuno, Alexandru Vlahuță and Vasile Voiculescu.

Carlyle's German essays and translations as well as his own writings were pivotal to the development of the English Bildungsroman. His concept of symbols influenced French literary Symbolism. The Victorian specialist Alice Chandler writes that the influence of his medievalism is "found throughout the literature of the Victorian age".

Carlyle's influence was also felt in the negative sense. Algernon Charles Swinburne, whose comments on Carlyle throughout his writings range from high praise to scathing critique, once wrote to John Morley that Carlyle was "the illustrious enemy whom we all lament", reflecting a view of Carlyle as a totalising figure to be rebelled against.

Despite the broad Modernist reaction against the Victorians, the influence of Carlyle has been traced in the writings of T. S. Eliot, James Joyce, Wyndham Lewis and D. H. Lawrence.

The Oxford English Dictionary credits Carlyle with the first quotation in 547 separate entries, the 45th-highest of all English-language authors.

==== Social and political movements ====
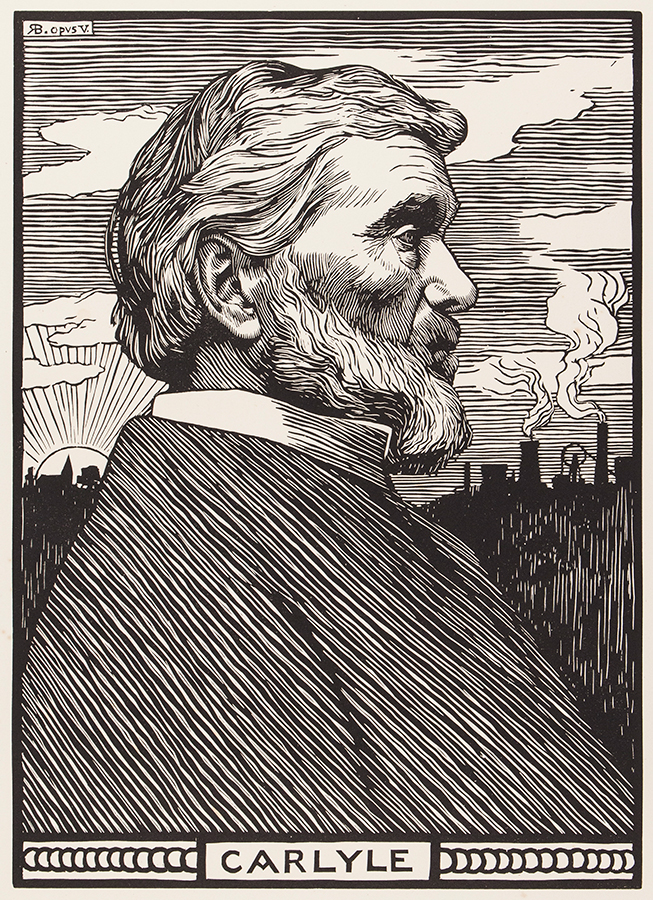
"Never had political progressivism a foe it could more heartily respect" (Walt Whitman). Woodcut by Robert Bryden, 1901

Politically, Carlyle's influence spans across ideologies, from conservatism and nationalism to communism. He is acknowledged as an essential influence on Young England conservatism, Christian socialism, and the fin de siècle labour movement. His work is referenced in the writings of a diverse range of political writers, including Karl Marx and Friedrich Engels, Mahatma Gandhi, and Richard Wagner. The prominent Young Ireland nationalist John Mitchel and the Antebellum South secessionist George Fitzhugh were both deeply influenced by Carlyle. Jamshedji Tata, the prominent Indian industrialist and philanthropist who founded the Tata Group, India's largest conglomerate company, was influenced by Carlyle. Many social reformers were inspired by him, including Octavia Hill, Emmeline Pankhurst, Jane Addams, W. E. B. Du Bois and Martin Luther King Jr. More recently figures associated with neoreaction and the alt-right have claimed Carlyle as an influence, notably Curtis Yarvin, Jonathan Bowden and Kerry Bolton.

Scholars have been divided on whether Carlyle himself was conservative: Herbert Tingsten and Richard Reeves argue that he was, while Simon Heffer claims that he was not.

==== Art ====
Carlyle's medievalist critique of industrial practice and political economy was an early utterance of what would become the spirit of both the Pre-Raphaelite Brotherhood and the Arts and Crafts movement, and several leading members recognised his importance. John William Mackail, a friend and the official biographer of William Morris, wrote that in the years of Morris and Edward Burne-Jones attendance at the University of Oxford, Past and Present stood as "inspired and absolute truth." Morris read a letter from Carlyle at the first public meeting of the Society for the Protection of Ancient Buildings. Fiona MacCarthy, a recent biographer, affirmed that Morris was "deeply and lastingly" indebted to Carlyle. William Holman Hunt considered Carlyle to be a mentor of his. He used Carlyle as one of the models for the head of Christ in The Light of the World and showed great concern for Carlyle's portrayal in Ford Madox Brown's painting Work (1865). Carlyle helped Thomas Woolner to find work early in his career and throughout, and he would become "a kind of surrogate son" to the Carlyles, referring to Carlyle as "the dear old philosopher". Phoebe Anna Traquair depicted Carlyle, one of her favourite writers, in murals painted for the Royal Hospital for Sick Children and St Mary's Cathedral in Edinburgh. According to Marylu Hill, the Roycrofters were "very influenced by Carlyle's words about work and the necessity of work", with his name appearing frequently in their writings, which are held at Villanova University.

Thackeray wrote that Carlyle had done more than any other to give "art for art's sake ... its independence." Roberts explains that Carlyle "did much to set the stage for the Aesthetic Movement" through both his German and original writings, noting that he even popularised (if not introduced) the term "Æesthetics" into the English language, leading her to declare him as "the apostle of aesthetics in England, 1825–27." Carlyle's rhetorical style and his views on art also provided a foundation for aestheticism, particularly that of Walter Pater, Wilde and W. B. Yeats.

== Controversies ==
=== Froude controversy ===
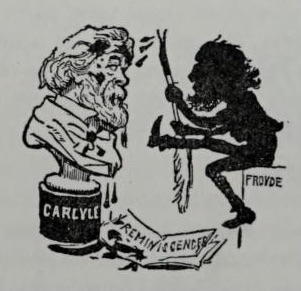
"Froude besmirching Carlyle", illustration from Punch's Almanac, 31 December 1881

Carlyle had entrusted his papers to the care of James Anthony Froude after his death but was unclear about the permissions granted to him. Froude edited and published the Reminiscences in 1881, which sparked controversy due to Froude's failure to excise comments that might offend living persons, as was common practice at the time. The book damaged Carlyle's reputation, as did the following Letters and Memorials of Jane Welsh Carlyle and the four-volume biography of life as written by Froude. The image that Froude presented of Carlyle and his marriage was highly negative, prompting new editions of the Reminiscences and the letters by Charles Eliot Norton and Alexander Carlyle (husband of Carlyle's niece, Mary Carlyle Aitken), who argued that, among other things, Froude had mishandled the materials entrusted to him in a deliberate and dishonest manner. This argument overshadowed Carlyle's work for decades. Owen Dudley Edwards remarked that by the turn of the century, "Carlyle was known more than read". As Campbell describes:

The effect of Froude’s work in the years following Carlyle’s death was extraordinary. Almost overnight, it seemed, Carlyle plunged from his position as Sage of Chelsea and Grand Old Victorian to the object of puzzled dislike, or even of revulsion.

=== Racism and antisemitism ===
Fielding writes that Carlyle "was often ready to play up to being a caricature of prejudice". Targets for his ire included the French, the Irish, Slavs, Turks, Americans, Catholics, and, most explicitly, black people and Jews. According to Duffy, when he charged Carlyle with having "taught [John] Mitchel to oppose the liberation of the negroes and the emancipation of the Jews", Carlyle replied:

Mitchel ... would be found to be right in the end; the black man could not be emancipated from the laws of nature, which had pronounced a very decided decree on the question, and neither could the Jew.

In his biography of Carlyle, Fred Kaplan suggests that Carlyle "resembled most of his contemporaries" in his beliefs about Jews, identifying them with capitalist materialism and outmoded religious orthodoxy. Throughout the late 1840s, Carlyle privately pondered the need for England to make an "Exodus from Houndsditch", and to discard "Hebrew Old-Clothes" in religion. In June 1861, Charles Dickens reported to William Macready that "Carlyle has greatly intensified his aversion to Jews, and is greatly enraged by beholding the gradual rise of a Mansion that Rothschild is building next the Duke of Wellington's." Dickens recounted Carlyle's vision of Queen Victoria summoning Rothschild before her and threatening to pull the teeth out of his "Mosaic head" unless he repaid his "millions of ill gotten Money". Carlyle had once considered writing a book called Exodus from Houndsditch, (Note: Houndsditch is a mercantile district in the East End of London that was associated with Jewish merchants of used clothing.) "a pealing off of fetid Jewhood in every sense from myself and my poor bewildered brethren". Froude described Carlyle's aversion to the Jews as "Teutonic". He felt they had contributed nothing to the "wealth" of mankind, contrasting "the Jews with their morbid imaginations and foolish sheepskin Targums" with "The Norse with their steel swords guided by fresh valiant hearts and clear veracious understanding". Carlyle refused an invitation by Baron Rothschild in 1848 to support a Bill in Parliament to allow voting rights for Jews in the United Kingdom, asking Richard Monckton Milnes in a correspondence how a Jew could "try to be Senator, or even Citizen, of any Country, except his own wretched Palestine", and expressed his hope that they would "arrive" in Palestine "as soon as possible".

Carlyle argued that slavery was preferable to laissez-faire capitalism. Henry Crabb Robinson heard Carlyle at dinner in 1837 speak approvingly of slavery. "It is a natural aristocracy, that of colour, and quite right that the stronger and better race should have dominion!" The 1853 pamphlet "Occasional Discourse on the Negro Question" expressed concern for the excesses of the practice, considering "How to abolish the abuses of slavery, and save the precious thing in it." Carlyle's defences of slavery contributed to his enduring popularity among pro-slavery figures of the antebellum South. But liberals in Britain and the American North disputed such arguments, and among the objectors was the abolitionist John Stuart Mill, in the anonymous essay "The Negro Question".

In the modern era, the London Library has removed its bust of Carlyle from public display, and states that "Carlyle's racist views are completely unacceptable and the London Library does not share them."

=== Prussianist and Nazi appropriation ===
From Goethe's recognition of Carlyle as "a moral force of great importance" in 1827 to the celebration of his centennial as though he were a national hero in 1895, Carlyle had long enjoyed a high reputation in Germany. Passages from Frederick were even part of the curriculum in German schools. Carlyle's support of Bismarck and the Silesian Wars led to suspicion during the First World War that he would have supported the German Empire and its leaders (such as Theobald von Bethmann Hollweg and Gottlieb von Jagow). Allied nations largely regarded Carlyle as a Prussianist, the "spiritual brother of Clausewitz and Treitschke." Prussian statesmen had identified Carlyle's "gospel of force" with their doctrine of Weltmacht oder Untergang (World Power or Downfall) in order to "make their own side respectable." Herbert L. Stewart defended Carlyle's memory by arguing that besides a shared opposition to democracy, his belief that "Right makes Might" (Note: In his journal, Carlyle wrote that "right is the eternal symbol of might", and described himself thus: "never [was there] a son of Adam more contemptuous of might except where it rests on the above origin.") is "far removed" from "the ethic of militarism", and his "Puritan Theodicy" has nothing to do with the "Immoralism of German Kriegsherren" (Warlords).

With the rise of Adolf Hitler, many agreed with the assessment of K. O. Schmidt in 1933, who came to see Carlyle as den ersten englischen Nationalsozialisten (the first English National Socialist). William Joyce (founder of the National Socialist League and the Carlyle Club, a cultural arm of the NSL named for Carlyle) wrote of how "Germany has repaid him for his scholarship on her behalf by honouring his philosophy when it is scorned in Britain." German academics viewed him as having been immersed in and an outgrowth of German culture, just as National Socialism was. They proposed that Heroes and Hero-Worship justified the Führerprinzip (Leadership principle). Theodor Jost wrote in 1935: "Carlyle established, in fact, the mission of the Führer historically and philosophically. He fights, himself a Führer, vigorously against the masses, he ... becomes a pathfinder for new thoughts and forms." Parallels were also drawn between Carlyle's critique of Victorian England in Latter-Day Pamphlets and Nazi opposition to the Weimar Republic.

Some believed that Carlyle was German by blood. Echoing Paul Hensel's earlier claim in 1901 that Carlyle's Volkscharakter (Folk character) had preserved "the peculiarity of the Low German tribe", Egon Friedell, an anti-Nazi and Jewish Austrian, explained in 1935 that Carlyle's affinity with Germany stemmed from his being "a Scotsman of the lowlands, where the Celtic imprint is far more marginal than it is with the High Scottish and the Low German element is even stronger than it is in England." Others regarded him, if not ethnically German, as a Geist von unserem Geist (Spirit from our Spirit), as Karl Richter wrote in 1937: "Carlyle's ethos is the ethos of the Nordic soul par excellence."

In 1945 Joseph Goebbels frequently sought consolation from Carlyle's History of Frederick the Great. Goebbels read passages from the book to Hitler during his last days in the Führerbunker in the Battle of Berlin. While some Germans were eager to claim Carlyle for the Reich, others were more aware of incompatibilities. In 1936 Theodor Deimel argued that because of the "profound difference" between Carlyle's philosophical foundation of "a personally shaped religious idea" and the Völkisch foundation of National Socialism, the designation of Carlyle as the "first National Socialist" is "mistaken". Ernst Cassirer rejected the notion of Carlyle as proto-fascist in The Myth of the State (1946), emphasizing the moral underpinning of his thought. G. B. Tennyson has also commented that Carlyle's anti-modernist and anti-egoist stances disqualify him from association with 20th-century totalitarianism.

== Bibliography ==
=== By Carlyle ===
==== Major works ====
The standard edition of Carlyle's works is the Works in Thirty Volumes, also known as the Centenary Edition. The date given is when the work was "originally published."

- Traill, Henry Duff, ed. (1896–1899). The Works of Thomas Carlyle in Thirty Volumes. London: Chapman and Hall.
  - Vol. I. Sartor Resartus: The Life and Opinions of Herr Teufelsdröckh in Three Books (1831)
  - Vols. II–IV. The French Revolution: A History (1837)
  - Vol. V. On Heroes, Hero-Worship, and the Heroic in History (1841)
  - Vols. VI–IX. Oliver Cromwell's Letters and Speeches: with Elucidations (1845)
  - Vol. X. Past and Present (1843)
  - Vol. XI. The Life of John Sterling (1851)
  - Vols. XII–XIX. History of Friedrich II. of Prussia, Called Frederick the Great (1858–1865)
  - Vol. XX. Latter-Day Pamphlets (1850)
  - Vols. XXI–XXII. German Romance: Translations from the German, with Biographical and Critical Notices (1827)
  - Vols. XXIII–XXIV. Wilhelm Meister's Apprenticeship and Travels, Translated from the German of Goethe (1824)
  - Vol. XXV. The Life of Friedrich Schiller, Comprehending an Examination of His Works (1825)
  - Vols. XXVI–XXX. Critical and Miscellaneous Essays

==== Marginalia ====
This is a list of selected books, pamphlets and broadsides uncollected in the Miscellanies through 1880 as well as posthumous first editions and unpublished manuscripts.

- Ireland and Sir Robert Peel (1849)
- Legislation for Ireland (1849)
- Ireland and the British Chief Governor (1849)
- Froude, James Anthony, ed. (1881). Reminiscences. London: Longmans, Green, and Co.
- Reminiscences of My Irish Journey in 1849 (1882). London: Sampson Low, Marston, Searle & Rivington.
- Last Words of Thomas Carlyle: On Trades-Unions, Promoterism and the Signs of the Times (1882). 67 Princes Street, Edinburgh: William Paterson.
- Norton, Charles Eliot, ed. (1883). The Correspondence of Thomas Carlyle and Ralph Waldo Emerson. Boston: James R. Osgood and Company.
- Norton, Charles Eliot, ed. (1886). Early Letters of Thomas Carlyle. London and New York: Macmillan and Co.
- Thomas Carlyle's Counsels to a Literary Aspirant: A Hitherto Unpublished Letter of 1842 and What Came of Them (1886). Edinburgh: James Thin, South Bridge.
- Norton, Charles Eliot, ed. (1887). Reminiscences. London and New York: Macmillan and Co.
- Norton, Charles Eliot, ed. (1887). Correspondence Between Goethe and Carlyle. London and New York: Macmillan and Co.
- Norton, Charles Eliot, ed. (1888). Letters of Thomas Carlyle. London and New York: Macmillan and Co.
- Thomas Carlyle on the Repeal of the Union (1889). London: Field & Tuer, the Leadenhall Press.
- Newberry, Percy, ed. (1892). Rescued Essays of Thomas Carlyle. The Leadenhall Press.
- Last Words of Thomas Carlyle (1892). London: Longmans, Green, and Co.
- Karkaria, R. P., ed. (1892). Lectures on the History of Literature. London: Curwen, Kane & Co.
- Greene, J. Reay, ed. (1892). Lectures on the History of Literature. London: Ellis and Elvey.
- Carlyle, Alexander, ed. (1898). Historical Sketches of Notable Persons and Events in the Reigns of James I and Charles I. London: Chapman and Hall Limited.
- Norton, Charles Eliot, ed. (1898). Two Note Books of Thomas Carlyle. New York: The Grolier Club.
- Copeland, Charles Townsend, ed. (1899). Letters of Thomas Carlyle to His Youngest Sister. Boston and New York: Houghton, Mifflin and Company.
- Jones, Samuel Arthur, ed. (1903). Collecteana. Canton, Pennsylvania: The Kirgate Press.
- Carlyle, Alexander, ed. (1904). New Letters of Thomas Carlyle. London: The Bodley Head.
- Carlyle, Alexander, ed. (1909). The Love Letters of Thomas Carlyle and Jane Welsh. 2 vols. London: The Bodley Head.
- Carlyle, Thomas (1922). "Notes of a Three-Days' Tour to the Netherlands". Cornhill Magazine. Vol. 53. pp. 626–640.
- Carlyle, Alexander, ed. (1923). Letters of Thomas Carlyle to John Stuart Mill, John Sterling and Robert Browning. London: T. Fisher Unwin LTD.
- Brooks, Richard Albert Edward, ed. (1940). Journey to Germany, Autumn 1858. New Haven: Yale University Press.
- Graham Jr., John, ed. (1950). Letters of Thomas Carlyle to William Graham. Princeton: Princeton University Press.
- Shine, Hill, ed. (1951). Carlyle's Unfinished History of German Literature. Lexington: University of Kentucky Press.
- Bliss, Trudy, ed. (1953). Letters to His Wife. London: Victor Gollancz Ltd.
- King, Marjorie P. (1954). ""Illudo Chartis": An Initial Study in Carlyle's Mode of Composition". The Modern Language Review. 49 (2): 164–175. doi:10.2307/3718901. ISSN 0026-7937. JSTOR 3718901.
- Baumgarten, Murray (1968). "Carlyle and "Spiritual Optics"". Victorian Studies. 11 (4): 503–522. ISSN 0042-5222. JSTOR 3825228.
- Marrs, Edwin W. Jr., ed. (1968). The Letters of Thomas Carlyle to His Brother Alexander: with Related Family Letters. Cambridge, Massachusetts: The Belknap Press of Harvard University Press.
- Clubbe, John, ed. (1974). Two Reminiscences of Thomas Carlyle. Durham, N.C.: Duke University Press. ISBN 978-0822303077.
- Fielding, K.J. (1979). "Unpublished Manuscripts – I: Carlyle Among the Cannibals". Carlyle Newsletter (1): 22–28. ISSN 0269-8226. JSTOR 44945570.
- Henderson, Heather, ed. (1979). Wooden-Headed Publishers and Locust-Swarms of Authors. University of Edinburgh.
- Campbell, Ian, ed. (1980). Thomas and Jane: Selected Letters from the Edinburgh University Library Collection. Edinburgh.
- Fielding, K.J. (1980). "Unpublished Manuscripts – II: Carlyle's Scenario for 'Cromwell'". Carlyle Newsletter (2): 6–13. ISSN 0269-8226. JSTOR 44945576.
- Kaplan, Fred (1980). "'Phallus-Worship' (1848): Unpublished Manuscripts – III: A Response to the Revolution of 1848". Carlyle Newsletter (2): 19–23. ISSN 0269-8226. JSTOR 44945578.
- Carlyle, Thomas (1981). "The Guises". Victorian Studies. 25 (1): 13–80. ISSN 0042-5222. JSTOR 3827058.
- Trela, D. J. (1984). "Carlyle and the Beautiful People: An Unpublished Manuscript". Carlyle Newsletter (5): 36–41. ISSN 0269-8226. JSTOR 44937838.
- Tarr, Rodger L.; McClelland, Fleming, eds. (1986). The Collected Poems of Thomas and Jane Welsh Carlyle. Greenwood, Florida: The Penkevill Publishing Company.
- Fielding, K. J. (1991). "Carlyle Writes Local History: 'Dumfries-Shire Three Hundred Years Ago'". Carlyle Annual (12): 3–7. ISSN 1050-3099. JSTOR 44945533.
- Fielding, K. J.; Neuberg, J. (1992). "New Notes for 'The Letters': I. Carlyle's Sketch of Joseph Neuberg II. 'Leave it Alone; Time Will Mend It'". Carlyle Annual (13): 3–15. ISSN 1050-3099. JSTOR 44945549.
- de L. Ryals, Clyde (1995). "Thomas Carlyle on the Mormons: An Unpublished Essay". Carlyle Studies Annual (15): 49–54. ISSN 1074-2670. JSTOR 44946088.
- Campbell, Ian (1 January 1996). "Peter Lithgow: New Fiction by Thomas Carlyle". Studies in Scottish Literature. 29 (1). ISSN 0039-3770.
- Hubbard, Tom (2005), "Carlyle, France and Germany in 1870", in Hubbard, Tom (2022), Invitation to the Voyage: Scotland, Europe and Literature, Rymour, pp. 44–46, ISBN 978-1739596002

==== Scholarly editions ====
- Altick, Richard D., ed. (2000). Past and Present (Reprint ed.). New York: New York University Press.
- Cate, George Allen, ed. (1982). The Correspondence of Thomas Carlyle and John Ruskin. Stanford, California: Stanford University Press.
- Fielding, Kenneth J.; Campbell, Ian, eds. (2009). Reminiscences (Reprint ed.). Glasgow: Kennedy & Boyd.
- Goldberg, M. K.; Seigel, J. P., eds. (1983). Carlyle's Latter-Day Pamphlets. Canadian Federation for the Humanities.
- McSweenery, Kerry; Sabor, Peter, eds. (2008). Sartor Resartus. Oxford World's Classics. Oxford: Oxford University Press.
- Sanders, Charles Richard; Fielding, Kenneth J.; Ryals, Clyde de L.; Campbell, Ian; Christianson, Aileen; Clubbe, John; McIntosh, Sheila; Smith, Hilary; Sorensen, David, eds. (1970–2022). The Collected Letters of Thomas and Jane Welsh Carlyle. Durham, North Carolina: Duke University Press.
  - Kinser, Brent E. (ed.). "The Carlyle Letters Online: A Victorian Cultural Reference".
- Slater, Joseph, ed. (1964). The Correspondence of Emerson and Carlyle. New York and London: Columbia University Press.
- Sorensen, David R.; Kinser, Brent E., eds. (2023). Past and Present. Oxford World's Classics. Oxford: Oxford University Press. ISBN 978-0198841081.
- Sorensen, David R.; Kinser, Brent E.; Engel, Mark, eds. (2019). The French Revolution. Oxford World's Classics. Oxford: Oxford University Press.
- The Norman and Charlotte Strouse Edition of the Writings of Thomas Carlyle. 8 vols. Berkeley and Los Angeles: University of California Press. 1993–2024.

=== Memoirs, etc. ===
- Allingham, William (1990) [1907]. Allingham, H.; Radford, D. (eds.). The Diaries. London: The Folio Society.
- Allingham, William (2000) [1907]. William Allingham's Diary 1847–1889 (Paperback ed.). London: Centaur Press.
- Baker, William (1 January 1976). "Herbert Spencer's unpublished reminiscences of Thomas Carlyle: The 'Perfect owl of minerva for knowledge' on a 'Poet without music'". Neophilologus. 60 (1): 145–152. doi:10.1007/BF01513592. ISSN 1572-8668. S2CID 161087774.
- Blunt, Reginald (1895). The Carlyles' Chelsea Home, being some account of No. 5, Cheyne Row. York Street, Covent Garden, London: George Bell and Sons.
- Boyle, Mary (1902). "Carlyle". In Boyle, Sir Courtenay (ed.). Her Book. London: John Murray. pp. 267–268.
- Conway, Moncure D. (1881). Thomas Carlyle. London: Chatto & Windus.
- Duffy, Sir Charles Gavan (1892). Conversations with Carlyle. New York: Charles Scribner's Sons.
- Espinasse, Francis (1893). Literary Recollections and Sketches. London: Hodder and Stoughton.
- Fox, Caroline (1883). Pym, Horace N. (ed.). Memories of Old Friends: Being Extracts from the Journals and Letters of Caroline Fox of Penjerrick, Cornwall, from 1835 to 1871. London: Smith, Elder & Co.
- Higginson, Thomas Wentworth (1909). "Carlyle's Laugh". Carlyle's Laugh, and Other Surprises. Boston and New York: Houghton Mifflin Company. pp. 1–12.
- Knighton, William (1881). "Conversations with Carlyle". Contemporary Review (39): 904–920.
- Larkin, Henry (1881). "Carlyle, and Mrs. Carlyle: A Ten-Years' Reminiscence". The British Quarterly Review (74): 84–64.
- Masson, David (1885). Carlyle Personally and in His Writings.
- Norton, Charles Eliot (1886). "Recollections of Carlyle". The New Princeton Review. 2 (4): 1–19.
- Tyndall, John (1892) [1890]. "Personal Recollections of Thomas Carlyle". New Fragments. New York: Appleton. pp. 347–391.
- Symington, Andrew J. (1886). Some Personal Reminiscences of Carlyle.
- The Westminster Gazette. The Homes and Haunts of Thomas Carlyle, 1895.

=== Biographies ===
- Ashton, Rosemary (2002). Thomas & Jane Carlyle: Portrait of a Marriage. London: Chatto & Windus.
- Boyle, Andrew, ed. (1913–1914). "Carlyle, Thomas". The Everyman Encyclopædia. Everyman's library Reference. Vol. Three. London: J. M. Dent & Sons, LTD. pp. 325–327.
- Campbell, Ian (24 June 2011) [1974]. Thomas Carlyle (2nd Revised ed.). Glasgow, Scotland: Kennedy & Boyd.
- Campbell, Ian (1987). "Thomas Carlyle". Dictionary of Literary Biography. Gale. Archived from the original on 24 October 2019.
- Fischer, Thomas A. (1882). Thomas Carlyle (in German).
- Froude, James Anthony (1882–1884). Thomas Carlyle. 4 vols. London: Longmans, Green, and Co.
- Garnett, Richard (1887). Life of Thomas Carlyle.
- Heffer, Simon (1996). Moral Desperado: A Life of Thomas Carlyle. London: Weidenfeld & Nicolson.
- Kaplan, Fred (1983). Thomas Carlyle: A Biography. Ithaca: Cornell University Press.
- Morrow, John (2006). Thomas Carlyle. New York: Hambledon Continuum. ISBN 978-1852855444.
- Neff, Emery (1932). Carlyle. New York: W. W. Norton & Company, Inc.
- Nichol, John (1904). Thomas Carlyle.
- Perry, Bliss (1915). Thomas Carlyle: How to Know Him. Indianapolis: The Bobbs-Merrill Company.
- Shepherd, Richard Herne (1881). Memoirs of the Life and Writings of Thomas Carlyle.
- Shine, Hill (1953). Carlyle's Early Reading, to 1834. Occasional Contributions. Vol. 57. Lexington: University of Kentucky Libraries.
- Sloan, J. M. (20 May 2010) [1904]. Hollern, Mary (ed.). The Carlyle Country (2nd ed.). Sheffield, England: The Grimsay Press.
- Stephen, Leslie (1887). "Carlyle, Thomas (1795–1881)" . Dictionary of National Biography. Vol. 09. pp. 111–127.
- Symons, Julian (1952). Thomas Carlyle: The Life and Ideas of a Prophet. New York: Oxford University Press.
- Wilson, David Alec (1923–1934). Carlyle. 6 vols. London: Kegan Paul, Trench, Trubner & Co., LTD.
- Wylie, William Howie (1881). Thomas Carlyle, the Man and His Books. London.

=== Secondary sources ===
- Barfoot, C. C., ed. (1999). Victorian Keats and Romantic Carlyle: The Fusions and Confusions of Literary Periods. Amsterdam & Atlanta, GA: Rodopi. ISBN 9042005785.
- Birrell, Augustine (1885). "Carlyle". Obiter Dicta. New York: Chas. Scribner's Sons.
- Bishirjian, Richard J. (1976). "Carlyle's Political Religion". The Journal of Politics. 38 (1): 95–113. doi:10.2307/2128963. JSTOR 2128963. S2CID 153527096.
- Campell, Ian (1987). "Thomas Carlyle (1795–1881)". In Thesing, William B. (ed.). Victorian Prose Writers Before 1867. Dictionary of Literary Biography. Vol. 55. Detroit: Gale. pp. 46–64. ISBN 978-0810317338.
- Chandler, Alice (1970). A Dream of Order: The Medieval Ideal in Nineteenth-Century English Literature. Lincoln: University of Nebraska Press. ISBN 978-0803207042.
- Clubbe, John, ed. (1976). Carlyle and His Contemporaries: Essays in Honor of Charles Richard Sanders. Durham, North Carolina: Duke University Press. ISBN 978-0822303404.
- Cole, J. A. (1964). Lord Haw-Haw: The Full Story of William Joyce. London: Faber and Faber. ISBN 978-0571148608.
- Cumming, Mark, ed. (2004). The Carlyle Encyclopedia. Madison and Teaneck, NJ: Fairleigh Dickinson University Press. ISBN 978-0838637920.
- Drescher, Horst W., ed. (1983). Thomas Carlyle 1981: Papers Given at the International Thomas Carlyle Centenary Symposium. Scottish Studies. Frankfurt am Main: Lang. ISBN 978-3820473278.
- Dyer, Isaac Watson (1968) [1928]. A Bibliography of Thomas Carlyle's Writings and Ana. New York: Burt Franklin.
- Fielding, K. J.; Tarr, Rodger L., eds. (1976). Carlyle Past and Present: A Collection of New Essays. Vision Press. ISBN 978-0854783731.
- Harrold, Charles Frederick (1934). Carlyle and German Thought: 1819–1834. New Haven: Yale University Press.
- Jackson, Holbrook (1948). Dreamers of Dreams: The Rise and Fall of 19th Century Idealism. New York: Farrar, Straus and Company.
- Jessop, Ralph (1997). Carlyle and Scottish Thought. Macmillan Press.
- Joyce, William (1940). Twilight Over England. Berlin: Internationaler Verlag.
- Kerry, Paul E.; Hill, Marylu, eds. (2010). Thomas Carlyle Resartus: Reappraising Carlyle's Contribution to the Philosophy of History, Political Theory, and Cultural Criticism. Madison and Teaneck, NJ: Fairleigh Dickinson University Press. ISBN 978-0838642238.
- Kerry, Paul E.; Pionke, Albert D.; Dent, Megan, eds. (2018). Thomas Carlyle and the Idea of Influence. Madison and Teaneck, NJ: Fairleigh Dickinson University Press. ISBN 978-1683930662.
- LaValley, Albert J. (1968). Carlyle and the Idea of the Modern: Studies in Carlyle's Prophetic Literature and Its Relation to Blake, Nietzsche, Marx, and Others. New Haven and London: Yale University Press. ISBN 978-0300006766.
- Lea, F. A. (2017) [1943]. Carlyle: Prophet of To-day. Routledge Library Editions: Social and Political Thought in the Nineteenth Century. Vol. 2. Routledge. doi:10.4324/9781315563640. ISBN 978-1315563640.
- McCollum, Jonathon C. (20 July 2007). Thomas Carlyle, Fascism, and Frederick: From Victorian Prophet to Fascist Ideologue (MA thesis). Brigham Young University. hdl:1877/etd2044.
- Mendilow, Jonathan (1983). "The Neglected (I): Carlyle's Political Philosophy: Towards a Theory of Catch-All Extremism". Government and Opposition. 18 (1): 68–87. doi:10.1111/j.1477-7053.1983.tb00341.x. JSTOR 44483466. S2CID 145617742.
- Mendilow, Jonathan (1984). "Carlyle, Marx & the ILP: Alternative Routes to Socialism". Polity. 17 (2). The University of Chicago Press: 225–247. doi:10.2307/3234506. JSTOR 3234506. S2CID 147550498.
- Moldbug, Mencius (5 April 2016). Moldbug on Carlyle. Unqualified Reservations. ASIN B01DVJCCBQ.
- Moore, Carlisle (1966) [1957]. "Thomas Carlyle". In Houtchens, Carolyn Washburn; Houtchens, Lawrence Huston (eds.). The English Romantic Poets & Essayists: A Review of Research and Criticism (Revised ed.). New York: New York University Press.
- Norman, Edward (1987). The Victorian Christian Socialists. Cambridge: Cambridge University Press.
- Pierson, Stanley (1979). British Socialists: The Journey from Fantasy to Politics. Cambridge, Massachusetts: Harvard University Press. ISBN 978-0674082823.
- Plotz, John (2000). "Crowd Power: Chartism, Carlyle, and the Victorian Public Sphere". Representations. 70 (70): 87–114. doi:10.2307/2902894. JSTOR 2902894.
- Rosenberg, John D. (1985). Carlyle and the Burden of History. Cambridge, Mass.: Harvard University Press.
- Rosenberg, Philip (1974). The Seventh Hero: Thomas Carlyle and the Theory of Radical Activism. Cambridge, Mass.: Harvard University Press.
- Sanders, Charles Richard (1977). Carlyle's Friendships and Other Studies. Durham, N.C.: Duke University Press. ISBN 978-0822303893.
- Seigel, Jules Paul, ed. (1971). Thomas Carlyle: The Critical Heritage. The Critical Heritage Series. London: Routledge & Kegan Paul. ISBN 978-0710070906.
- Shepherd, Richard Herne (1881). The Bibliography of Carlyle. London: Elliot Stock.
- Shine, Hill (1971). Carlyle and the Saint-Simonians; the concept of historical periodicity. New York: Octagon Books. ISBN 978-0374973605.
- Sorensen, David R. (1 March 2009). "'Natural Supernaturalism': Carlyle's Redemption of the Past in The French Revolution". Revue LISA/LISA e-journal. Littératures, Histoire des Idées, Images, Sociétés du Monde Anglophone – Literature, History of Ideas, Images and Societies of the English-speaking World. VII (3): 442–451. doi:10.4000/lisa.132. ISSN 1762-6153.
- Sorensen, David R. (2012). "'The Great Pioneer of National Socialist Philosophy?': Carlyle and Twentieth-Century Totalitarianism". Studies in the Literary Imagination. 45 (1): 43–66. doi:10.1353/sli.2012.0000. ISSN 2165-2678. S2CID 153751576.
- Sorensen, David; Kinser, Brent E. (11 January 2018). "Thomas Carlyle". Oxford Bibliographies. doi:10.1093/OBO/9780199799558-0037.
- Tarr, Rodger L. (1976). Thomas Carlyle: A Bibliography of English Language Criticism, 1824–1974. Charlottesville: University Press of Virginia. ISBN 978-0813906959.
- Tarr, Rodger L. (1989). Thomas Carlyle: A Descriptive Bibliography. Pittsburgh Series in Bibliography. Pittsburgh: University of Pittsburgh Press. ISBN 978-0822936077.
- Tennyson, G. B. (1965). Sartor Called Resartus: The Genesis, Structure, and Style of Thomas Carlyle's First Major Work. Princeton, New Jersey: Princeton University Press. LCCN 65017162.
- Tennyson, G. B. (1973). "Thomas Carlyle". In DeLaura, David J. (ed.). Victorian Prose: A Guide to Research. New York: The Modern Language Association of America. pp. 33–104. ISBN 978-0873522502.
- Trela, D. J.; Tarr, Rodger L., eds. (1997). The Critical Response to Thomas Carlyle's Major Works. Critical Responses in Arts and Letters. Westport, Conn.: Greenwood Press. ISBN 978-0313291074.
- Vanden Bossche, Chris R. (1991). Carlyle and the Search for Authority. Columbus: Ohio State University Press.
- Vida, Elizabeth M. (1993). Romantic Affinities: German Authors and Carlyle; A Study in the History of Ideas. Heritage. University of Toronto Press. ISBN 978-1487573270. JSTOR 10.3138/j.ctvfrxchd.
- Vijn, J. P. (2017). Carlyle, Jung, and Modern Man: Jungian Concepts as Key to Carlyle's Mind (PDF). H. Brinkman-Vijn. Archived from the original (PDF) on 13 December 2022.
- Wellek, René (1965). Confrontations: studies in the intellectual and literary relations between Germany, England, and the United States during the nineteenth century. Princeton, N.J.: Princeton University Press.
- Young, Louise Merwin (1971). Thomas Carlyle and the Art of History. New York: Octagon Books. ISBN 978-0374988418.

== Explanatory notes ==
Academic offices
| Preceded by William Ewart Gladstone | Rector of the University of Edinburgh; 1865–1868 | Succeeded by James Moncreiff |
