= Natural Supernaturalism =

Philosophical concept developed by Thomas Carlyle

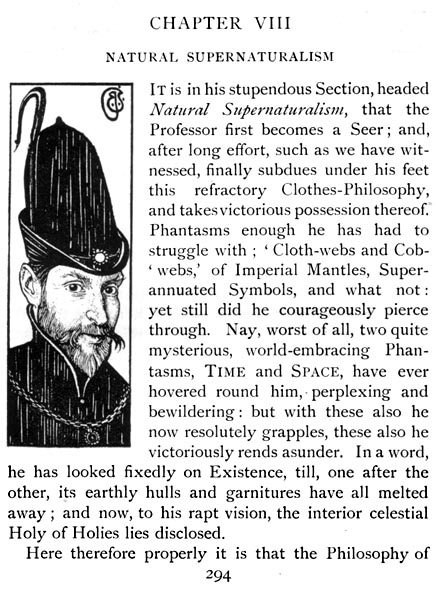
Title page of "Natural Supernaturalism" from the 1898 edition of Sartor Resartus with illustrations by E. J. Sullivan

Natural Supernaturalism is one of Thomas Carlyle's philosophical concepts. It derives from the name of a chapter in his novel Sartor Resartus (1833–34) in which it is a central tenet of Diogenes Teufelsdröckh's "Philosophy of Clothes". Natural Supernaturalism holds that "existence itself is miraculous, that life contains elements of wonder that can never be defined or eradicated by physical science."

Carlyle conceived of Natural Supernaturalism as a "new Mythus" consistent with the discoveries of modern science. Rather than regarding a miracle as "simply a violation of the Laws of Nature", Natural Supernaturalism is based on the idea that nature (and its laws) is itself miraculous, being "of quite infinite depth, of quite infinite expansion". Rodger L. Tarr writes that "According to natural supernaturalism, miracles are an extension of truth, not a corruption of it; mysteries are dimensions of science, not a repudiation of it; and wonder is the foundation of logic, not its antagonist."

In The Nuttall Encyclopaedia, Natural Supernaturalism is interpreted as "the supernatural found latent in the natural, and manifesting itself in it, or of the miraculous in the common and everyday course of things . . . a recognition at bottom, as the Hegelian philosophy teaches, and the life of Christ certifies, of the finiting of the infinite in the transitory forms of space and time."

== Carlyle's "great Message" ==
Carlyle thought of Natural Supernaturalism as a corrective to the errors of the Enlightenment, as his journal entry for 13 February 1833 shows:

That the Supernatural differs not from the Natural is a great truth, which the last century (especially in France) has been engaged in demonstrating. The Philosophes went far wrong, however, in this, that instead of raising the Natural to the Supernatural, they strove to sink the Supernatural to the Natural. The gist of my whole way of thought is to do not the latter but the former.

His journal entry for 31 March 1833 reiterated his conviction in the importance of this idea:

Neither fear thou that this thy great Message (of the Natural being the Supernatural) will wholly perish unuttered. One way or other it will and shall be uttered[.] Write it down on Paper any way; speak it from thee; so shall thy painful, destitute Existence not have been in vain.

Carlyle wrote a piece dated 15 and 16 November 1852, which James Anthony Froude edited and published as "Spiritual Optics" in his biography of Carlyle. In it, Carlyle wrote of

an altogether (totally) new (or hitherto unconceived) species of divineness, a divineness lying much nearer home than formerly. A divineness that does not come from Judea from Olympus, Asgard, Mt. Meru; but is in man himself, in the heart of every living man.

The old "divineness" Carlyle speaks of is theism, which he compares to the Ptolemaic model, while Natural Supernaturalism is compared to the Copernican model. Just as the Copernican system superseded the Ptolemaic, Natural Supernaturalism represents "a 'revolution' [in 'our spiritual world'] such as never was before, or at least since letters and recorded history existed among us never was."

== Influence ==
Carlyle's theory of Natural Supernaturalism was highly influential on British idealism. James Hutchison Stirling said that the chapter "contains the very first word of a higher philosophy as yet spoken in Great Britain, the very first English word towards the restoration and rehabilitation of the dethroned Upper Powers." Ralph Waldo Emerson and Henry David Thoreau, two admirers of Carlyle, were also inspired by it. It therefore contributed greatly to American Transcendentalism.

The term has been used in a literary context (notably by M. H. Abrams) to discuss the work of Margaret Oliphant, Elizabeth Gaskell, the Brontë family, E. M. Forster, Eric Pankey and William Shakespeare.

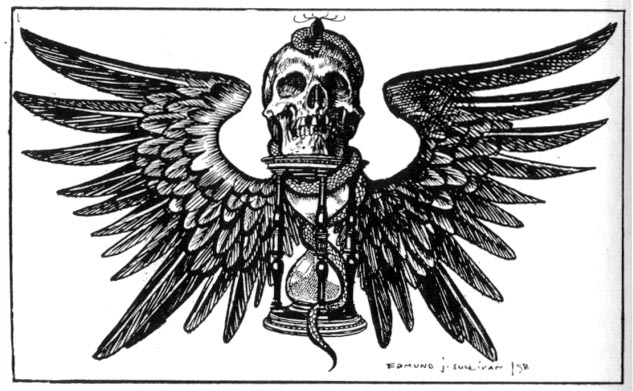
"Time and Death", Sullivan's tailpiece to chapter VIII

== Criticism ==
The natural supernatural[ism] hypothesis rejects physical aseity studies, specifically any autocaused (self-caused) logical mechanism and prerequisites for nature's creation. Still the natural supernatural (the -ism is the ideas about it) would require some foundations with specific criteria because nature isn't arbitrary and its probabilistic nature is unpredictable outcomes within a logical range of permissible states and particle arrangements.

== See also ==
- Pantheism
- Religious naturalism
- Tao

== Bibliography ==
- Abrams, M. H. (Meyer Howard) (1971). Natural supernaturalism; tradition and revolution in romantic literature. Internet Archive. New York, Norton. ISBN 978-0-393-04305-1.
- Baumgarten, Murray (1968). "Carlyle and "Spiritual Optics"". Victorian Studies. 11 (4): 503–522. ISSN 0042-5222. JSTOR 3825228.
- Caldwell, Janis McLarren, ed. (2004), "Natural supernaturalism in Thomas Carlyle and Richard Owen", Literature and Medicine in Nineteenth-Century Britain: From Mary Shelley to George Eliot, Cambridge Studies in Nineteenth-Century Literature and Culture, Cambridge: Cambridge University Press, pp. 46–67, doi:10.1017/cbo9780511484742.003, ISBN 978-0-521-84334-8
- Jordan, Alexander (2019-09-20). "The Contribution of Thomas Carlyle to British Idealism, c. 1880–1930". Scottish Historical Review. 98: 439–468. doi:10.3366/shr.2019.0428. S2CID 204477593.
- Kinser, Brent E. (ed.). "The Carlyle Letters Online: A Victorian Cultural Reference".
- Tarr, Rodger L. (2004). "Natural Supernaturalism". In Cumming, Mark (ed.). The Carlyle Encyclopedia. Madison and Teaneck, NJ: Fairleigh Dickinson University Press. p. 345. ISBN 978-0-8386-3792-0.
- Vijn, Dr. J. P. (2017). Carlyle, Jung, and Modern Man: Jungian Concepts as Key to Carlyle's Mind (PDF). H. Brinkman-Vijn.
