= Sartor Resartus =

1831 Scottish novel

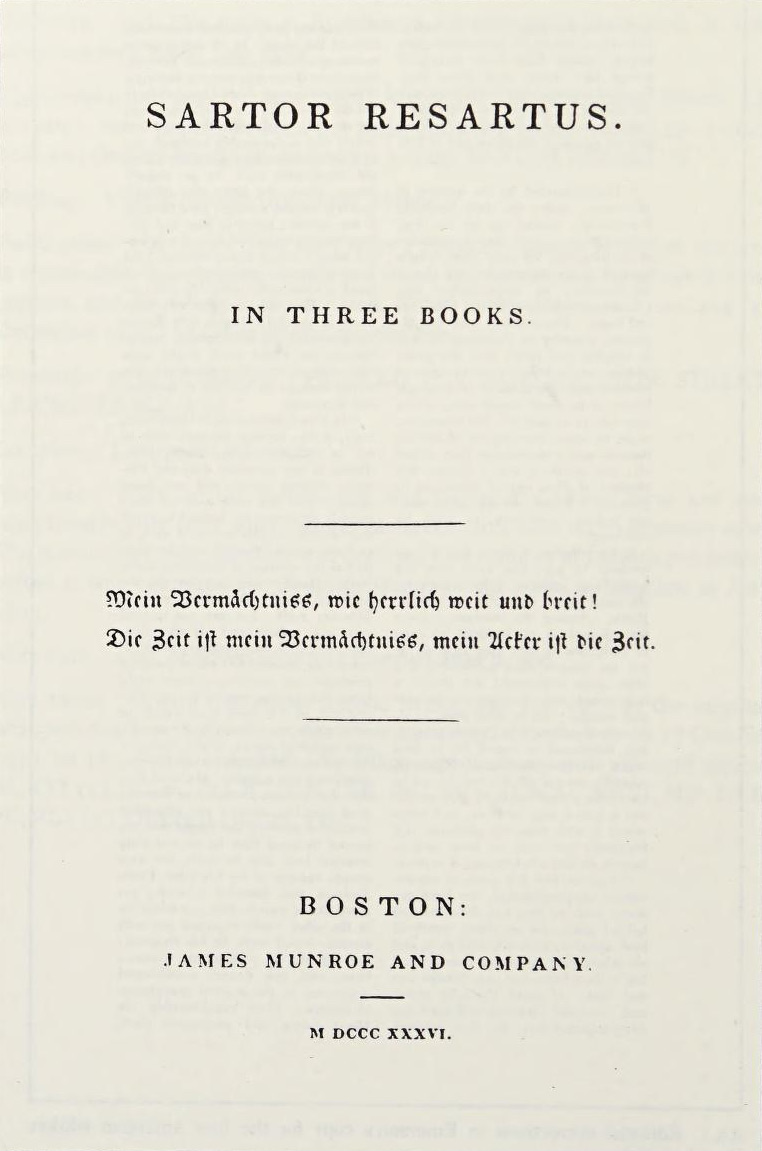
- Title page of the first edition (1836)
- Author: Thomas Carlyle
- Language: English
- Genre: Comic novel, sui generis
- Publisher: Fraser's Magazine
- Publication date: 1833–1834
- Publication place: Great Britain

Sartor Resartus: The Life and Opinions of Herr Teufelsdröckh in Three Books is a novel by the Scottish essayist, historian and philosopher Thomas Carlyle, first serialised in Fraser's Magazine from November 1833 to August 1834. It purports to be a commentary on the thought and early life of a German philosopher called Diogenes Teufelsdröckh (which translates as 'Zeus-born Devil's-dung'), author of a tome entitled Clothes: Their Origin and Influence. Teufelsdröckh's transcendentalist musings are mulled over by a skeptical English Reviewer (referred to as Editor) who also provides fragmentary biographical material on the philosopher. The work is a parody, in part of Georg Wilhelm Friedrich Hegel and more generally of German idealism.

== Background ==
Archibald MacMechan surmised that the novel's invention had three literary sources. The first of these was A Tale of a Tub by Jonathan Swift, whom Carlyle intensely admired in his college years, even going by the nicknames "Jonathan" and "The Dean". In that work, the three main traditions of Western Christianity are represented by a father bestowing his three children with clothes they may never alter, but proceed to do so according to fashion. Carlyle's second influence, according to MacMechan, was his own work in translating works by Johann Wolfgang von Goethe, particularly Wilhelm Meister's Apprenticeship, The Sorrows of Young Werther, and Faust, all of which Carlyle quotes and explicitly refers to, especially when Teufelsdröckh names his own crisis "The Sorrows of Young Teufelsdröckh". The third major influence was Laurence Sterne's Tristram Shandy, from which Carlyle quotes many phrases, and to which he had referred in earlier letters.

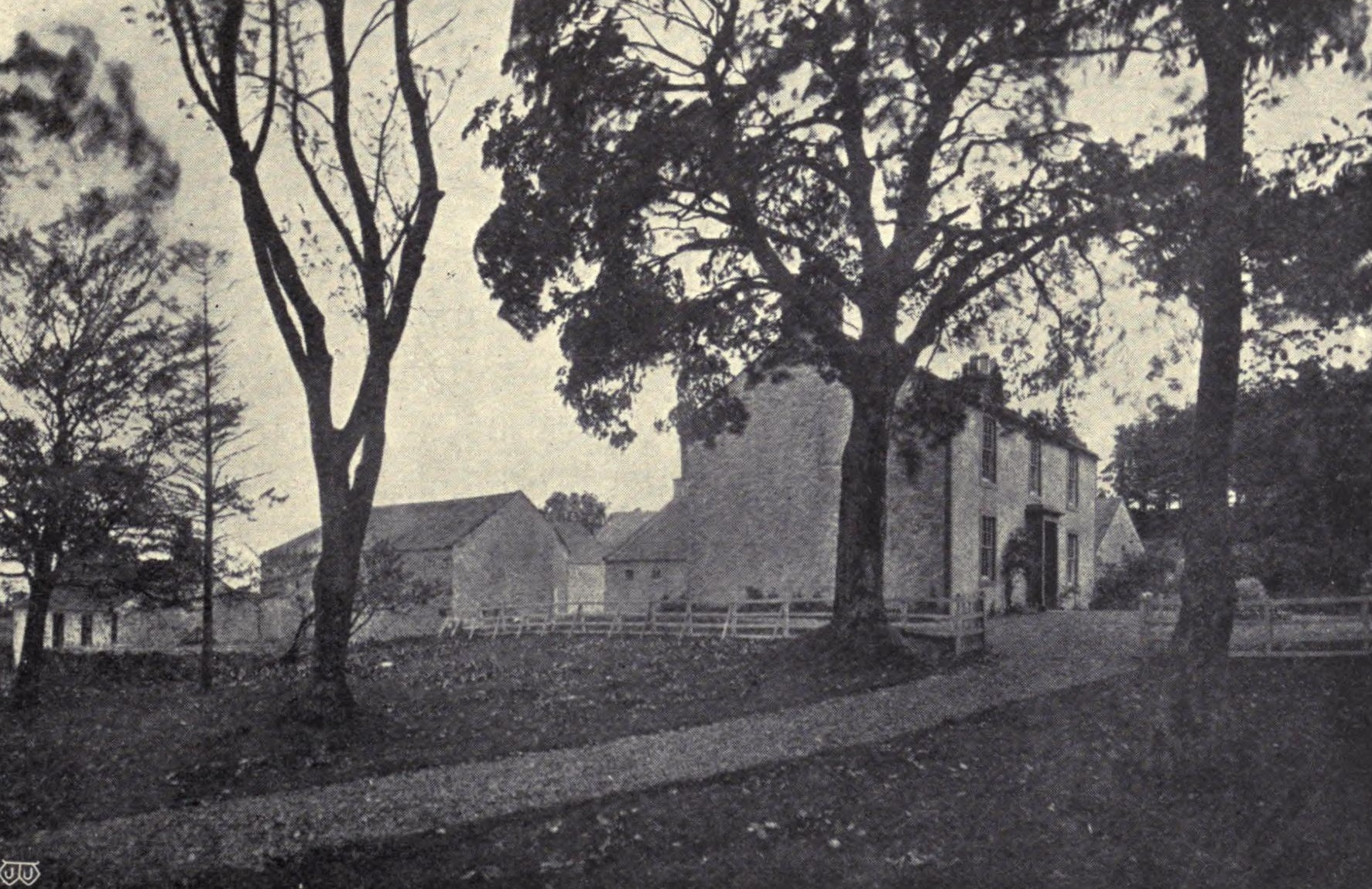
Craigenputtock House

Carlyle worked on an earlier novel, Wotton Reinfred, which MacMechan refers to as "[t]he first draft of Sartor." Carlyle finished seven chapters of the semi-autobiographical novel depicting a young man of deeply religious upbringing being scorned in love, and thereafter wandering. He eventually finds at least philosophical consolation in a mysterious stranger named Maurice Herbert, who invites Wotton into his home and frequently discusses speculative philosophy with him. At this point, the novel abruptly shifts to highly philosophical dialogue revolving mostly around Immanuel Kant. Though the unfinished novel deeply impressed Carlyle's wife Jane, (née Welsh) Carlyle never published it and its existence was forgotten until long after Carlyle's death. MacMechan suggests that the novel provoked Carlyle's frustration and scorn due to the "zeal for truth and his hatred for fiction" he speaks of in his letters of the time. Numerous parts of Wotton appear in the biographical section of Sartor Resartus, where Carlyle humorously turns them into Teufelsdröckh's autobiographical sketches, which the Editor constantly complains are overly fragmented or derivative of Goethe. Though widely and erroneously reported as having been burned by Carlyle, the unfinished novel is still extant in draft form; several passages were moved verbatim to Sartor Resartus, but with their context radically changed.

Carlyle had difficulty finding a publisher for the novel, and he began composing it as an article in October 1831 at Craigenputtock. Fraser's Magazine serialised it in 1833–1834. The text first appeared in volume form in Boston, United States, in 1836, its publication arranged by the philosopher Ralph Waldo Emerson, who much admired the book and Carlyle. Emerson's savvy dealing with the overseas publishers ensured Carlyle received high compensation, which the novel did not attain in Britain. The first British edition was published in London in 1838.

== Title ==
"Sartor Resartus" is usually translated as "The Tailor Re-tailored"; it has also been rendered as "The Tailor Repatched", "The Tailor Patched", "The Clothes Volume Edited", and as "The Tailor Made Whole Again".

There is a song called "The Taylor Done Over" which was published in London in 1785. It has been suggested that a Scottish variant was popular in Carlyle's day and may have inspired his choice of title. Another source might have been Lord Byron's play The Deformed Transformed (1824). The play, based on Goethe's Faust, was admired by Goethe, who was a friend and mentor of Carlyle, and Carlyle referenced Byron in his writings from the late 1820s.

== Plot ==
The novel takes the form of a long review by a somewhat cantankerous unnamed Editor for the English publication Fraser's Magazine (in which the novel was first serialised without any distinction of the content as fictional) who is, upon request, reviewing the fictional German book Clothes, Their Origin and Influence by the fictional philosopher Diogenes Teufelsdröckh (Professor of "Things in General" at Weissnichtwo—i.e., "Know-not-where"—University). The Editor is clearly flummoxed by the book, first struggling to explain it in the context of contemporary social issues in England, some of which he knows Germany to be sharing, then conceding that he knows Teufelsdröckh personally, but that even this relationship does not explain the curiosities of the book's philosophy. The Editor remarks that he has sent requests to Teufelsdröckh's office in Germany for more biographical information, hoping for further explanation, and the remainder of Book One contains summaries of Teufelsdröckh's book, including translated quotations, accompanied by the Editor's many objections, many of them buttressed by quotations from Goethe and William Shakespeare. The review becomes longer and longer due to the Editor's frustration at the philosophy, and his desire to expose its outrageous nature. At the final chapter of Book One, the Editor has received a reply from Teufelsdröckh's office in the form of several bags of paper scraps (rather esoterically organised according to the signs of the Zodiac) on which are written autobiographical fragments.

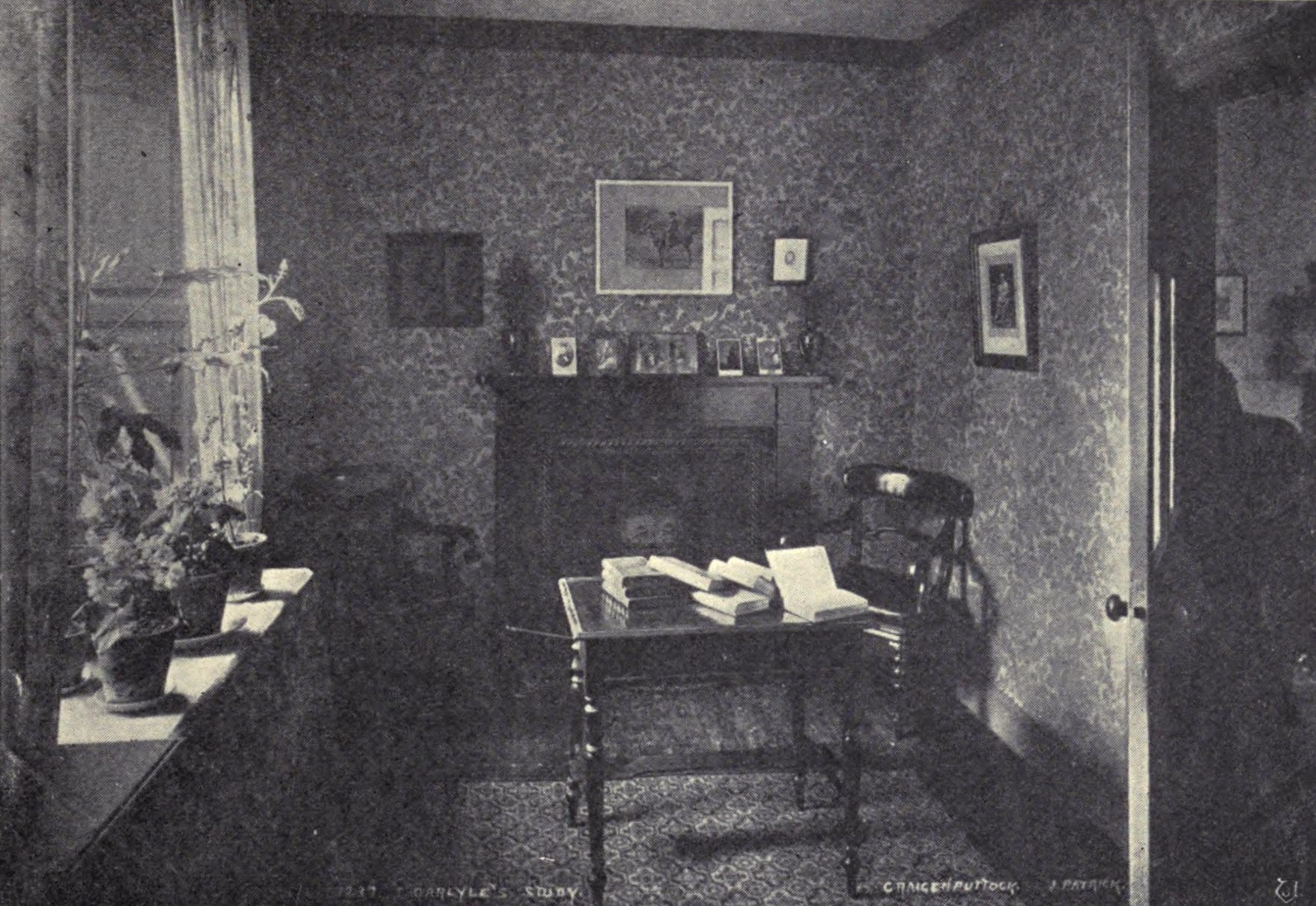
Room in which Sartor Resartus was written

At the writing of Book Two, the Editor has somewhat organised the fragments into a coherent narrative. As a boy, Teufelsdröckh was left in a basket on the doorstep of a childless couple in the German country town of Entepfuhl ("Duck-pond"); his father a retired sergeant of Frederick the Great and his mother a very pious woman, who, to Teufelsdröckh's gratitude, raises him in utmost spiritual discipline. In very flowery language, Teufelsdröckh recalls at length the values instilled in his idyllic childhood, the Editor noting how most of his descriptions originate in intense spiritual pride. Teufelsdröckh eventually is recognised as being clever, and sent to Hinterschlag ("Slap-behind") Gymnasium. While there, Teufelsdröckh is intellectually stimulated, and befriended by a few of his teachers, but frequently bullied by other students. His reflections on this time of his life are ambivalent: glad for his education, but critical of that education's disregard for actual human activity and character, as regarding both his own treatment and his education's application to politics. While at university, Teufelsdröckh encounters the same problems, but eventually gains a small teaching post and some favour and recognition from the German nobility. While interacting with these social circles, Teufelsdröckh meets a woman he calls Blumine ("Goddess of Flowers"; the Editor assumes this to be a pseudonym), and abandons his teaching post to pursue her. She spurns his advances for a British aristocrat named Towgood. Teufelsdröckh is thrust into a spiritual crisis, and leaves the city to wander the European countryside, but even there encounters Blumine and Towgood on their honeymoon. He sinks into a deep depression, culminating in the celebrated "Everlasting No", disdaining all human activity. Still trying to piece together the fragments, the Editor surmises that Teufelsdröckh either fights in a war during this period, or at least intensely uses its imagery, which leads him to a "Centre of Indifference", and on reflection of all the ancient villages and forces of history around him, ultimately comes upon the affirmation of all life in the "Everlasting Yea". The Editor, in relief, promises to return to Teufelsdröckh's book, hoping with the insights of his assembled biography to glean some new insight into the philosophy.

=== Characters ===
Herr Diogenes Teufelsdröckh: (Greek/German: "Zeus-Born Devil's Dung") The Professor of "Things in General" at Weissnichtwo University, and writer of a long book of German idealist philosophy called Clothes, Their Origin and Influence, the review of which forms the contents of the novel. Both professor and book are fictional.

The Editor: The narrator of the novel, who in reviewing Teufelsdröckh's book, reveals much about his own tastes, as well as deep sympathy towards Teufelsdröckh, and much worry as to social issues of his day. His tone varies between conversational, and condemning and even semi-Biblical prophecy. The Reviewer should not be confused with Carlyle himself, seeing as much of Teufelsdröckh's life implements Carlyle's own biography.

Hofrath: Hofrath Heuschrecke (i.e., State-Councillor Grasshopper) is a loose, zigzag figure, a blind admirer of Teufelsdröckh, an incarnation of distraction distracted, and the only one who advises the editor and encourages him in his work; a victim to timidity and preyed on by an uncomfortable sense of mere physical cold, such as the majority of the state-counsellors of the day were.

Blumine: A woman associated to the German nobility with whom Teufelsdröckh falls in love early in his career. Her spurning of him to marry Towgood leads Teufelsdröckh to the spiritual crisis that culminates in the Everlasting No. Their relationship is somewhat parodic of Werther's spurned love for Lotte in The Sorrows of Young Werther (including her name "Goddess of Flowers", which may simply be a pseudonym), though, as the Editor notes, Teufelsdröckh does not take as much incentive as does Werther. Critics have associated her with Kitty Kirkpatrick, with whom Carlyle himself fell in love before marrying Jane Carlyle.

Towgood: The English aristocrat who ultimately marries Blumine, throwing Teufelsdröckh into a spiritual crisis. If Blumine is indeed a fictionalisation of Kitty Kirkpatrick, Towgood would find his original in Captain James Winslowe Phillipps, who married Kirkpatrick in 1829.

=== Locales ===
Dumdrudge: Dumdrudge is an fictional village where the natives are over exploitated and they don't protest against it ,as villagers all over the world contentedly do.

"Weissnichtwo": In the book, Weissnichtwo (weiß-nicht-wo, German for "know-not-where") is an imaginary European city, viewed as the focus, and as exhibiting the operation, of all the influences for good and evil of the time, described in terms which characterised city life in the first quarter of the 19th century; so universal appeared the spiritual forces at work in society at that time that it was impossible to say where they were and where they were not, and hence the name of the city, "Know-not-where" (cf. Sir Walter Scott's Kennaquhair).

== Themes ==
Sartor Resartus was intended to be a new kind of book: simultaneously factual and fictional, serious and satirical, speculative and historical. It ironically commented on its own formal structure, while forcing the reader to confront the problem of where "truth" is to be found. In this respect it develops techniques used much earlier in Tristram Shandy, to which it refers. The imaginary "Philosophy of Clothes" holds that meaning is to be derived from phenomena, continually shifting over time, as cultures reconstruct themselves in changing fashions, power-structures, and faith-systems. The book contains a very Fichtean conception of religious conversion: based not on the acceptance of God but on the absolute freedom of the will to reject evil, and to construct meaning. This has led some writers to see Sartor Resartus as an early existentialist text.

One of the recurring jokes is Carlyle giving humorously appropriate German names to places and people in the novel, such as Teufelsdröckh's publisher being named Stillschweigen and Co. (meaning Silence and Company) and lodgings being in Weissnichtwo (meaning Know-not-where). Teufelsdröckh's father is introduced as an earnest believer in Walter Shandy's doctrine that "there is much, nay almost all in Names".

== Reception and legacy ==
James Fraser complained to Carlyle that its initial serial publication had been received negatively in many quarters. The most substantive early treatment came in the form of an 1835 letter to Carlyle from his friend the author John Sterling. Sterling compared it to François Rabelais, Michel de Montaigne, Laurence Sterne and Jonathan Swift, while taking issue with Carlyle's style and what he perceived as Teufelsdröckh's pantheism.

Sartor Resartus was best received in America, where Carlyle became a dominant cultural influence and a perceived leader of the Transcendental Movement. In 1834 the writer Harriet Martineau, visiting from England, observed its effect: "The book is acting upon them with wonderful force. It has regenerated the preaching of more than one of the clergy; and, I have reason to believe, the minds and lives of several of the laity." After its 1836 arrival in Boston as a book, Nathaniel Langdon Frothingham accurately predicted that reaction would be divided between those that found it vapid and convoluted and those that found it insightful and philosophically fruitful. James Russell Lowell regarded the book as "the signal for a sudden mental and moral mutiny".

=== Influence ===
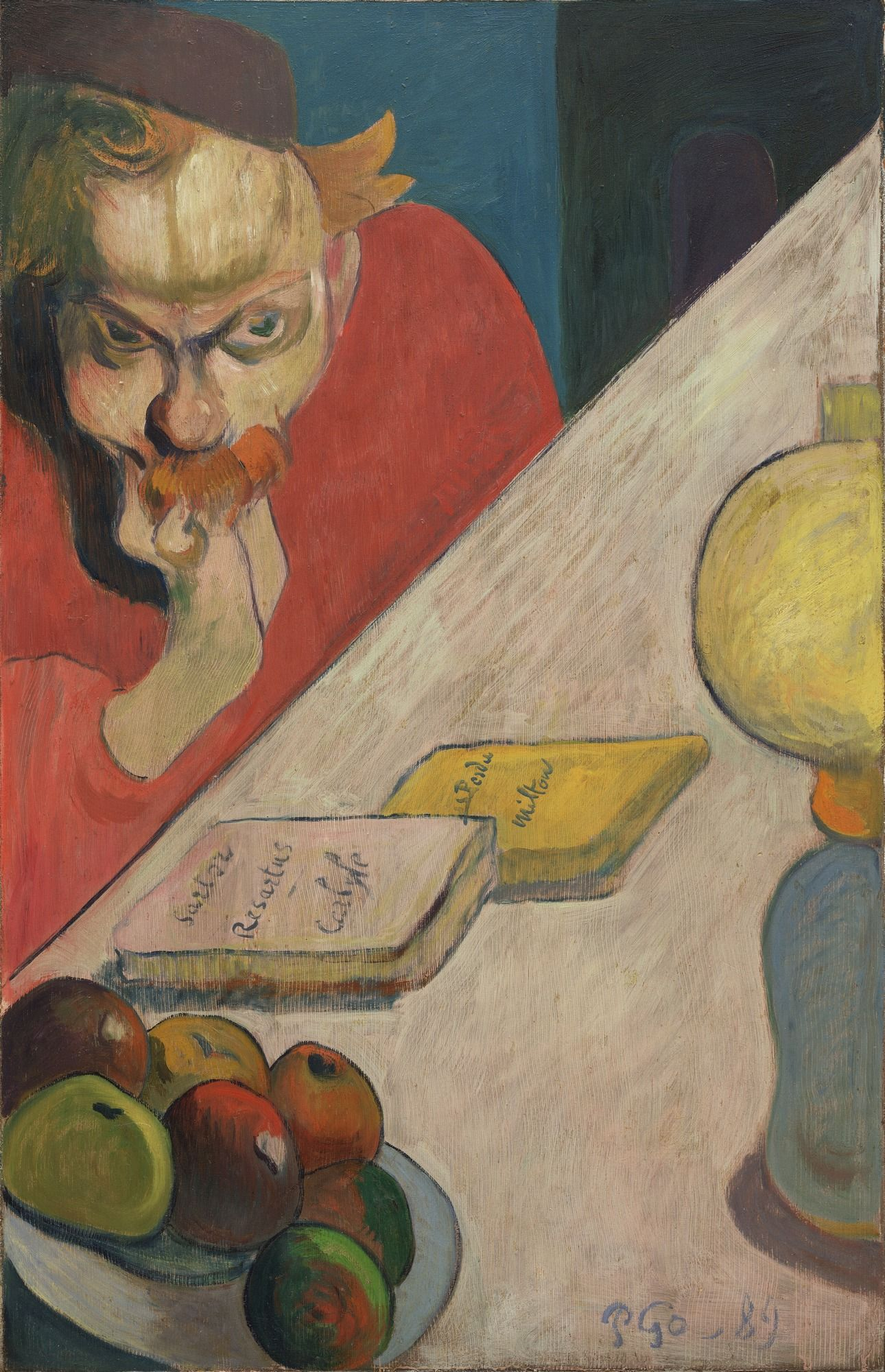
Portrait of Meijer de Haan by Paul Gauguin, 1889, with Haan's copy of Sartor Resartus in the foreground

In 1855 George Eliot wrote of Carlyle:

The character of his influence is best seen in the fact that many of the men who have the least agreement with his opinions are those to whom the reading of Sartor Resartus was an epoch in the history of their minds.

According to Rodger L. Tarr, "The influence of Sartor Resartus upon American Literature is so vast, so pervasive, that it is difficult to overstate." Tarr notes its influence on such leading American writers as Emerson, Emily Dickinson, Henry David Thoreau, Herman Melville, Margaret Fuller, Louisa May Alcott and Mark Twain (Nathaniel Hawthorne and Edgar Allan Poe were among those that read and objected to the book). Andrew Preston Peabody wrote in 1860 that "Carlyle first took a strong hold on the cultivated mind of America by his 'Sartor Resartus,'—a work more full of seed-thoughts than any single volume of the present century," adding that the following publication of the Critical and Miscellaneous Essays "was in almost every one's hands." Charles Godfrey Leland wrote that he "read it through forty times ere I left college, of which I 'kept count.'" William Henry Milburn wrote that he "was as familiar with the everlasting Nay, the Centre of Indifference, and the everlasting Yea, as with the side walk in front of my house."

Keir Hardie, the founder of the Labour Party, recalled reading the book as a teenager until "the spirit of it somewhat entered into me". His encounter with Carlyle became one of the most enduring influences of his life, shaping his radicalism and pacifism.

Jorge Luis Borges greatly admired the book, recounting that in 1916 at age 17 "[I] discovered, and was overwhelmed by, Thomas Carlyle. I read Sartor Resartus, and I can recall many of its pages; I know them by heart." Many of Borges's first characteristic and most admired works employ the same technique of intentional pseudepigraphy as Carlyle, such as "The Garden of Forking Paths" and "Tlön, Uqbar, Orbis Tertius".

Paul Gauguin painted the book in his portrait of Meyer de Haan, who had imported the book into Pont-Aven. Maurice Maeterlinck valued Carlyle's ideas on silence. Claude Debussy called the book "that cruel breviary of humor" and imagined a missing chapter, "The Relationship of the Hat to Music." T. J. Cobden-Sanderson chose the book as a piece of "eternal literature" for his Doves Press.

Martin Luther King Jr. paraphrased a line from book 2, chapter 7, paragraph 4 of Sartor Resartus in a sermon delivered in 1957: "In our moments of despair, some of us find ourselves crying out with the earnest belief of Carlyle, 'It seems that God sits in His heaven and does nothing.'"

The novel has been identified as containing the first appearance in English of the proverb "Speech is silver, silence is golden", as well as the first English use of the expression "meaning of life."

The literary critic Alastair Fowler used the book as an example of his term "poioumenon", a work that addresses the process of its own creation.

The book is increasingly recognised as "the founding text for the emergence of the serious and organized study of clothing", otherwise termed "dress studies" or "fashion theory".
