= Silence Is Golden =

Speech is silver, silence is golden is a proverb.

Silence Is Golden may also refer to:

- "Silence Is Golden" (song), a song recorded by The Four Seasons and The Tremeloes
- Silence Is Golden (film), a 2006 short film by Chris Shepherd
- Man About Town (1947 film), originally Le Silence est d'or (Silence is golden), a 1947 film by René Clair and Robert Pirosh
- Silence Is Golden (EP), an EP by A Thorn For Every Heart
- "Silence Is Golden", a song by Garbage from the album Beautiful Garbage
- "Silence Is Golden", a song by The Beths from the album Expert in a Dying Field
