= Reminiscences (Carlyle) =

1881 book by Thomas Carlyle

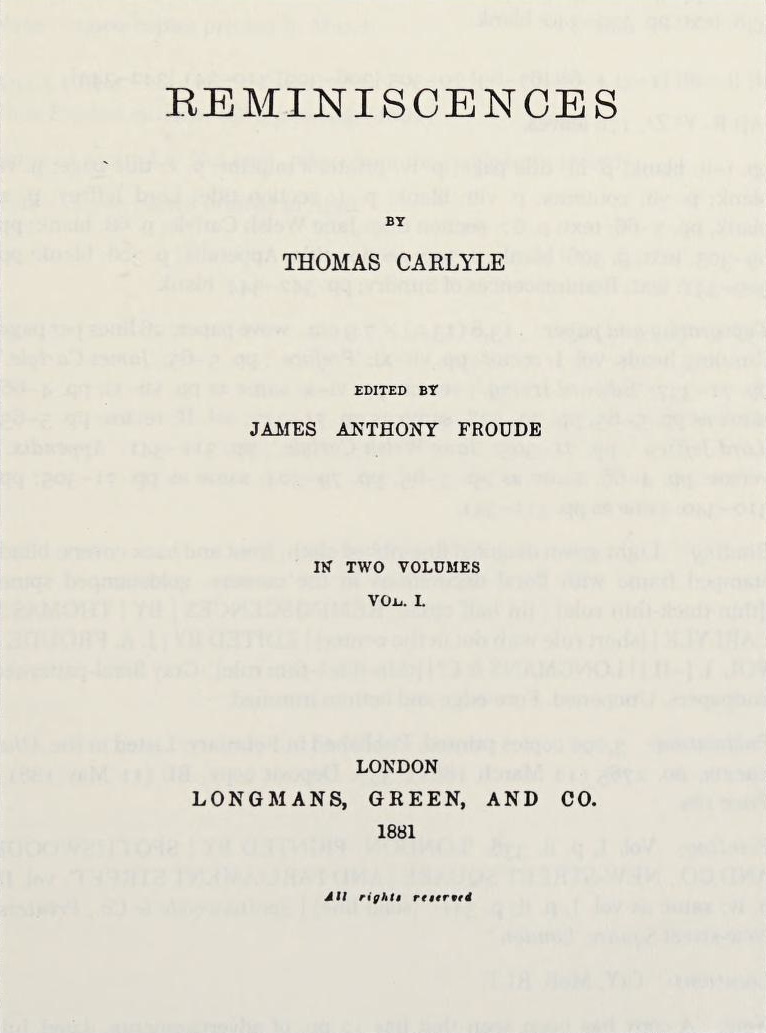
- Title page of the first English edition
- Author: Thomas Carlyle
- Language: English
- Genre: Autobiography
- Published: 1881
- Publisher: Longmans, Green, and Co.
- Publication place: England

Reminiscences is a book by historian and social critic Thomas Carlyle, posthumously published in 1881, which contains two lengthy memoirs of the author's wife, Jane Welsh Carlyle, and friend Edward Irving, together with shorter essays on his father and some of the literary friends of his youth. The book's emphasis primarily rests on Carlyle's relationship with the subjects. The book was begun in 1832 but mainly written in the year following Jane Carlyle's death, in April 1866. Many of its first readers were shocked by the impression it gave of a harsh, gloomy, censorious personality and of a man racked by remorse over his failings as a husband; it did Carlyle's reputation as the sage and prophet of the Victorian era lasting harm. Nevertheless, it is characterized by great vividness and accuracy of detail, and by a comparatively direct, conversational style, and has been called an autobiographical masterpiece.

== Contents ==
The order of contents here is that of the 1997 edition.

- James Carlyle
- Jane Welsh Carlyle
- Edward Irving
- Francis Jeffrey
- Reminiscences of Sundry: Southey and Wordsworth
- Christopher North (included in the 1932 and later editions)
- Sir William Hamilton (included in the 1972 and later editions)

== Description ==
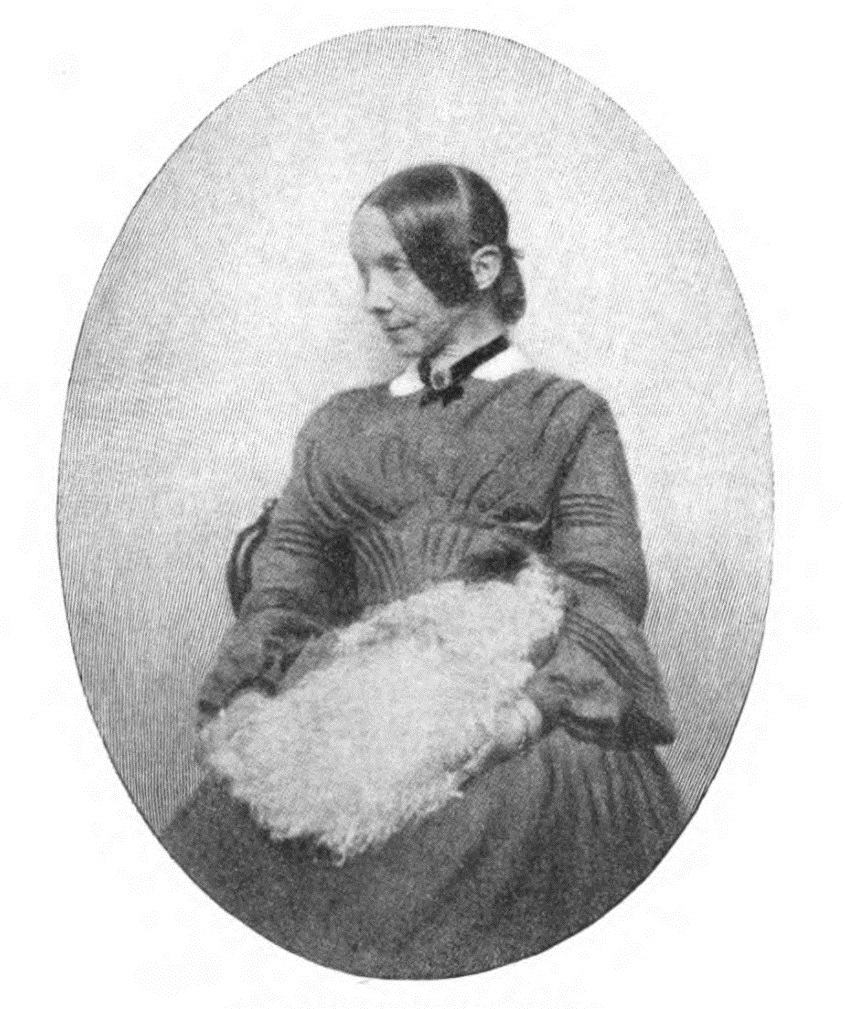
Jane Welsh Carlyle, who was commemorated in her husband's Reminiscences, wrote her own memoirs but burned the manuscript before her death.

Carlyle was famous for the brilliance of his conversation, which often turned on his memories of his past life in Scotland, and the Reminiscences have been called "a crystallization of many such nights' talk", presented in a more personal, unliterary style than he usually adopted. One reviewer felt himself to be overhearing a soliloquy. The essays bearing the names of Jane Carlyle, Irving and Jeffrey concentrate not so much on the title-figures themselves as on Carlyle's relationship with them, and to that extent are exercises in autobiography such as Emerson had proposed he write (see below), whereas the later ones are more strictly biographical. All are remarkable for the detail and immediacy with which they present events that had happened up to 50 years previously. They demonstrate Carlyle's extraordinary powers of memory, the accuracy of which is borne out by the evidence of his and his wife's contemporaneous letters. The Reminiscences have in recent years been called "an autobiographical masterpiece equal to any writing of its kind in the century".

== Composition ==
On 23 January 1832, while Carlyle was in London, he learned that his father James Carlyle had died at the family home in Dumfriesshire two days previously. Stunned by this news, and unable to attend the funeral, his mind was forcibly turned to his earliest memories, inducing him to write a reminiscence of his father and of his own childhood. Separating himself from everyone except his wife Jane to concentrate on this task, he completed it on 29 January.

More than 30 years later, in April 1866, Jane herself died. Carlyle's friend Ralph Waldo Emerson suggested that this would be a good time for Carlyle to write an autobiography, but this idea repelled him. Carlyle went through his wife's letters, admiring their literary excellence and wit, and shocked and guilt-stricken at the depth of sadness, partly caused by his own insensitivity and neglect of her, they revealed. On receiving a notebook from Geraldine Jewsbury containing biographical anecdotes of her friend Jane, Thomas sent her a letter criticising the notebook's factual inaccuracy. He began correcting the errors, and this work was the beginning of the Reminiscence of Jane Welsh Carlyle, a work in which he expressed his overwhelming grief and remorse, and presented an idealized picture of his wife as a saint who had sacrificed her own happiness for the sake of his literary career. This work occupied him through the summer of 1866.

He began a reminiscence of the clergyman Edward Irving in autumn 1866, then another of the lawyer and editor Francis Jeffrey, both of them close friends of himself and of Jane. They were completed in January 1867, by which time he was staying in Menton on the French Riviera. On 28 January 1867 he began another chapter which he called "Reminiscences of Sundry", but despite the title he only dealt with two of his old literary acquaintances, Robert Southey and William Wordsworth, before, on 8 March 1867, still at Menton, laying down his pen with the words "Why should I continue these melancholy jottings in which I have no interest; in which the one Figure that could interest me is almost wanting! I will cease." Finally, two more short pieces, on the lawyer and critic "Christopher North" (pseudonym of John Wilson) and the philosopher Sir William Hamilton, were completed on 26 March 1868 and 19 February 1868 respectively.

== Publication ==
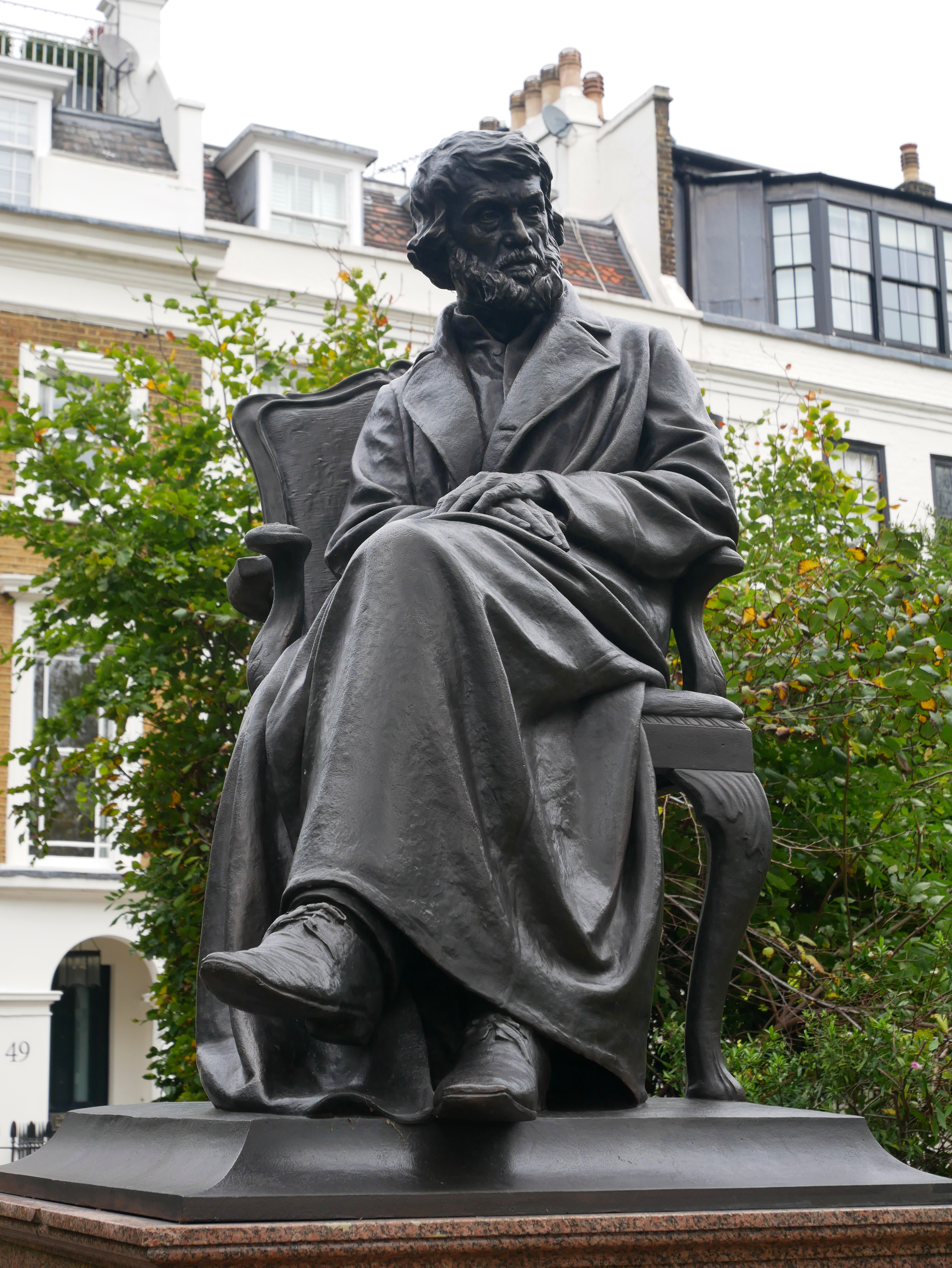
The statue of Carlyle on Chelsea Embankment, sculpted by Joseph Edgar Boehm The shadow cast on Carlyle's reputation by the publication of the Reminiscences almost stalled the campaign to raise this monument.

Carlyle explicitly directed that the Reminiscences were never to be published "without fit editing", but he reportedly later revoked this prohibition and gave his friend James Anthony Froude, the historian, permission to publish them should he see fit. As Carlyle's death approached Froude had the work set up in type and wrote an introduction for it; in February 1881, three weeks after Carlyle's funeral, it was published by Longman. Froude's edition was remarkably inaccurate, misreading, altering or re-arranging words, phrases, and even whole sentences. Over 17,000 errors have been detected, albeit mostly minor ones. In the United States Froude's edition was published by both Scribner and Harper, the two publishing houses being in dispute over which owned the US rights. In 1887 the Reminiscences were edited anew by Charles Eliot Norton and published by Macmillan. This edition was greatly superior to Froude's, though still inaccurate by modern standards. Norton's edition was reprinted as part of Everyman's Library in 1932 with the addition, for the first time, of the reminiscence of Christopher North; and again in 1972 by Everyman University Library, with both "Christopher North" and "Sir William Hamilton" being included. Kenneth J Fielding and Ian Campbell's edition, published in 1997 by Oxford University Press in their Oxford World's Classics series, is described as "the most complete and authoritative to date".

== The Froude-Carlyle controversy ==
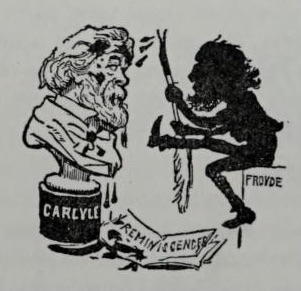
"Froude besmirching Carlyle", illustration from Punch's Almanac, 31 December 1881

The publication shortly after Carlyle's death of Froude's edition of the Reminiscences, and also of the first volumes of his biography of Carlyle and his edition of Jane Carlyle's letters, provoked a hostile and lasting critical reaction which became known as the Froude-Carlyle controversy. The "hail-storm of criticism", as Froude described it, was in part directed at himself for his failure to excise passages that might harm Carlyle's reputation, with one letter to The Times comparing his editorial technique to that of a carter dumping a load of bricks. And Carlyle's reputation did indeed suffer considerably. Exception was taken to various contemptuous references to past acquaintances, especially Charles Lamb and Basil Montagu, to the overly laudatory portrait of Carlyle's father, and to the overly critical one of Jeffrey. Most damagingly, readers found in the Reminiscences an unfamiliar Carlyle, morose, harsh, self-pitying and self-indulgent. The book presented, according to the reviewer in The Spectator, "a picture with almost a permanent scowl on it". J. C. Morison, a former disciple of Carlyle, complained in The Fortnightly Review that the Reminiscences showed him "inwardly bankrupt of faith, hope and charity, looking on the world with moody anger and querulous unsatisfied egotism". George Bentley, in Temple Bar, wrote that "probably in English literature there is nowhere to be found written by a man so eminent and so religiously minded, a more unkind, splenetic and scornful book". Several years later The Bookseller characterized the publication of Carlyle's Reminiscences as "the shattering of the idol".
