= Geraldine Jewsbury =

English novelist and book reviewer (1812–1880)

Geraldine Endsor Jewsbury
- Jewsbury in 1880
- Born: 12 August 1812; Measham, Derbyshire
- Died: 23 September 1880 (aged 68); London
- Resting place: Brompton Cemetery
- Occupations: Writer, book reviewer
- Relatives: Maria Jane (sister)

Geraldine Endsor Jewsbury (22 August 1812 – 23 September 1880) was an English novelist, book reviewer and literary figure in London, best known for popular novels such as Zoe: the History of Two Lives and reviews for the literary periodical the Athenaeum. Jewsbury never married, but enjoyed intimate friendships, notably with Jane Carlyle, wife of the essayist Thomas Carlyle. Jewsbury's romantic feelings for her and the complexity of their relations appear in Jewsbury's writings. She tried unsuccessfully to encourage her close friend Walter Mantell to start a new life as an author after his disagreement with the New Zealand government over Maori land rights.

== Family and education ==
Jewsbury was born at Measham, Derbyshire (since 1897 Leicestershire), the daughter of Thomas Jewsbury (died 1840), a cotton manufacturer and merchant, and his wife Maria, née Smith, (died 1819). Her paternal grandfather, Thomas Jewsbury Sr (died 1799), had been a surveyor of roads, an engineer of canals and a philosophy student. In his will, he left the family four cottages, a warehouse, some land in Measham, and a large cash bequest.

Thomas Jr and Maria had six children: Maria Jane (1800), Thomas (1802), Henry (1803), Geraldine (1812), Arthur (1815) and Frank (1819). Maria Jane had literary interests and wrote for the Manchester Gazette. After their mother's early death, she helped to bring up the family until she married, but she herself died young of cholera. Geraldine then took care of her father until he died, and also of Frank until he married.

Her father's cotton business suffered from the War of 1812, and he became an insurance agent based in Manchester. Geraldine was educated at a boarding school kept by the Misses Darbys at Alder Mills near Tamworth, Staffordshire, and continued her studies in French, Italian and drawing in London in 1830–1831. Soon after returning to her family home, she began to suffer from depression, question her fate and express religious doubts. This change was reflected in her first novel, Zoe: the History of Two Lives.

== Relationship with Jane Carlyle ==
About 1840, Jewsbury wrote to the eminent Scottish author Thomas Carlyle for advice about a literary career. Invited to his home in Chelsea, London, she immediately began a warm friendship and correspondence with his wife Jane that would become the deepest relationship of her life.

Jewsbury destroyed the letters she received from Jane, as Jane had agreed to destroy Jewsbury's, which her sudden death prevented her from doing. Early on, Jewsbury developed passionate feelings for Jane, as surviving letters reveal. On the other hand, early accounts of Jane reveal ambivalence towards Jewsbury. When Carlyle proposed that Jewsbury visit them at 5 Cheyne Row in 1843, Jane hesitated, finally admitting to Carlyle: "'Why I am afraid that having her beside me from morning till night would be dreadfully wearing'!" She complained of how Jewsbury was "always in a state of emotion! dropping hot tears on my hands, and watching me and fussing me".

Jane and Jewsbury weathered many disagreements, especially over the role of women, as Jane was a famously dutiful wife, who never considered a career of her own. However, the friendship lasted over 25 years; Jane attempted (unsuccessfully) to find suitors for Jewsbury, and Jewsbury nursed Jane through periods of illness.

Their relationship was studied by literary scholars, including Virginia Woolf in her article on Jewsbury’s letters to Jane. It also contributed to Jewsbury's appearance in print that Jane helped to edit her first two books.

== Novels ==
Jewsbury was primarily a novelist of ideas and moral dilemmas, who sharply questioned the standard, idealised roles of wife and mother and promoted the spiritual value of work in a woman's life. She often made her female characters wiser and more capable than the male ones.

Her first novel, Zoe: the History of Two Lives (1845), tells of a girl who falls in love with a Catholic priest, causing him to lapse from his faith. The story carries a strong theme of doubt, not only about religious belief, but about marriage as a woman's prime destiny. It was initially rejected by the publisher, but later accepted after an intervention by Thomas Carlyle. It was an immediate success, and praised by the Manchester Examiner as "striking" and "clever", although other reviews were mixed. As a novel of scepticism, it can be classed with the work of Charlotte Mary Yonge and Mrs Humphry Ward, while the linking of sexual feelings with spiritual anguish brought comparisons with George Sand.

Jewsbury's next novel, The Half Sisters (1848), also questions the role of wife and mother, which are seen as unsatisfying and limiting. The life of the conventional woman, Alice, compares unfavourably with that of her half-sister Bianca, who works as an actress to support an insane mother. The character of Alice carries touches of Jane Carlyle, while Bianca is based clearly on another of Jewsbury's close friends, Charlotte Cushman. This was the author's own favourite among her novels.

Her third novel, Marian Withers (1851), explores the same theme of women's fulfilment, this time in an industrial setting, drawing on first-hand experience of the Manchester business world. It introduced the themes of education, creative invention, status in the workplace, and public philanthropy. The novel tells a number of different stories, connected by analogy, and some critics disliked such a fragmentary structure.

Three further novels (Constance Herbert, 1855; The Sorrows of Gentility, 1856; and Right or Wrong, 1859) attracted less interest. Jewsbury also wrote two novels for children: The History of an Adopted Child (1852) and Angelo, or, The Pine Forest in the Alps (1855).

== Short stories ==
Dickens commissioned 17 stories from Jewsbury between 1850 and 1859, for his periodical Household Words. He once wrote to her, "Dear Miss Jewsbury, – I make no apology for addressing you thus, for I am a reader of yours, and I hope that I have that knowledge of you which may justify a frank approach.... If I could induce you to write any papers or short stories for [Household Words] I should, I sincerely assure you, set great store by your help, and be much gratified in having it."

== Reviewing ==
Jewsbury is believed to have reviewed over 2000 books between 1846 and 1880, including novels, children's books, memoirs, biographies, histories, cookbooks and household management books, mainly for the weekly Athenaeum. As most reviews were anonymous at that time, the exact total is unknown. Anonymity also set up an atmosphere of suspicion between authors and critics. Many of Jewsbury’s reviews were wrongly attributed to the novelist and non-fiction writer John Cordy Jeaffreson. When Rhoda Broughton discovered that an unfavourable review of her novel had been written by Jewsbury, she included an unflattering caricature of her in one of her later books, The Beginner, although this appeared after Jewsbury's death.

Jewsbury was very much a moral critic. Her chief criterion was the ability of the characters to distinguish right from wrong, and this weighed with her more than the plot. For example, she disapproved of stories about an older man pining for a younger woman. She also disliked love scenes and domestic novels in general. Popular authors she reviewed included Anthony Trollope, George Eliot, George Meredith and Wilkie Collins.

Jewsbury also worked as a publisher's reader for Hurst and Blackett and for Bentley, recommending, for example, that the latter publish Ellen Wood's best-selling East Lynne (1861), although turning down such later successful authors as M. E. Braddon and Ouida. She often used her place with Bentley to boost the careers of other female writers, including friends like Margaret Oliphant and Frances Power Cobbe.

== Friends and romances ==
Jewsbury was highly sociable, with many friends and literary partnerships, and able to find common ground with people of any class. Her growing prominence and unconventional personality, smoking and wearing men's clothes like George Sand, soon brought her a high profile in literary society. Her friends included the Huxley, Kingsley, Rossetti, and Browning families, W. E. Forster (with whom she visited revolutionary Paris in 1848), John Bright, John Ruskin and G. H. Lewes.

She never married, but had close personal relationships with men and women, some carnal, some platonic, the most significant being with Jane Carlyle. Another was with the actress Charlotte Cushman, a powerful, notably mannish figure, whom she admired for her wide experience of life, which contrasted with Jane's dutiful domesticity. (Jane Carlyle became jealous and upset about the relationship.) Cushman was the model for Bianca in The Half Sisters.

Sydney Owenson, also known as Lady Morgan, had helped Jewsbury when she first arrived in London, and Jewsbury provided much unconditional friendship, eventually helping her to write her memoirs in old age.

Of her male companions, the most significant was a government official in New Zealand, Walter Mantell, eight years her junior, who felt uneasy about his task of pressuring the Maoris to sell their land cheaply to the British, and returned to live in England. She made great efforts to promote him in the literary world, and even proposed marriage, but it seems that he began to sicken of her attentions and they drifted apart.

== Death ==
Jewsbury moved to Sevenoaks, Kent, after the death of Jane Carlyle in 1866. She herself contracted cancer in 1879, died in a private London hospital in 1880, and was buried in Brompton Cemetery. She was writing until the end of her life, her last report for Bentley being dated 9 September 1880. She left all her papers to the businessman and feminist John Stores Smith, with whom she had had a strong relationship.
