= Jenny Kiss'd Me =

Poem written by Leigh Hunt

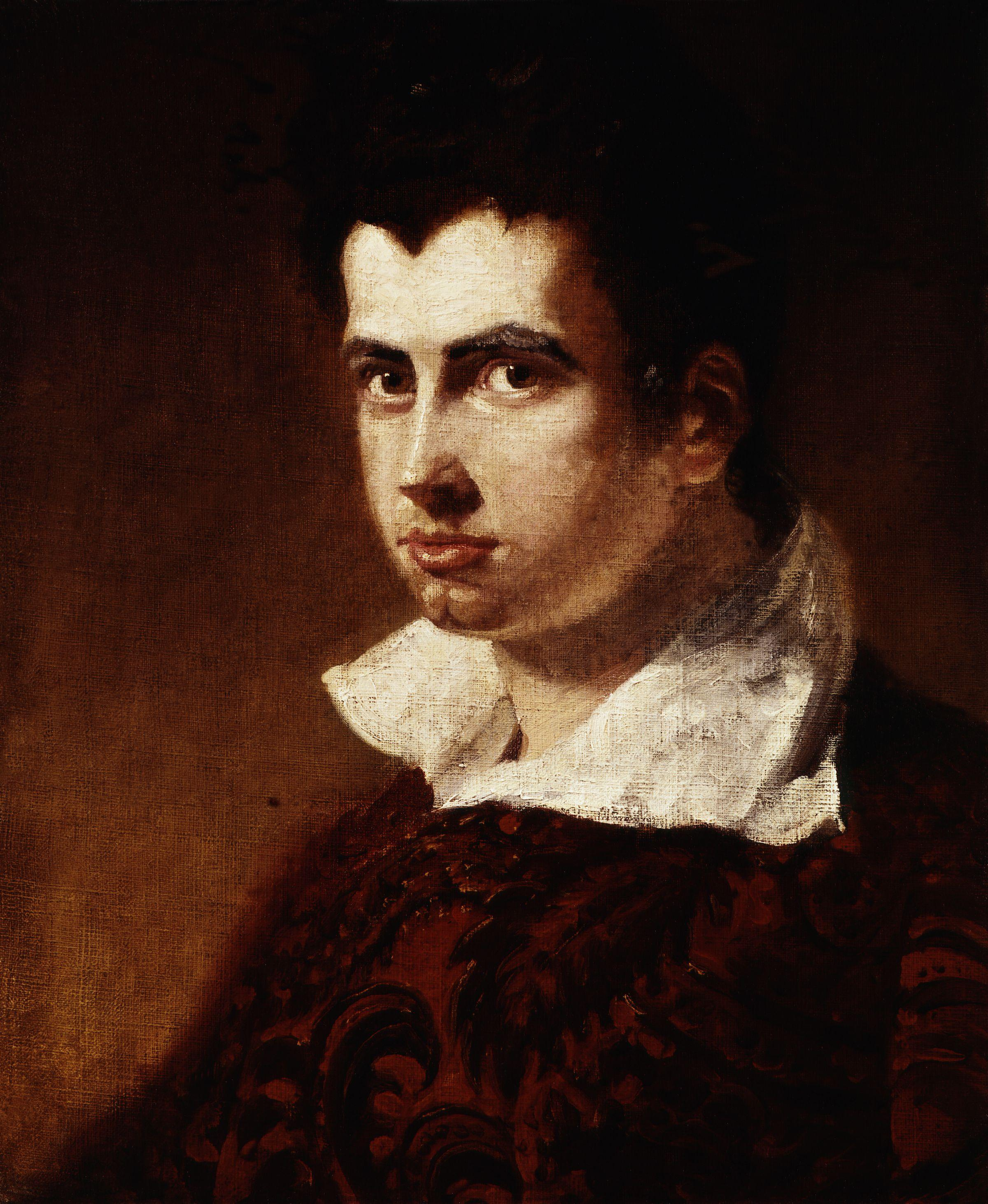
Leigh Hunt in a portrait by Benjamin Robert Haydon

"Jenny Kiss'd Me" (original title: Rondeau) is a poem by the English essayist Leigh Hunt. It was first published in November 1838 by the Monthly Chronicle.

The poem — per its original title, a rondeau — was inspired by Jane Welsh, the wife of Thomas Carlyle. According to anthologist Martin Gardner, "Jenny kiss'd Me" was written during a flu epidemic, and refers to an unexpected visit by the recovered Hunt to the Carlyle household and being greeted by Jenny.

== Poem ==
Jenny Kissed Me

The complete poem is:

Jenny kiss'd me when we met,
Jumping from the chair she sat in;
Time, you thief, who love to get
Sweets into your list, put that in!
Say I'm weary, say I'm sad,
Say that health and wealth have miss'd me,
Say I'm growing old, but add
Jenny kiss'd me.

The poem was deemed worthy of inclusion in The Oxford Book of English Verse, Hazel Felleman's Best-Loved Poems of the American People, and Martin Gardner's Best Remembered Poems.

Jeppe Aakjær translated the poem to the Danish dialect Jutlandic on 19 December 1926.
