= Cheyne Row =

Street in Chelsea, London, England

Coordinates: 51°29′1.38″N 0°10′10.57″W

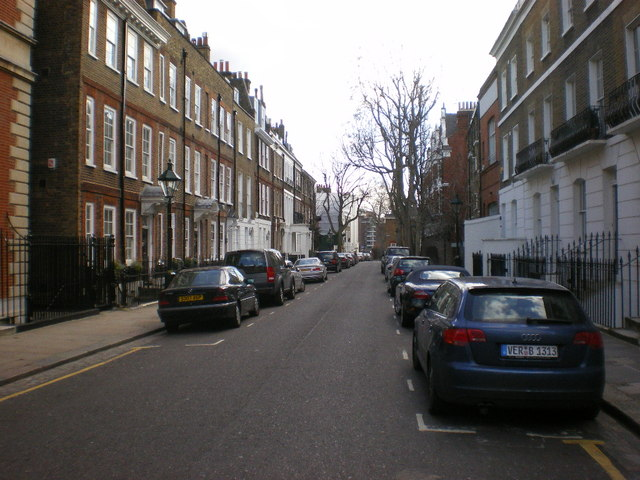
Cheyne Row

Cheyne Row is a residential street in Chelsea, London.

It runs roughly north to south from the crossroads with Upper Cheyne Row, where it becomes Glebe Place, leading down to a t-junction with Cheyne Walk which forms an embankment of the River Thames. It was named after Charles Cheyne, 1st Viscount Newhaven (c. 1624–1698) who purchased the manor of Chelsea in Middlesex, then a rural village. The original Cheyne House was built at 2 Upper Cheyne Row in c1715 for Elizabeth Gerard, the dowager Duchess of Hamilton.

== Notable buildings ==
16–34, including Carlyle's House at No 24, are grade II* listed, and built in 1708. 22-33 are grade II listed.

The grade II listed Roman Catholic parish church, Church of Our Most Holy Redeemer and St Thomas More, Chelsea is on the corner of Cheyne Row and Upper Cheyne Row.

== Notable residents ==
No 24 was home to the historian Thomas Carlyle and is now known as Carlyle's House and is a National Trust property open to the public. It was later home to the actor and writer Thea Holme (1904–1980), who moved there when her husband became the house's curator.

In 1833, Leigh Hunt, a friend of Carlyle, moved next door.

In 1780, the artist John Collett died at his home there.

By 1921, the American historian Hope Emily Allen was living at 116 Cheyne Row with her friend, the scientist-artist Marietta Pallis.
