= Speech is silver, silence is golden =

Proverb extolling the value of silence over speech

Page from the 1901 edition of Thomas Carlyle's Sartor Resartus (1833–34) on which the proverb appears, marking its earliest usage in English.

"Speech is silver, silence is golden" is a proverb praising the value of silence over speech. Its modern form most likely originated in Arabic culture, where it was used as early as the 9th century.

== Meaning ==
"Speech is silver, silence is golden" has been described as "perhaps the best known of the proverbs concerned with silence". Similar proverbs in English include "Still waters run deep" and "Empty vessels make the most sound."

There are similar proverbs in other languages, for example, the Talmudic proverb in the Aramaic language, "if a word be worth one shekel, silence is worth two", which was translated into English in the 17th century. Praise of silence can also be found in much older works, including the Bible, for example, "In the multitude of words there wanteth not sin, but he that refraineth his lips is wise." (Proverbs, 10:19).

== Origins and spread ==
In 1932, Richard Jente described the "silver" and "gold" proverb as being "of Eastern origin". In 1999, David J. Wasserstein remarked that the "Eastern origin" mentioned by a number of earlier writers was most likely the Aramaic "shekels" proverb, as it connects speech, silence, and monetary value. Wasserstein argued, however, that the Aramaic "shekels" proverb – which had already been published in English by John Ray in a 1678 Collection of English Proverbs – was related, perhaps sharing the same ancient origin, but differed from the version in European culture that uses the terms "silver" and "gold". Wasserstein traced the latter version to Arabic culture, observing that it had been widely used in Arabic for centuries, having been recorded in the writings of the 11th-century Muslim scholar Al-Raghib al-Isfahani and the 9th-century writer Al-Jahiz (the latter wrote that, "if speech were of silver, then silence would be of gold"). The "silver"–and "gold" proverb was also known in Islamic Spain, where it was recorded in the 11th century by Ibn Hayyan of Cordoba.

In some Arabic works, the proverb has been attributed to King Solomon. 10th-century Georgian author Giorgi Merchule, in his "The Vita of Gregory of Khandzta", attributes this proverb to King Solomon. Wasserstein writes that there is no verifiable evidence for such an origin, as no ancient Jewish version of the proverb using the terms "silver" and "gold" has been found. He also notes that some other Arabic works, again with no verifiable evidence, have attributed the "silver" and–"gold" proverb to Luqman the Wise, and Wasserstein concludes that the real origin is likely lost to history, while the oldest surviving sources have simply attributed the proverb to "wise men of old".

According to Wasserstein, the proverb, in its "silver"–and–"gold" version, most likely entered Western culture through the work of a 14th-century Spanish Jew, Santob de Carrion, also known as Shem Tob ben Isaac Ardutiel, a Hebrew writer and translator of Arabic texts; and over the next centuries came to be used in Spanish and eventually also in other European languages.

According to Jente, the proverb became popular in Germany in the early 19th century, then spread to the English language, possibly through German immigrants in the United States. Wasserstein writes that its first recorded use in English was the novel Sartor Resartus (1833–34) by Thomas Carlyle, who, for reasons unknown, attributed it to a "Swiss inscription". A similar saying, however, "discourse is silver, silence is gold", and attributed as a "Greek proverb", was printed in English as early as 1818 in a collection that reprinted material from the Researches in Greece (1814) of William Martin Leake.

The proverb's origins and history of its earliest English-language appearances were already of interest to the English public by the second half of the 19th century, when the matter was discussed in a series of exchanges in the literary journal, Notes and Queries, in which several contributors commented on the question in the context of Carlyle's book.
