= Jane Welsh Carlyle =

Scottish writer (1801-1866)

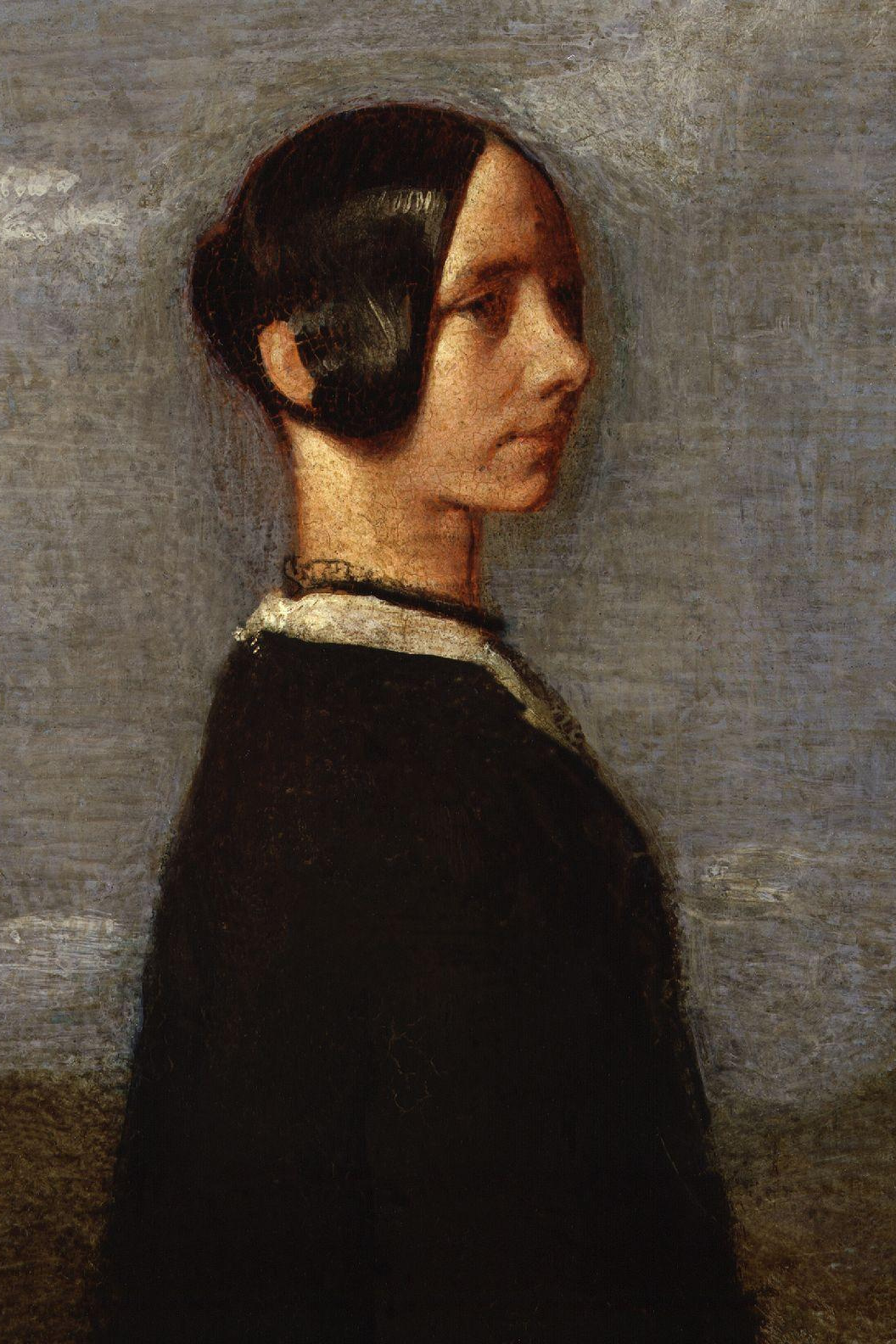
- Born: Jane Baillie Welsh; 14 July 1801; Haddington, Haddingtonshire, Scotland
- Died: 21 April 1866 (aged 64); London, England
- Resting place: St Mary's Collegiate Church, Haddington, Scotland
- Occupation: Writer
- Spouse: Thomas Carlyle (m. 1826–1866)
- Parents: John Welsh (father); Grace Caplegill (mother)

Signature
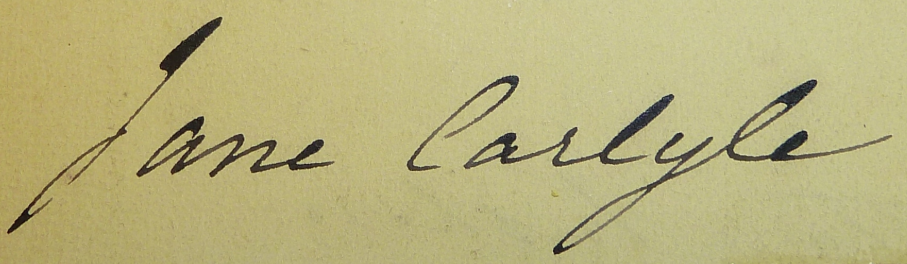

Jane Baillie Carlyle (née Welsh; 14 July 1801 – 21 April 1866) was a Scottish writer and the wife of Thomas Carlyle.

Although she did not publish any novels in her lifetime, she was widely known as an extraordinary letter writer. Virginia Woolf called her one of the "great letter writers", and Elizabeth Hardwick described her work as a "private writing career".

== Life ==
Jane Baillie Welsh was born in Haddington, East Lothian (then Haddingtonshire), 14 July 1801, to Grace Caplegill and John Welsh (1770–1819).

=== Marriage to Thomas Carlyle ===
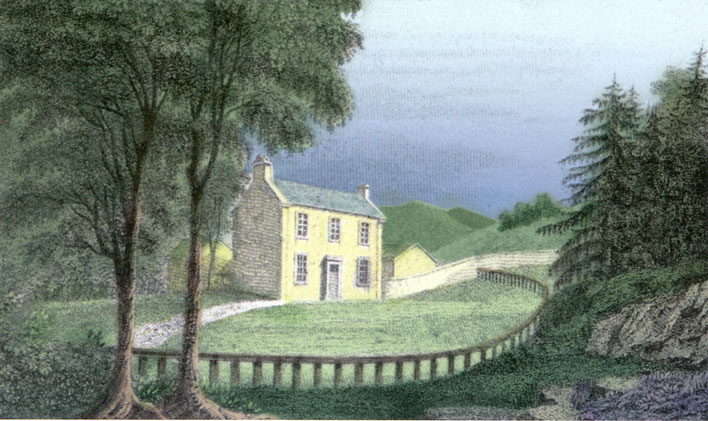
Craigenputtock House 1829

Jane's tutor Edward Irving had introduced her to Carlyle in 1821, with whom she came to have a mutual romantic attraction. The couple married in 1826 and moved to 21 Comely Bank, Edinburgh. In 1828, they moved to Craigenputtock. Thomas was often busy writing, while Jane remained dutiful in doing the housework. In 1834, the Carlyles moved to 5 Cheyne Row, Chelsea, London. Jane took on the added job of keeping the neighbourhood quiet so that her husband could write undisturbed. Phyllis Rose wrote "the quintessential expression of Jane's role within the marriage was her continuing battle to protect her husband from the crowing of cocks."

In a letter to her husband written in 1844, Jane wrote about this arrangement. "I slept much better last night—in spite of cocks of every variety of power, a dog, and a considerable rumblement of carts! but the evil of these things was not doubled and tripled for me by the reflection that you were being kept awake by them". Despite such remarks, the marriage was ultimately loving, as another letter from a week later shows: "I am always wondering since I came here how I can ever in my angriest moods talk about leaving you for good and all—for to be sure if I were to leave you today on that principle I should need absolutely to go back tomorrow to see how you were taking it!"

Their voluminous correspondence has been published, and the letters show that the couple's affection for each other was marred by frequent quarrels. Samuel Butler once wrote: "It was very good of God to let Carlyle and Mrs. Carlyle marry one another and so make only two people miserable instead of four."

Margaret Oliphant, a personal friend of the Carlyles, opined that the marriage's "canker" came chiefly from Jane. Carlyle's biographer James Anthony Froude posthumously published his opinion, based on "gossip and rumor" circulated by Geraldine Jewsbury, that the marriage remained unconsummated. This notion was disputed by members of the Carlyle family, Oliphant, James Crichton-Browne and others.

Historian Paul Johnson notes in Creators that she not only irked her husband but made prickly comments about others. One target was fellow female writer George Eliot (Mary Ann Evans), whose decision to live openly with her married lover George Henry Lewes had scandalised London society. Seeing the pair at the theatre one evening, Jane remarked of Eliot, "Poor soul! There never was a more absurd miscalculation than her constituting herself an improper woman. She looks Propriety personified. Oh, so slow!"

Leigh Hunt's famous poem "Jenny Kiss'd Me" was inspired by Carlyle's wife. (Note: "Jenny Kiss'd Me" by Leigh Hunt: Jenny kiss'd me when we met, Jumping from the chair she sat in; Time, you thief, who love to get Sweets into your list, put that in! Say I'm weary, say I'm sad, Say that health and wealth have miss'd me, Say I'm growing old, but add, Jenny kiss'd me.)

Jane was jealous of a friendship her husband had with the socialite and hostess Lady Harriet Mary Montagu (later Lady Ashburton). Despite the platonic nature of the friendship, Jane expressed her jealousy and anger in a letter dated in 1856.

=== Relationship with Geraldine Jewsbury ===
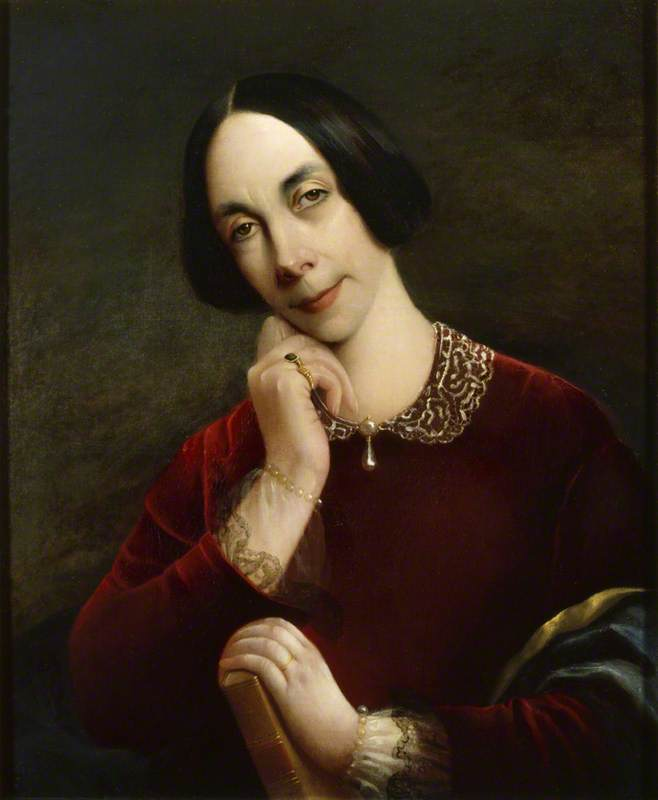
Jane Welsh Carlyle, ca. 1856, by Mrs. Paulet – National Trust, Carlyle's House; Supplied by The Public Catalogue Foundation

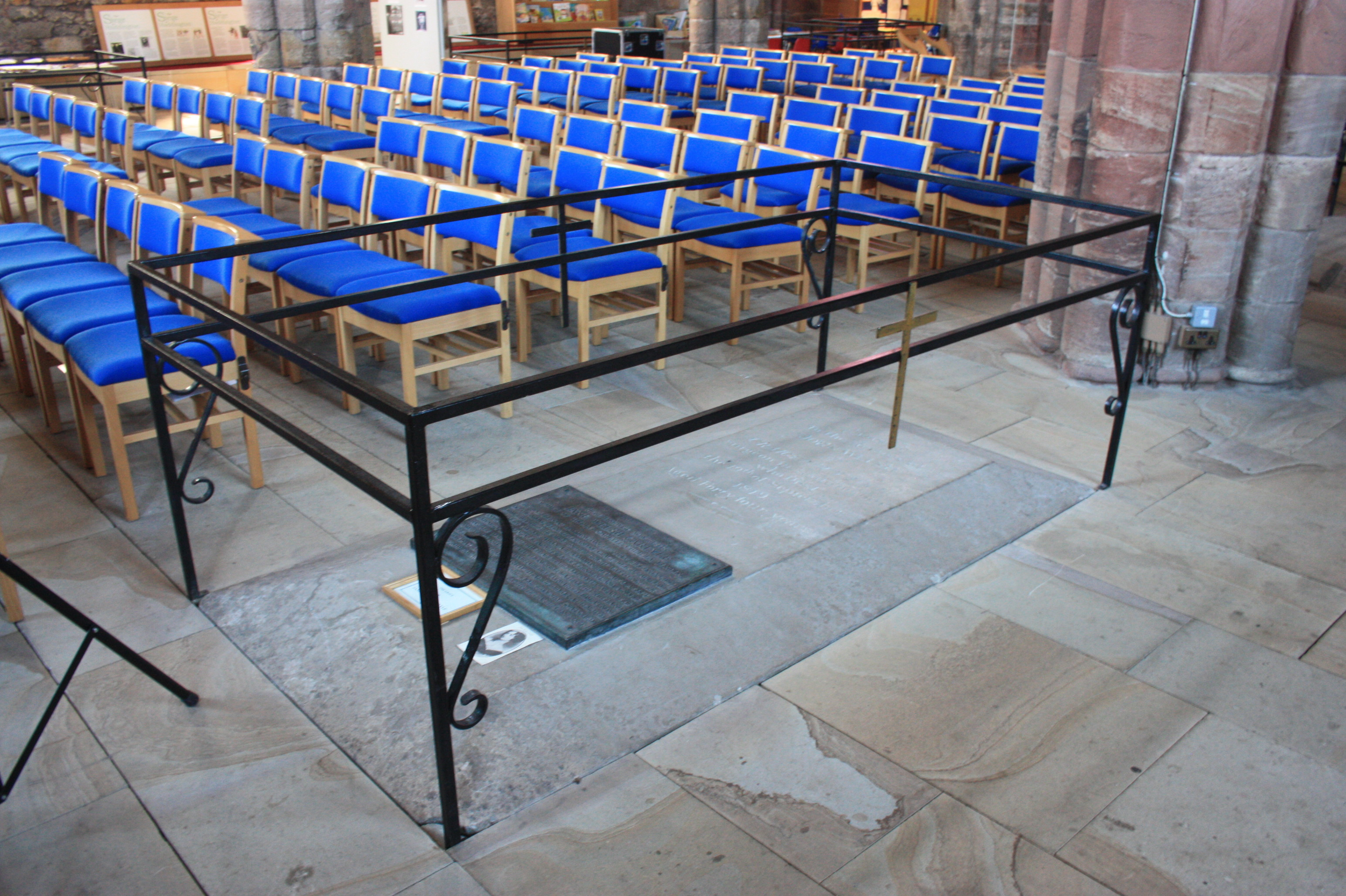
The grave of Jane Welsh Carlyle, St Mary's Church, Haddington

Jane had a long friendship and correspondence with the writer Geraldine Jewsbury. The two women first met in 1841, when Jewsbury's letters to Carlyle expressing admiration for his work and her religious doubts prompted him to extend an invitation to 5 Cheyne Row. Jewsbury was going through a depressive time, but she also contacted Thomas in the hopes of entering the literary realm in England. When Carlyle floated the idea of a second visit in 1843, Jane hesitated, finally admitting to Carlyle: "'Why I am afraid that having her beside me from morning till night would be dreadfully wearing'!" She complained of how Jewsbury was "always in a state of emotion! dropping hot tears on my hands, and watching me and fussing me". While Jane's letters were destroyed by Jewsbury in keeping with their agreement to destroy their correspondence before their deaths, Jane's sudden death prevented her from destroying Jewsbury's half. Jewsbury's letters evince her passionate feelings for Jane: "I feel towards you much more like a lover than a female friend".

They often had disagreements about common social issues of the era such as the place of men in women's lives and the purpose of women in general. Jewsbury was not opposed to marriage, but she thought man and woman should be equal in marriage; she did not witness that with the Carlyles, and criticised him for it. Jane often tried to set up Jewsbury with suitable bachelors in London. However, none of them stuck (Jewsbury never married).

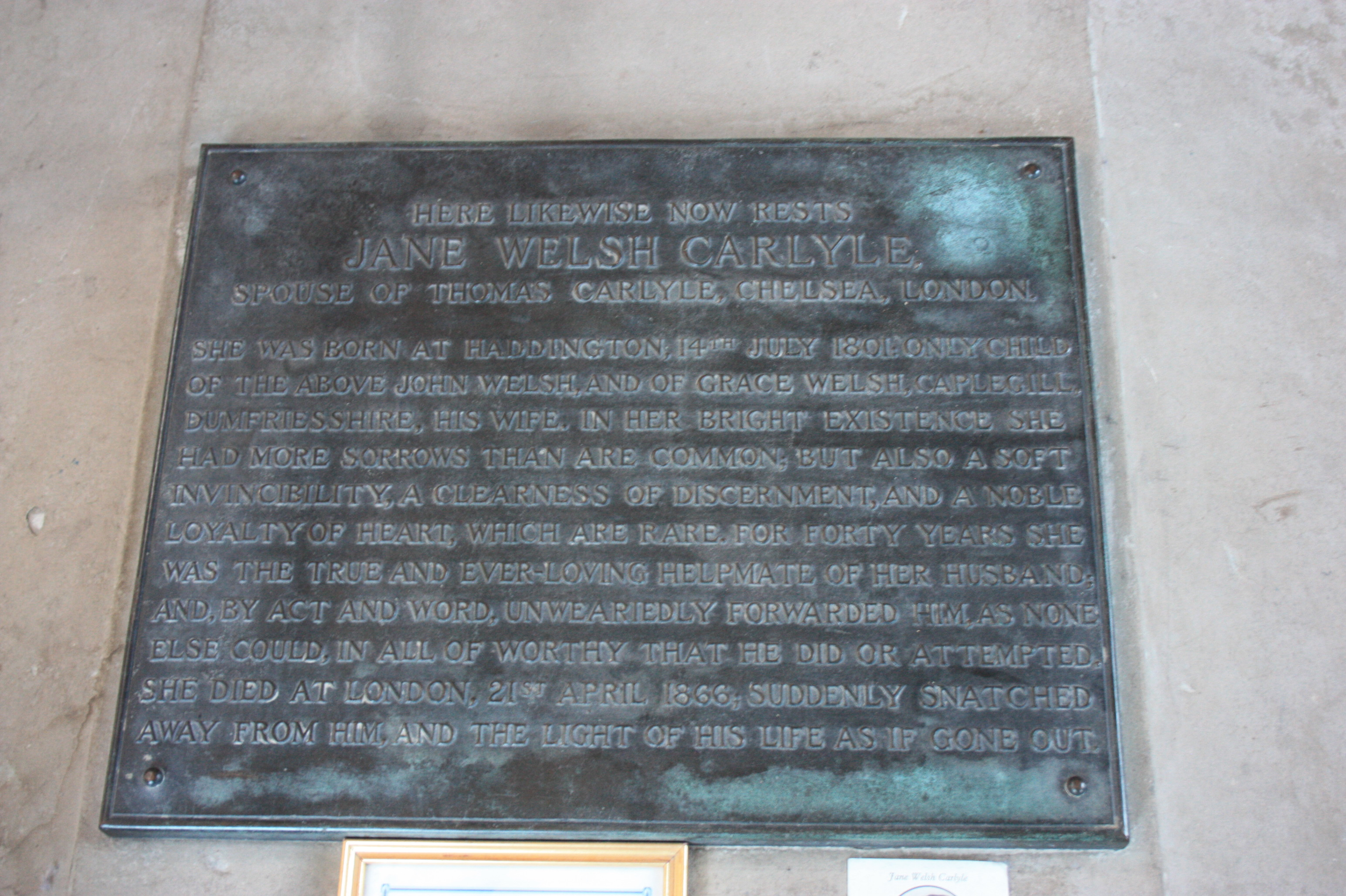
Plaque to Jane Welsh Carlyle, St Mary's, Haddington

When they were on good terms, Jane helped Jewsbury with many of her literary works, including two of Jewsbury's most popular novels, Zoe: the History of Two Lives, and The Half Sisters, which Jewsbury wanted to dedicate to her.

In 1857, Jewsbury became romantically involved with Walter Mantell, and the two women became distant. But near the end of her life, when Jane was very ill, the two reconnected. When Jane died, Jewsbury spoke of her as "the friend of my heart".

Virginia Woolf based a 1929 article in the Times Literary Supplement on Jewsbury's letters to Jane Carlyle, later published in The Second Common Reader. Their relationship was recognized among their literary peers despite the ups and downs of their friendship.

== Letters ==
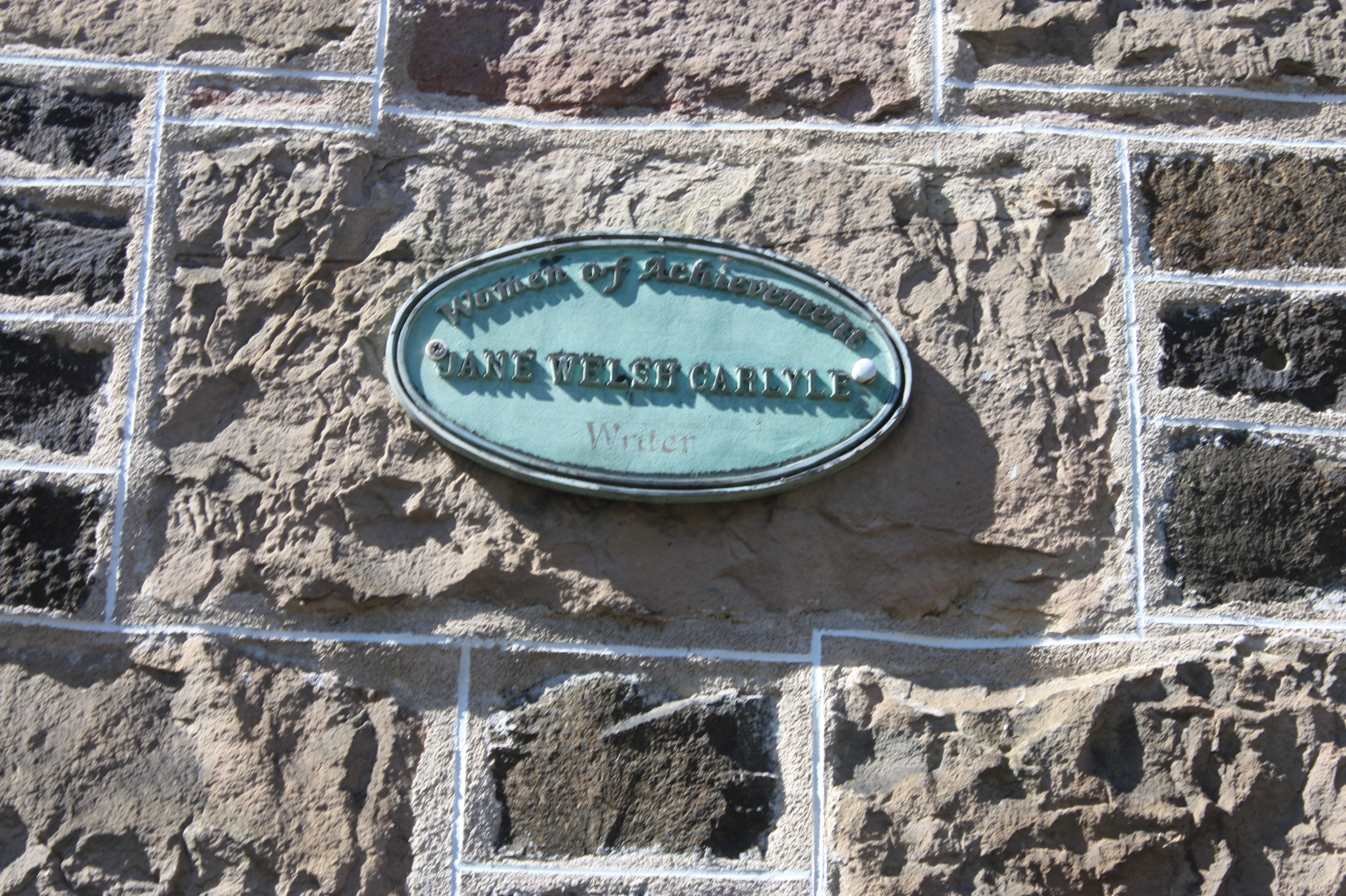
Plaque to Jane Welsh Carlyle, 23 George Square, Edinburgh

Throughout her life, Jane Carlyle valued letters. "A newspaper is very pleasant when one is expecting nothing at all; but when it comes in place of a letter it is a positive insult to one's feelings." It was her husband who established the notion of Jane as a literary talent with his oft-quoted reaction to reading her letters (8 July 1866):

The whole of yesterday I spent in reading and arranging the Letters of 1857; such a day's reading as I perhaps never had in my life before. ... Her sufferings seem little short of those in an hospital fever-ward, as she painfully drags herself about; and yet constantly there is such an electric shower of all-illuminating brilliancy, penetration, recognition, wise discernment, just enthusiasm, humour, grace, patience, courage, love,—and in fine of spontaneous nobleness of mind and intellect,—as I know not where to parallel!

He continued with an estimation of her writing talents which became the basis of claims that Jane might have been a novelist, if only she had not married him:

As to 'talent,' epistolary and other, these Letters, I perceive, equal and surpass whatever of best I know to exist in that kind; for 'talent,' 'genius,' or whatever we may call it, what an evidence, if my little woman needed that to me! Not all the Sands and Eliots and babbling cohue [band] of 'celebrated scribbling Women' that have strutted over the world, in my time, could, it seems to me, if all boiled down and distilled to essence, make one such woman.

The passages reflect Carlyle's grief in response to the content of Jane's letters. Phyllis Rose writes that "few women in history – or even literature – were more successful at making their husbands feel guilty than Jane Carlyle".

Francis Wilson writes that "Jane's letters, which have lost nothing of their freshness and mischief, take us immediately into her world, or rather into the world as she chose to construct it. She saw her letters as a roman fleuve ... in which she recorded conversations, sketched what she called 'dramas in one scene' and reshaped her days for comic effect."

The Scottish philosopher David George Ritchie, a friend of the Carlyle family, published a volume of her letters in 1889 under the title The Early Letters of Jane Welsh Carlyle. Since then a number of the Carlyle letters have been collected and published, including the multi-volume collection of the correspondence of both Jane and Thomas.

In 1973, American scholar G. B. Tennyson described her as "one of the rare Victorian wives who are of literary interest in their own right ... to be remembered as one of the great letter writers (in some respects her husband's superior) of the nineteenth century is glory beyond the dreams of avarice."

== Memorials ==
She died in London on 21 April 1866 and is buried with her father in St Mary's Collegiate Church, Haddington. The grave (railed off) stands inside the church close to the west end.

A plaque to Jane stands on the west side of George Square in Edinburgh.
