= Glossary of rhetorical terms =

Owing to its origin in ancient Greece and Rome, English rhetorical theory frequently employs Greek and Latin words as terms of art. This page explains commonly used rhetorical terms in alphabetical order. The brief definitions here are intended to serve as a quick reference rather than an in-depth discussion. For more information, click the terms.

== A ==
- Accumulatio – the emphasis or summary of previously made points or inferences by excessive praise or accusation.
- Actio – canon #5 in Cicero's list of rhetorical canons; traditionally linked to oral rhetoric, referring to how a speech is given (including tone of voice and nonverbal gestures, among others).
- Ad hominem – rebutting an argument by attacking the character, motive, or other attribute of the person making it rather than the substance of the argument itself.
- Adianoeta – a phrase carrying two meanings: an obvious meaning and a second, more subtle and ingenious one (more commonly known as double entendre).
- Alliteration – the use of a series of two or more words beginning with the same letter.
- Amphiboly – a sentence that may be interpreted in more than one way due to ambiguous structure.
- Amplification – the act and the means of extending thoughts or statements to increase rhetorical effect, to add importance, or to make the most of a thought or circumstance.
- Anacoenosis – a speaker asks his or her audience or opponents for their opinion or answer to the point in question.
- Anadiplosis – repeating the last word of one clause or phrase to begin the next.
- Analogy – the use of a similar or parallel case or example to reason or argue a point.
- Anaphora – a succession of sentences beginning with the same word or group of words.
- Anastrophe – inversion of the natural word order.
- Anecdote – a brief narrative describing an interesting or amusing event.
- Antanaclasis – a figure of speech involving a pun, consisting of the repeated use of the same word, each time with different meanings.
- Anticlimax – a bathetic collapse from an elevated subject to a mundane or vulgar one.
- Antimetabole – repetition of two words or short phrases, but in reversed order to establish a contrast. It is a specialized form of chiasmus.
- Antinomy – two ideas about the same topic that can be worked out to a logical conclusion, but the conclusions contradict each other.
- Antiptosis – type of enallage in which one grammatical case is substituted for another.
- Antistrophe – repeating the last word in successive phrases, for example, "Since the time when from our state concord disappeared, liberty disappeared, good faith disappeared, friendship disappeared, the common weal disappeared." Also see: epiphora.
- Antithesis – the juxtaposition of contrasting ideas in balanced or parallel words, phrases, or grammatical structures; the second stage of the dialectic process.
- Antonomasia – the substitution of an epithet for a proper name.
- Apophasis – pretending to deny something as a means of implicitly affirming it; as paralipsis, mentioning something by saying that you will not mention it; the opposite of occupatio.
- Aporia – a declaration of doubt, made for rhetorical purpose and often feigned.
- Aposiopesis – an abrupt stop in the middle of a sentence; used by a speaker to convey unwillingness or inability to complete a thought or statement.
- Apostrophe – a figure of speech consisting of a sudden turn in a text towards an exclamatory address to an imaginary person or a thing.
- Arete – virtue, excellence of character, qualities that would be inherent in a "natural leader", a component of ethos.
- Argument – discourse characterized by reasons advanced to support conclusions.
- Argumentum ad baculum – settling a question by appealing to force.
- Ars dictaminis – the art of writing letters, introduced and taught during the Medieval rhetorical era.
- Assonance – words that repeat the same vowel sound.
- Asyndeton – the deliberate omission of conjunctions that would normally be used.
- Audience – real, imagined, invoked, or ignored, this concept is at the very center of the intersections of composing and rhetoric.
- Aureation – the use of Latinate and polysyllabic terms to "heighten" diction.
- Auxesis – to place words or phrases in a certain order for climactic effect.
- Axioms – the point where scientific reasoning starts; principles that are not questioned.

== B ==
- Barbarism – use of a non-standard word, expression or pronunciation in a language, particularly one prescriptively regarded as an error in morphology.
- Bathos – an emotional appeal that inadvertently evokes laughter or ridicule.
- Belles lettres – written works considered to be of high quality because they are pleasing to the senses.
- Blason – the process of itemizing and describing a subject for purposes of idealization or beautifying
- Brevitas – concise expression.
- Burden of proof – theory of argument giving the obligation of proving a case to the asserting party.
- Buzzword – a word or phrase used to impress, or one that is fashionable.

== C ==
- Canon – a term often used to discuss significant literary works in a specific field, used by Cicero to outline five significant parts of the rhetorical composition process.
- Captatio benevolentiae – any literary or oral device that seeks to secure the goodwill of the recipient or hearer, as in a letter or in a discussion.
- Catachresis – the inexact use of a similar word in place of the proper one to create an unlikely metaphor; for example, "The power of man is short" or "the long wisdom in the man".
- Charisma – an attribute that allows a speaker's words to become powerful.
- Chiasmus – a figure of speech consisting of the contrasting of two structurally parallel syntactic phrases arranged "cross-wise", i.e., in such a way that the second is in reverse order from the first.
- Chreia – an anecdote (a deed, a saying, a situation) involving a well-known figure.
- Circumlocution – use of many words where a few would do.
- Classicism – a revival in the interest of classical antiquity languages and texts.
- Climax – an arrangement of phrases or topics in increasing order, as with good, better, best.
- Colon – a rhetorical figure consisting of a clause that is grammatically, but not logically, complete.
- Colloquialism – a word or phrase that is not formal or literary, typically one used in ordinary or familiar conversation.
- Common topics – arguments and approaches useful in rhetorical settings.
- Consubstantiality – substance commonality.
- Contingency – the contextual circumstances that do not allow an issue to be settled with complete certainty.
- Context – the circumstances surrounding an issue that should be considered during its discussion.

== D ==
- Deconstruction – analyzing communication artifacts by scrutinizing their meaning and related assumptions, with the goal of determining the social and systemic connotations behind their structure.
- Decorum – the appropriateness of style to subject, often divided into the grand style, the middle style, and the low style.
- Deduction – moving from an overall hypothesis to infer something specific about that hypothesis.
- Delectare – to delight; viewed by Cicero as one of the three duties of an orator.
- Dialectic – a term that has been defined differently by Aristotle and Petrus Ramus, among others; generally, it means using verbal communication to come to an agreement on a topic.
- Dispositio – the stage of planning the structure and sequence of ideas; often referred to as arrangement, the second of Cicero's five rhetorical canons.
- Dissoi logoi – contradictory arguments.
- Docere – to teach; viewed by Cicero as one of the three duties of an orator.
- Doxa – a common belief or popular opinion, usually contrasted with episteme ('knowledge').
- Dramatism – a theory developed by Kenneth Burke, according to which the world is a stage where all the people present are actors; the dramatistic pentad centers around five concepts: act, scene, agent, agency, and purpose.
- Dysphemism – a term with negative associations for something in reality fairly innocuous or inoffensive.

== E ==
- Ecphonesis – a sentence consisting of a single word or short phrase ending with an exclamation point.
- Eloquence – fluent, elegant, persuasive, and forceful speech, persuading an audience.
- Ellipse – the suppression of ancillary words to render an expression more lively or more forceful.
- Elocutio – the stage of elaborating the wording of a text, using correct grammar and diction.
- Enallage – the switching of grammatical forms for an expressive purpose.
- Enthymeme – a type of argument that is grounded in assumed commonalities between a rhetor and the audience. (For example: Claim 1: Bob is a person. Therefore, Claim 3: Bob is mortal. The assumption (unstated Claim 2) is that People are mortal). In Aristotelian rhetoric, an enthymeme is known as a "rhetorical syllogism": it mirrors the form of a syllogism, but it is based on opinion rather than fact.
- Epanalepsis – a figure of speech in which the same word or phrase appears both at the beginning and at the end of a clause.
- Epideictic – ceremonial rhetoric, such as might be found in a funeral or victory speech.
- Epistemology – philosophical study directed at understanding how people gain knowledge.
- Epistrophe – a succession of clauses, phrases or sentences that all end with the same word or group of words.
- Epithet – a term used as a descriptive and qualifying substitute for the name of a person, place or thing.
- Epizeuxis – emphasizing an idea by repeating a single word.
- Eristic – communicating with the aim of winning the argument regardless of truth.
- Erotema – rhetorical question; a question is asked to which an answer is not expected.
- Ethos – a rhetorical appeal to an audience based on the speaker/writer's credibility.
- Ethopoeia – the act of putting oneself into the character of another to convey that person's feelings and thoughts more vividly.
- Eulogy – a speech or writing in praise of a person, especially one who recently died or retired.
- Euphemism – an innocuous, inoffensive or circumlocutory term or phrase for something unpleasant or obscene—e.g., in advertising for female hygiene products any liquid shown is never red, it's usually blue.
- Exemplum – the citation of an example, either truthful or fictitious.
- Exordium – the introductory portion of an oration.

== F ==
- Fable – a short allegorical story.
- Facilitas – the improvising of effective oral or written language to suit any situation.
- Feminist rhetoric – rhetorical theory concerned with feminism and its critique of social structures.
- Figura etymologica – repetition of two etymologically related terms.
- Forensic rhetoric – speaking in a courtroom.

== G ==
- Glossophobia – the fear of public speaking, commonly referred to as speech anxiety in non-psychiatric contexts.
- Grand style – a style of rhetoric, notable for its use of figurative language and for its ability to evoke emotion.

== H ==
- Hendiadys – using two nouns linked by a conjunction to express a single complex idea.
- Hermeneutics – the theoretical underpinnings of interpreting texts, usually religious or literary.
- Heteroglossia – the use of a variety of voices or styles within one literary work or context.
- Homeoteleuton – a figure of speech where adjacent or parallel words have similar endings inside a verse, a sentence. Authors often use it to evoke music or to give a rhythm to their phrase.
- Homiletics – the application of the general principles of rhetoric to the specific art of public preaching.
- Humblebrag – a statement that purports to be modest while delivering a boast (coined by Harris Wittels).
- Hypallage – a literary device that reverses the syntactic relation of two words (as in "her beauty's face").
- Hyperbaton – a figure of speech in which words that naturally belong together are separated from each other for emphasis or effect.
- Hyperbole – a figure of speech where emphasis is achieved through exaggeration, independently or through comparison; for example, "His body was as white as snow, his face burned like fire."
- Hypophora – when a speaker asks aloud what their adversaries have to say for themselves or against the speaker, and then proceeds to answer the question. For example, "When he reminded you of your old friendship, were you moved? No, you killed him nevertheless, and with even greater eagerness. And then when his children grovelled at your feet, were you moved to pity? No, in your extreme cruelty you even prevented their father's burial."
- Hypotaxis – using subordination and connecting dependent clauses to form complex sentences; the opposite of parataxis
- Hypsos – great or worthy writing, sometimes called sublime; Longinus's theme in On the Sublime.
- Hysteron proteron – a rhetorical device in which the first key word of the idea refers to something that happens temporally later than the second key word; the goal is to call attention to the more important idea by placing it first.

== I ==
- Ideology – a way of understanding one's external surroundings.
- Ignoratio elenchi – a conclusion that is irrelevant.
- Imitatio – the practice of emulating, adapting, reworking and enriching a source text by an earlier author.
- Institutio Oratoria – educational and rhetorical principles as described and prescribed in a treatise by Quintillian.
- Inventio – described by Cicero as the process of determining "valid or seemingly valid arguments," the first of his five rhetorical canons.
- Invitational rhetoric – rhetoric involving "an invitation to understanding as a means to create a relationship rooted in quality, immanent value, and self-determination" (Foss and Griffin, 1995); it emphasizes the relationship between the speaker and freedoms of the audience to make decisions for themselves in order to promote equality.
- Ioci – humor; see Cicero's De Oratore and his theory of humor.
- Irony – a deliberate contrast between indirect and direct meaning to draw attention to the opposite.
- Isocolon – a string of phrases of corresponding structure and equal length.

== J ==
- Jargon – highly technical language used by specific group.

== K ==
- Kairos – "timing" or "the right circumstances".

== L ==
- Litotes – stating a positive by negating the negative; a form of understatement as in "I am not unaware of your difficulties."
- Logical fallacy – misconceptions resulting from faulty reasoning.
- Logos – rhetorical appeals based on logic or reasoning.
- Logology – Study of the specific theological terms used, not to find the truth or falseness of the statement, but why that particular word was chosen. (Kenneth Burke)

== M ==
- Material fallacy – false notion concerning the subject matter of an argument.
- Maxim – "A saying drawn from life, which shows concisely either what happens or ought to happen in life, for example: 'Every beginning is difficult.'"
- Meiosis – a euphemistic figure of speech that intentionally understates something or implies that it is lesser in significance or size than it really is.
- Memoria – described by Cicero as the "firm mental grasp of matter and words," the fourth of his five rhetorical canons.
- Mesodiplosis – the repetition of a word or group of words in the middle of successive clauses.
- Metaphor – a figure of speech where a word that normally applies to one thing is used to designate another for the sake of creating a mental picture, for example, "he lightly breathed a favoring breath".
- Metonymy – a figure of speech that substitutes one word or phrase for another with which it is closely associated. For example, in UK, people speak of "Crown property" meaning property belonging to the State. Similarly: "The White House had no comment to make."
- Minor premise – statement in an argument.
- Moral reasoning – reasoning employed in rhetoric that determines a conclusion based on evidence; used in issues of ethics, religion, economics, and politics.
- Movere – to persuade; viewed by Cicero as one of the three duties of an orator.

== N ==
- Narration – story telling, involving the elements of time, place, actor, action, cause and manner.
- Noema – speech that is deliberately subtle or obscure.
- Non sequitur – a statement bearing no relationship to the preceding context.

== O ==
- Onomatopoeia – words that imitate the sounds, objects, or actions they refer to, for example "buzz", "hullabaloo", "bling".
- Opening statement – first part of discourse; should gain audiences' attention.
- Orator – a public speaker, especially one who is eloquent or skilled.
- Oxymoron – opposed or markedly contradictory terms joined for emphasis.

== P ==
- Panegyric – a formal public speech, delivered in high praise of a person or thing.
- Paradeigma – argument created by a list of examples that leads to a probable generalized idea.
- Paradiastole – redescription, usually in a better light.
- Paradox – an apparently absurd or self-contradictory statement or proposition.
- Paralipsis – a form of apophasis when a rhetor introduces a subject by denying it should be discussed. To speak of someone or something by claiming not to.
- Parallelism – the correspondence, in sense or construction, of successive clauses or passages.
- Parallel syntax – repetition of similar sentence structures.
- Paraprosdokian – a sentence in which the latter half takes an unexpected turn.
- Parataxis – using juxtaposition of short, simple sentences to connect ideas, as opposed to explicit conjunction.
- Parenthesis – an explanatory or qualifying word, clause, or sentence inserted into a passage that is not essential to the literal meaning.
- Parody – comic imitation of something or somebody.
- Paronomasia – a pun, a play on words, often for humorous effect.
- Pathos – the emotional appeal to an audience in an argument; one of Aristotle's three proofs.
- Periphrasis – the substitution of many or several words where one would suffice; usually to avoid using that particular word.
- Personification – a figure of speech that gives human characteristics to inanimate objects, or represents an absent person as being present. For example, "But if this invincible city should now give utterance to her voice, would she not speak as follows?"
- Petitio – in a letter, an announcement, demand, or request.
- Philippic – a fiery, damning speech, delivered to condemn a particular political actor; the term is derived from Demosthenes's speeches in 351 BC denouncing the imperialist ambitions of Philip of Macedon, which later came to be known as The Philippics.
- Phronesis – practical wisdom; common sense.
- Pistis – the elements to induce true judgment through enthymemes, hence to give proof of a statement.
- Pleonasm – the use of more words than necessary to express an idea.
- Polyptoton – the repetition of a word or root in different cases or inflections within the same sentence.
- Polysemy – the capacity of a word or phrase to render more than one meaning.
- Polysyndeton – the repeated use of conjunctions within a sentence, particularly where they do not necessarily have to be used.
- Postmodernism – a field of inquiry concerned with the ideological underpinnings of commonly held assumptions.
- Pragmatism – approach based on practical consideration and immediate perception to the exclusion of moral (in the sense of 'should') and ethic arguments.
- Praise sandwich – delivering criticism together with praise.
- Priamel – a series of compared alternatives which serve as foils to the true subject of a poem.
- Procatalepsis – in argumentation, the speaker answers the opponent's possible objections before they can be made.
- Progymnasmata – a series of preliminary rhetorical exercises that began in ancient Greece and continued during the Roman Empire.
- Prosopopoeia – speaking as another person or object.
- Pronuntiatio – the delivery of an oration or an argument in a manner befitting the subject matter and style, while maintaining control of voice and body.
- Protreptic – the potential to persuade through language.

== Q ==
- Quadrivium – the major subjects taught in medieval times: geometry, arithmetic, astronomy, and music.

== R ==
- Repetition – the repeating of a word for emphasis.
- Rhetor – a person who is in the course of presenting or preparing rhetorical discourse.
- Rhetoric – the study and practice of good effective expression; also a type of discourse, focusing on goals of the speech or piece of writing that attempts to sway the mind of the audience.
- Rhetorical criticism – analysis of the symbolic artifacts of discourse—the words, phrases, images, gestures, performances, texts, films, etc. that people use to communicate; there are many different forms of rhetorical criticism.
- Rhetorical question – a question asked to make a point instead of to elicit a direct answer.
- Rhetorical situation – a term made popular by Lloyd Bitzer; it describes the scenario that contains a speech act, including the considerations (purpose, audience, author/speaker, constraints to name a few) that play a role in how the act is produced and perceived by its audience; the counterargument regarding Bitzer's situation-rhetoric relationship was made by Richard Vatz, who argued for a salience-meaning (or now, agenda-framing-spin) model of persuasion, which emphasized rhetoric as a creative act with increased agent or persuader responsibility for the situation his or her rhetoric creates.

== S ==
- Salon – intellectual assembly in an aristocratic setting; primarily associated with France in the 17th and 18th centuries.
- Scholasticism – rhetorical study of Christianity that was intellectually prominent in 11th–15th-century Western Europe, emphasizing rhetorical concepts by Aristotle and a search for universal truth.
- Schesis onomaton - either a sentence constructed only of nouns and adjectives, a series of synonyms used for emphasis, or both.
- Scientism – applying scientific assumptions to subjects that are not completely natural.
- Second Sophistic – rhetorical era in Rome that dealt primarily with rhetorical style through some of the Greek Sophists' concepts, while neglecting its political and social uses because of censorship.
- Semantics – philosophical study of language that deals with its connection to perceptions of reality.
- Semiotics – branch of semantics concerning language and communication as a system of symbols.
- Sensus communis – a society's basic beliefs and values.
- Sententia – applying a general truth to a situation by quoting a maxim or other wise saying as a conclusion or summary of that situation.
- Sermocinatio – dialogue presented in the first person as a dramatic presentation of what was supposedly said
- Simile – a figure of speech that compares unlike things, implying a resemblance between them, for example, "He entered the combat in body like the strongest bull, in impetuosity like the fiercest lion."
- Solecism – ignorantly misusing tenses, cases, and genders.
- Sophists – considered the first professional teachers of oratory and rhetoric (ancient Greece 4th century BC).
- Spin – the act of competing to infuse meaning into agenda items for chosen audiences.
- Spoonerism – the deliberate or involuntary switching of sounds or morphemes between two words of a phrase, rendering a new meaning.
- Sprezzatura – the ability to appear that there is seemingly little effort used to attain success; the art of being able to show that one is able to deceive.
- Straw man – an argument that is a logical fallacy based on misrepresentation of an opponent's position.
- Studia humanitatis – humanistic studies deemed indispensable in Renaissance-era education; rhetoric, poetics, ethics, politics.
- Syllogism – a type of valid argument that states if the first two claims are true, then the conclusion is true. (For example: Claim 1: People are mortal. Claim 2: Bob is a person. Therefore, Claim 3: Bob is mortal.) Coined by Aristotle.
- Symbol – a visual or metaphorical representation of an idea or concept.
- Symploce – a figure of speech in which several successive clauses have the same first and last words.
- Synathroesmus – a rhetorical device involving the listing, typically to emphasize emotion
- Synchysis – word order confusion within a sentence.
- Synecdoche – a rhetorical device where one part of an object is used to represent the whole—e.g., "There are fifty head of cattle." or "Show a leg!" (naval command to get out of bed = show yourself)

== T ==
- Taste – a learned admiration for things of beauty.
- Tautology – the same idea repeated in different words.
- Techne – a true art.
- Technobabble – use of technical terms or jargon to try to win a point by confusing the opposition or by attempting to intimidate by suppressing admission of ignorance by the opposition.
- Terministic screens – a term coined by Kenneth Burke to explain the way in which the world is viewed when taking languages and words into consideration.
- Tmesis – separating the parts of a compound word by a different word (or words) to create emphasis or other similar effects.
- Topos – a line or specific type of argument.
- Toulmin model – a method of diagramming arguments created by Stephen Toulmin that identifies such components as backing, claim, data, qualifier, rebuttal, and warrant.
- Tricolon – the pattern of three phrases in parallel, found commonly in Western writing after Cicero—for example, the kitten had white fur, blue eyes, and a pink tongue.
- Trivium – grammar, rhetoric, and logic taught in schools during the medieval period.
- Tropes – a figure of speech that uses a word aside from its literal meaning.

== U ==
- Understatement – a form of irony, sometimes in the form of litotes, in which something is represented as less than it really is, with the intent of drawing attention to and emphasizing the opposite meaning.
- Universal audience – an audience consisting of all humankind.
- Utterance – statement that could contain meaning about one's own person.

== V ==
- Validity – apprehension over the structure of an argument.
- Vir bonus dicendi peritus – the good man skilled at speaking well.
- Visual rhetoric – a theoretical framework describing how visual images, typography, and texts communicate, as opposed to aural or verbal messages.

== Z ==
- Zeugma – a figure of speech in which one word applies to two others in different senses of that word, and in some cases only logically applies to one of the other two words.
