= Enallage =

Scheme in rhetorical speech

Enallage (/ɛˈnælədʒiː/; Greek: ἐναλλαγή, enallagḗ 'interchange') is one type of scheme of rhetorical figures of speech which is used to refer to the use of tense, form, or person for a grammatically incorrect counterpart.

== Form ==
One use of enallage is to give a sentence improper form quite deliberately. Shakespeare wrote, "Is there not wars? Is there not employment?" (2nd Henry IV, I, ii) In these cases, he uses enallage to achieve parallel structure. Byron stated, "The idols are broke in the temple of Baal." Here he used the past tense form of break instead of the past participle, broken, which should have been used. In the opening lines of the Aeneid, Virgil speaks of the "walls of lofty Rome". Daniel Mendelsohn, in The New Yorker, cites this as an example of enallage: "The poet knew what he was doing—'lofty walls' is about architecture, but 'lofty Rome' is about empire," though arguably this figure could be considered hypallage, the transposition of the natural relations of two elements in a proposition.

Another noted example is when professional prize fight manager Joe Jacobs cried, We was robbed!, after his fighter lost a decision in 1932. Through this utterance, Arthur Quinn claimed Jacobs "achieved for himself linguistic immortality."

Apple's advertising slogan "Think different" can be viewed as a deliberately incorrect grammatical construction.

== See also ==
- Antiptosis
- Be Best

== Bibliography ==
- Holy Bible: Concordance. World Publishing Company: Cleveland.
- Cuddon, J.A., ed. The Penguin Dictionary of Literary Terms and Literary Theory. 3rd ed. Penguin Books: New York, 1991.
- Spendlove, Loren Blake (2014). "Limhi's Discourse: Proximity and Distance in Teaching". Interpreter: A Journal of Mormon Scripture. 8: 1–6. Archived from the original on 26 April 2014.
