= Accumulatio =

Figure of speech

Accumulatio, also called accumulation, is a figure of speech, part of the more general group of enumeratio, in which the previously-made statements are represented, typically in a compact, forceful manner. Accumulatio describes a gathering of either praise or criticism to emphasize previous discourse. It often uses a climax for the summation of a speech.

== Etymology ==
Accumulatio in Latin, is a noun that directly translate to "accumulation, heaping, piling up;" the Latin noun derives from the verb accumulare ("to amass") from -ad, a prefix meaning "to," and cumulare, meaning "to heap" (from cumulus, a heap). It is a doublet with the word "accumulation."

== Rhetorical use ==
Accumulatio is used to emphasize, summarize, or strengthen an argument's point; this may be used to overwhelm the reader with evidence towards a centralized point, to showcase the multifacetedness of an issue, or to clarify a point. Accumulatio often helps build tension towards a climax or other moment. The joining of similar words in close proximity can be used to intensify a thought or feeling.

Accumulatio is a type of (or is synonymous with) congeries (from Latin "heap, pile") which involves the piling up of words and phrases which may or may not be synonymous. The term "congeries" does not necessarily have the connotation of accumulating previous arguments; for example, in The American Crisis, Thomas Paine refers to someone's character as being that of "a sottish, stupid, stubborn, worthless, brutish man;" an example of a congeries.

Accumulatio is often combined with anaphora to preface each element in the accumulated list.

This stylistic device is frequently used among stream-of-consciousness writers, such as James Joyce and Virginia Woolf.

== Examples ==
- In a speech by Winston Churchill on July 14, 1941, he says, "Your organization, your vigilance, your devotion to duty, your zeal for the cause must be raised to the highest intensity." (Note: This sentence comes after a lengthy passage in which Churchill warns the public that their courage and effort are still needed to defeat the enemy) Note the use of anaphora with the use of "your."
- As an example of accumulatio in Book 4 of Rhetorica ad Herennium: "From what vice, I ask, is this defendant free? What ground have you for wishing to acquit him of the suit? He is the betrayer of his own self respect, and the waylayer of the self-respect of others; covetous, intemperate, irascible, arrogant; disloyal to his parents, ungrateful to his friends, troublesome to his kin; insulting to his betters, disdainful of his equals and mates, cruel to his inferiors; in short he is intolerable to every one." (Note: In Latin: Suae pudicitiae proditor est, insidiator alienae; cupidus intemperans, petulans superbus; impius in parentes, ingratus in amicos, infestus cognatis; in superiores contumax, in aequos et pares fastidiosus, in inferiores crudelis; denique in omnes intolerabilis)
- The slogan for Canterbury Church is an example of accumulatio: "St. Augustine founded it. Becket died for it. Chaucer wrote about it. Cromwell shot at it. Hitler bombed it. Time is destroying it. Will you save it?"
- In All's Well that Ends Well, a Lord accumulates vices towards another character: "he's a most notable coward, an infinite and endless liar, an hourly promise breaker, the owner of no one good quality."

== See also ==
- Glossary of rhetorical terms
- Climax
- Congeries
- Figure of speech
