= Scheme (rhetoric) =

Figure of speech that relies on the structure and syntax of sentences

In rhetoric, a scheme is a type of literary device that relies on the structure of a whole sentence, unlike a "trope", figurative wording that plays with the meanings of words.

A single phrase may involve both a trope and a scheme, e.g., may use both alliteration and allegory.

== Structures of balance ==
- Parallelism – The use of similar structures in two or more clauses
  - Isocolon – Use of parallel structures of the same length in successive clauses
  - Tricolon – Use of three parallel structures of the same length in independent clauses and of increasing power
- Antithesis – The juxtaposition of opposing or contrasting ideas
- Climax – The arrangement of words in order of increasing importance

== Changes in word order ==
- Anastrophe – Inversion of the usual word order
- Parenthesis – Insertion of a clause or sentence in a place where it interrupts the natural flow of the sentence
- Apposition – The placing of two elements side by side, in which the second defines the first

== Omission ==
- Ellipsis – Omission of words
- Asyndeton – Omission of conjunctions between related clauses
- Brachylogia – Omission of conjunctions between a series of words

== Repetition ==
- Alliteration – A series of words that begin with the same letter or sound alike
- Anaphora – The repetition of the same word or group of words at the beginning of successive clauses
- Anadiplosis – Repetition of a word at the end of a clause at the beginning of another
- Antanaclasis – Repetition of a word in two different senses
- Antimetabole – Repetition of words in successive clauses, in reverse order
- Assonance – The repetition of vowel sounds, most commonly within a short passage of verse
- Asyndeton – Lack of conjunctions
- Chiasmus – Reversal of grammatical structures in successive clauses
- Climax – Repetition of the scheme anadiplosis at least three times, with the elements arranged in an order of increasing importance
- Epanalepsis – Repetition of the initial word or words of a clause or sentence at the end of the clause or sentence
- Epistrophe – The counterpart of anaphora: the repetition occurs at the end of successive clauses.
- Consonance – The repetition of consonant sounds without the repetition of the vowel sounds
- Polyptoton – Repetition of words derived from the same root
- Polysyndeton – Repetition of conjunctions
- Symploce – Combination of anaphora and epistrophe

== See also ==
- Trope (linguistics)
- The Elements of Eloquence
- Glossary of rhetorical terms
