= Is the Pope Catholic? =

Is the Pope Catholic? may refer to:

- "Is the Pope Catholic?", a common rhetorical question, used to mean an emphatic yes
- Sedevacantism, the view by some Traditionalist Catholics that the pope is not the true head of the Catholic Church
