= Synathroesmus =

Rhetorical device involving listing

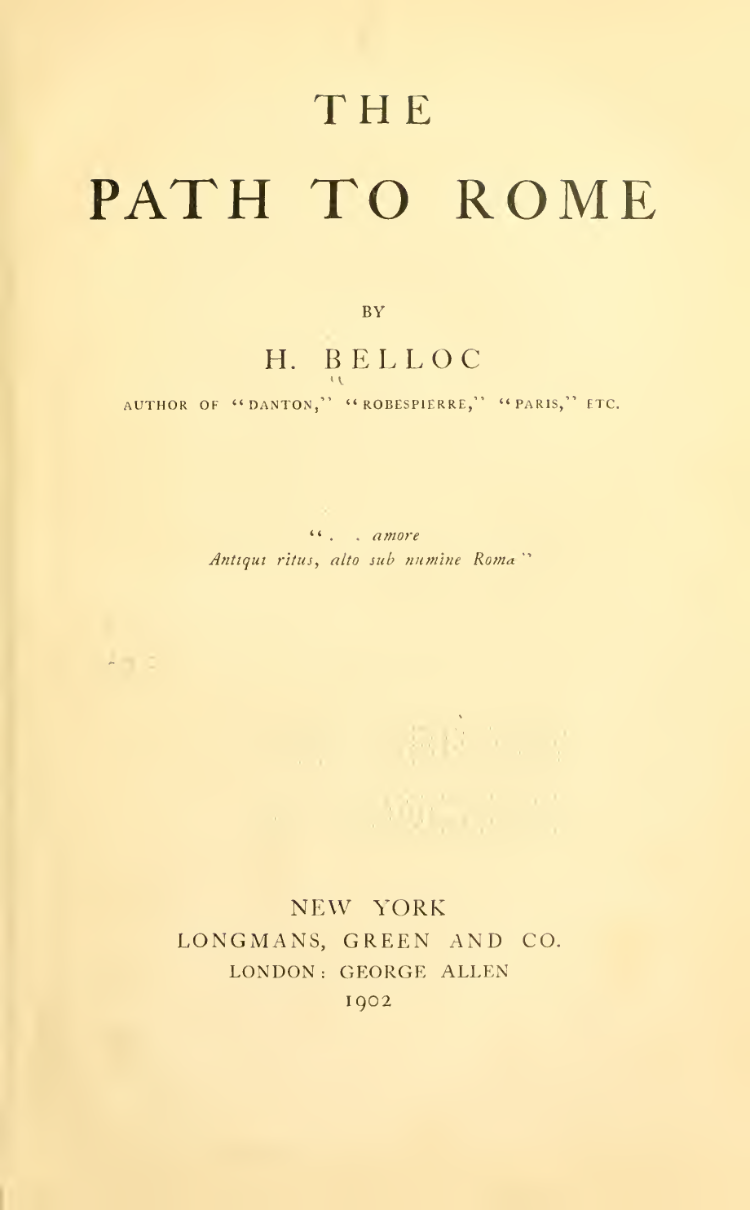
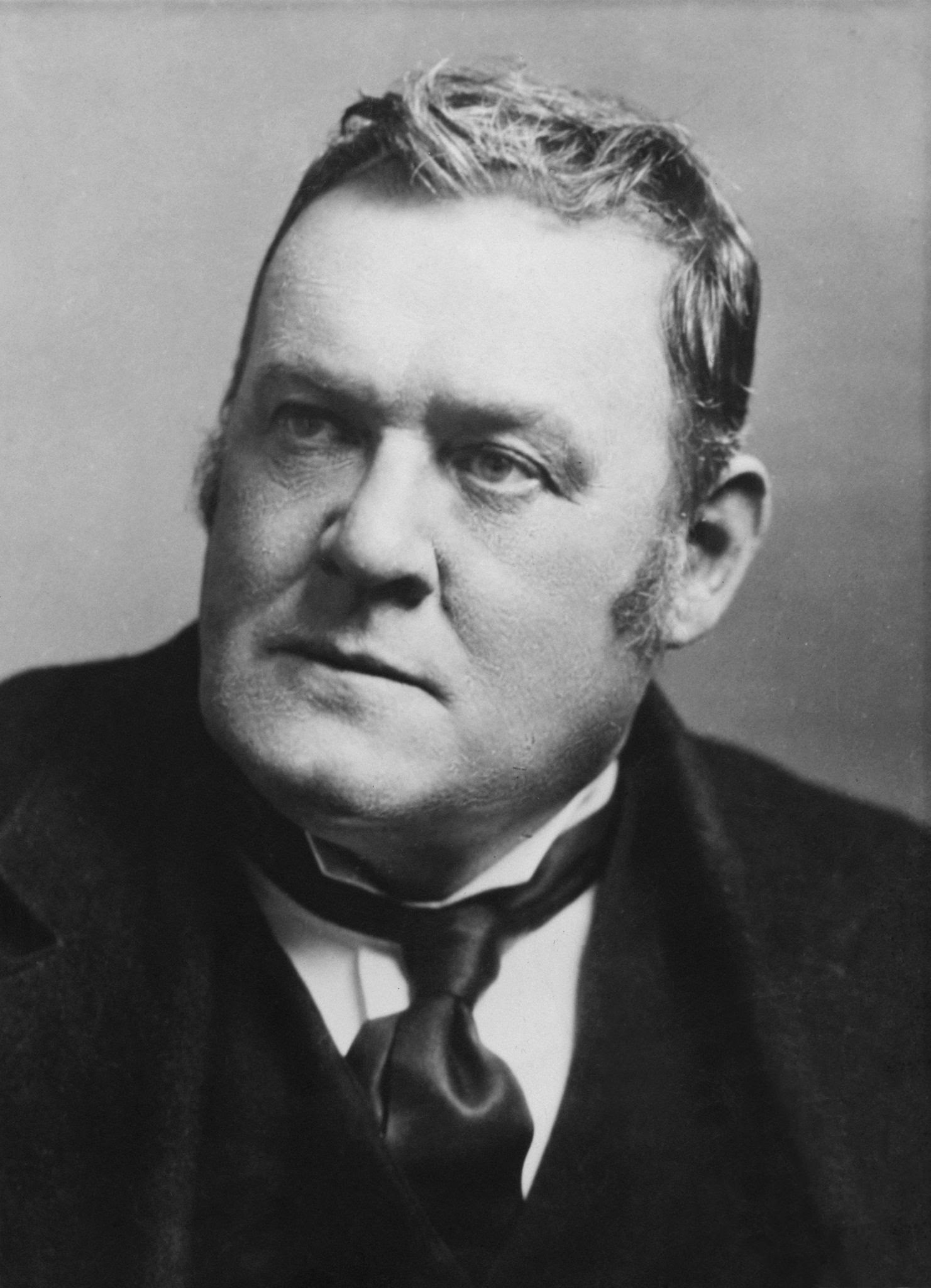
In The Path to Rome, Belloc makes frequent use of synathroesmuses, often for humorous effect (see examples).

Synathroesmus (sin-ath-RES-mus) is a rhetorical device which involves the collection or listing of words, often adjectives, in a list; it also may be spelled synathroismos or sinathrismus and is also referred to as frequentatio or the heaping figure. The gathered words may or may not be synonyms and may involve the collection of previous phrases or ideas from an oral or written work. Often, synathroesmus is used invectively: to emphasize blame or negative traits.

== Etymology ==
Synathroesmus is derived from Greek synathroismos (Greek: συναθροισμός; "a collection, union")

== Rhetorical use ==
Synathroesmus, being a collection of like terms, is meant to emphasize a description of the subject. When the subject is an inanimate object, synathroesmus may enliven it and create vivid imagery. The piling up of descriptions can accentuate a cumulative favoring or disfavoring towards its subject; in the latter case, where is it a heap of insults, it is referred to as bdelygmia

According to Mark Forsyth, part of the effectiveness of such listings is because of their unnaturalness in normal oral language which emphasizes imagery or tone in a manner unfound in human speech: "Nobody but a God or a fool talks in lists."

== Examples ==
- "Let them call me rebel, and welcome, I feel no concern from it; but I should suffer the misery of devils were I to make a whore of my soul by swearing allegiance to one whose character is that of a sottish, stupid, stubborn, worthless, brutish man" — Thomas Paine, The American Crisis, Number 1
- "a proud, haughty, consequential, turned-up-nose peacock" — Charles Dickens, "Nicholas Nickleby,"
- "The cloud-capp'd towers, the gorgeous palaces, / The solemn temples, the great globe itself" — William Shakespeare, The Tempest
- "He is an harlot of his own body, he lies in wait for others, greedy, intemperate, wanton, proud, unnatural to his parents, unkind to his friends, troublesome to his kinsfolk, stubborn to his betters, disdainful to his equals, cruel to his inferiors, finally, intolerable to all men" (archaic spelling modernized) — Richard Sherry, A Treatise of Schemes and Scopes
- "So this threat about the heavy task of beginning breeds discouragement, anger, vexation, irritability, bad style, pomposity and infinitives split from helm to saddle, and metaphors mixed as the Carlton" — Hilaire Belloc, The Path to Rome
- "I see. You would not pile words one on the other, qualifying, exaggerating, conditioning, superlative, diminishing, connecting, amplifying, condensing, mouthing, and glorifying the mere sound: you would be terse" — Hilaire Belloc, The Path to Rome

== Types ==
Synathroesmus is a broad rhetorical category that describes types of listings; those subcategories include the following:

=== Synonymia ===
Synonymia is synathroesmus in which the listed terms are synonymous with each other with the purpose of emphasizing emotional meaning or increasing clarity.

For example, in Julius Caesar, a Roman tribune named Marullus insults the Caesar-supporting Romans by exclaiming, "You blocks, you stones, you worse than senseless things!" This bdelygmia is an example of synonymia because it involves repeated synonyms and aims to intensify the pejorative name-calling.

Synonymia comes from Latin synōnymia which was borrowed from sunōnumía (Greek: συνωνυμία) which comes from sunṓnumos (Greek: συνώνυμος; "of like name" ) and the noun-forming -ία suffix. Ultimately, the word derives from syn- (Greek: σῠν-; alike, same) and onyma (Greek: ὄνομα / ὄνυμα; "name").

=== Congeries ===
Congeries refers to synathroesmus involving words of differing meaning— though this distinction is not always made, and congeries may be viewed as synonymous with synathroesmus or the same as synonymia. While its constituents may not be synonymous, the elements of a congeries typically invoke the same meaning.

Galatians 5:22–23 is an example of a congeries: "But the fruit of the Spirit is love, joy, peace, forbearance, kindness, goodness, faithfulness, gentleness and self-control. Against such things there is no law" Note how the individual nouns used to described the "fruit of the Spirit" are diverse and non-synonymous, but, nonetheless, have the same positive connotation.

Congeries, in English, literally means a collection or heap. The term is derived from Latin congeries ("heap, pile") which comes from the verb congerere ("to pile up") from con- ("with, together") and gerere ("to carry"). Congeries is an invariant noun as its singular is identical to the plural.

=== Accumulatio ===
Accumulatio, unlike the former two, involves the culmination of previously stated points or arguments via synathroesmus. It is often used to summarize, emphasize, or strengthen the main points of an argument.

The fourth book of Rhetorica ad Herennium provides an example of accumulatio in a courtroom argument: "From what vice, I ask, is this defendant free? What ground have you for wishing to acquit him of the suit? He is the betrayer of his own self respect, and the waylayer of the self-respect of others; covetous, intemperate, irascible, arrogant; disloyal to his parents, ungrateful to his friends, troublesome to his kin; insulting to his betters, disdainful of his equals and mates, cruel to his inferiors; in short he is intolerable to every one." Accumulatio, unlike some other uses of synathroesmus, draws from previously made arguments but has a similar rhetorical structure of listing elements in order to emphasize a point.

Accumlatio, sometimes anglicized as "accumulation" (which is also its doublet), is derived directly from its homonymous Latin noun meaning "accumulation, heaping, piling up" which comes from the verb accumulare ("to amass") which further is derived from the prefix -ad, ("to") and cumulare ("to heap;" from noun cumulus: "a heap").
