= Catacosmesis =

Greek word and rhetorical device

Catacosmesis is the Greek word for "to set in order". In rhetoric, it refers to a device in which there is a descending order of words or phrases, either in order of importance, dignity or time, and either abrupt or gradual. It is considered to be synonymous with anticlimax. The opposite of catacosmesis is auxesis when used to refer to climax, wherein a series of clauses has increasing, rather than decreasing, force. Catacosmesis is distinct from bathos because the former is a relative term, requiring that a phrase or word is proceeded by something greater in dignity, time, or some other metric, whereas bathos may apply to an entire work, text, or speech, with no major changes in dignity.

An example of catacosmesis is:

I die, I faint, I fail.

— Percy Bysshe Shelley, The Indian Serenade

Here, the verbs "die", "faint", and "fail" are arranged such that the most important of them (die) is first and the least important (fail) last.

Another example of catacosmesis is the Yale University motto:

For God, for country, and for Yale.

Here, the nouns "God", "country", and "Yale" are ordered so that the most important (God) is first and the least important (Yale) last.

Catacosmesis may also be used for humorous statements due to the juxtaposition of phrases leading to the anticlimax, as in the following statements:

He has seen the ravages of war, he has known natural catastrophes, he has been to singles bars.

— Woody Allen

She says she doesn't want you here when she gets back because you've been ruining everybody's lives and eating all our steak!

— Napoleon Dynamite

== See also ==
- Anticlimax
- Auxesis, the opposite device, in which clauses increase in force
- Climax, the specific form of auxesis which serves as the opposite of catacosmesis
- Rhetoric
- Rhetorical Device
