= Exemplar =

An exemplar is a person, a place, an object, or some other entity that serves as a predominant example of a given concept (e.g. "The heroine became an exemplar in courage to the children"). It may also refer to:

- Exemplar, a well-known science problem and its solution, from Thomas Kuhn's The Structure of Scientific Revolutions
- Exemplar, the first name for the ship USS Dorothea L. Dix (AP-67)
- Exemplar, in exemplification theory, an illustrative representation of information or an event
- Exemplar, a series of parallel-computing machines introduced in 1994 by Convex Computer
- Exemplar (textual criticism), the text used to produce another version of the text
- Handwriting exemplar, a writing sample that can be examined forensically
- Exemplar theory, in psychology, a theory about how humans categorize objects and ideas
- Exemplars (comics), a fictional group of eight humans in the Marvel Comics universe
- Exemplars of Evil, an accessory to the 3.5 edition of Dungeons & Dragons that shows how to build memorable villains
- The Twenty-four Filial Exemplars, a classic text of Confucian filial piety written by Guo Jujing during the Yuan dynasty

== See also ==
- Example (disambiguation)
- Exemplum, a moral anecdote used to illustrate a point
- Role model
