= Candaon =

Thracian god identified with Ares

In Greek mythology, Candaon is a rare name of uncertain meaning. In the Alexandra of Lycophron, a long and obscure poem, there is a reference to a human sacrifice conducted with the "three-fathered sword of Candaon". The scholia to Lycophron explain this as a transferred epithet: Candaon is Orion, who was begotten, in a curious manner, by Zeus, Hermes and Poseidon.

It is not clear from the context whether the sacrifice is that of Polyxena by Neoptolemus or that of Iphigeneia by Agamemnon. In the first case, Candaon would be Hephaestus, who made the sword for Peleus, who gave it to Neoptolemus. In the second, "three-fathered" refers to the generations of the Atreidae; Agamemnon's sword is likely to have as long a narrative attached to it as his staff. Candaon may still be Orion; Pelops may well have acquired his sword. Enrico Livrea suggests that both interpretations are correct, and the ambiguity of the section is intentional.

Lycophron refers to Candaon again, as worshipped by the Crestonian Thracians. This time the scholiasts identify Candaon with Ares, and derive the name from καίειν "kindle" (or καίνειν "kill") and δαίειν "blaze", which is still plausible for Candaon as Hephaestus.

== See also ==
- List of Greek deities
