= ZB =

ZB or Zb may refer to:

== Businesses and organisations ==
- Monarch Airlines (IATA code ZB)
- Zbrojovka Brno, a Czech producer of small weapons and munitions
- Zentralbahn, a Swiss railway
- Zentralblatt MATH, now zbMATH, international mathematics article reviewing service

== Computing ==
- Zettabit (Zb), a unit of information used, for example, to quantify computer memory or storage capacity
- Zettabyte (ZB), a unit of information used, for example, to quantify computer memory or storage capacity

== Other uses ==
- MG Magnette ZB, the second iteration of the MG saloon of the 1950s
- Newstalk ZB, a national talkback station in New Zealand, whose callsign is ZB
- Codename of the 2003 to 2006 and 2008 to 2010 Dodge Viper
- ZB conference, on the Z notation and B-Method, co-organized by the Z User Group and APCB
- ZB Holden Commodore an Australian version of the Opel Insignia
- ZB method for speedcubing to solve the Rubik’s cube

== See also ==
- Example (disambiguation), (German: zum Beispiel or z. B.)
