= Apophatic =

Apophatic may refer to:

- Apophasis, a rhetoric device whereby the speaker raises something by denying it
- Apophatic theology, a way of describing the divine by explaining what God is not
