= Byword =

Byword may refer to:

- Byword (horse), a thoroughbred racehorse and sire from the United Kingdom
- Byword (saying), a simple and concrete saying, popularly known and repeated, which expresses a truth based on common sense or practical experience (e.g. "a good byword to live by is 'prudence', especially when younger")

== See also ==
- Example (disambiguation)
