= Hendiadys =

Conjunction for emphasis

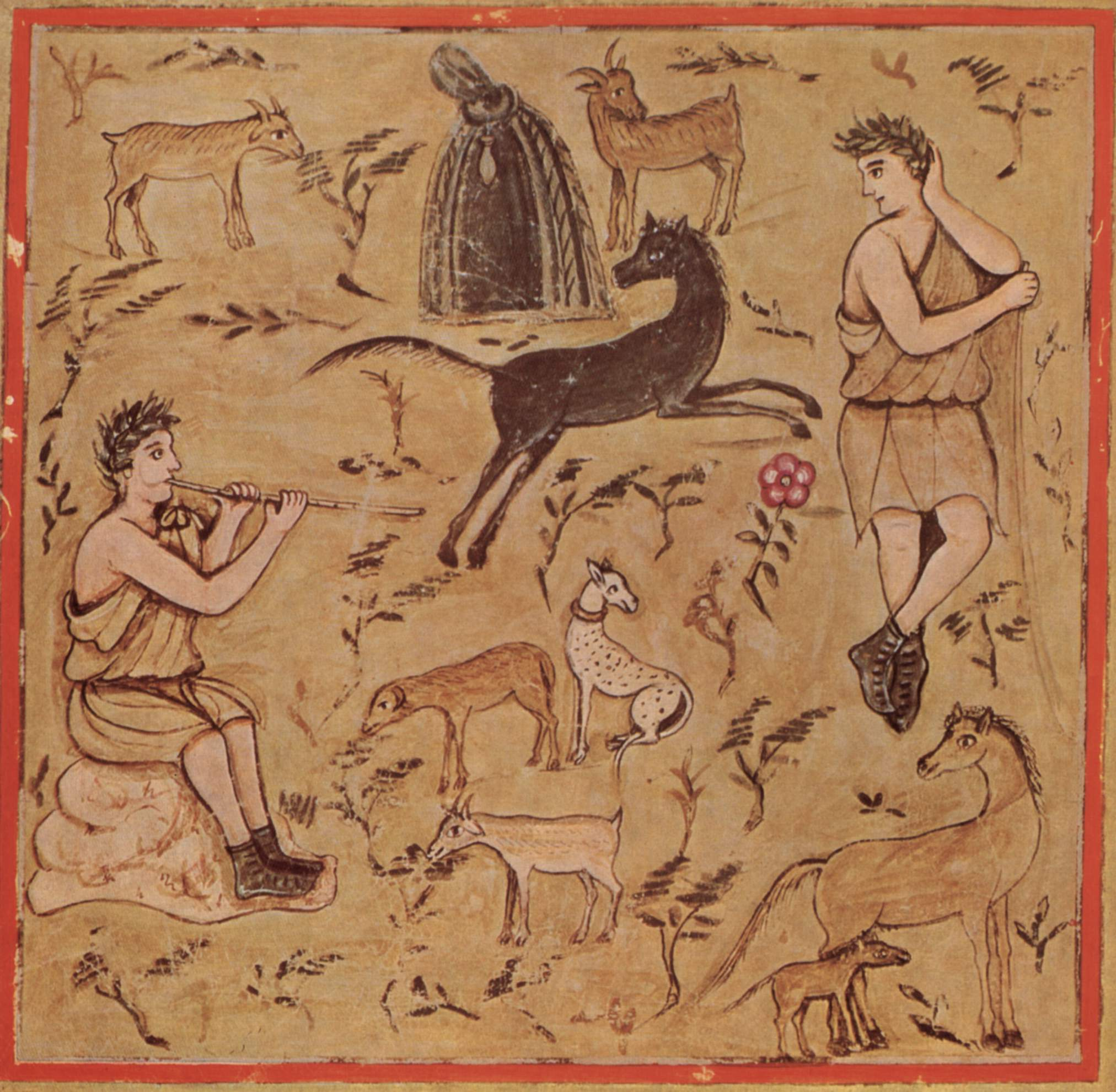
In Georgics, Virgil uses a hendiadys in the phrase "cups and gold" to mean "golden cups."

Hendiadys (/hɛnˈdaɪ.ədɪs/) is a figure of speech used for emphasis where a phrase and its qualifier is replaced by two phrases separated by the conjunction "and." For example, the phrase "by a long siege" may be converted to "by length of time and siege" (note how the adjective "long" becomes a noun: "length of time").

Hendiadys, in English, is also known as two for one and figure of twins. Although the underlying phrase is Greek (Ancient Greek: ἓν διὰ δυοῖν, romanized: hen dia duoin, lit. 'one through two'), the only other forms occasionally found in English are hendiaduo and hendiaduous, the latter of which the 17th-century English Biblical commentator Matthew Poole used in his commentary on Genesis 3:16, Proverbs 1:6, and Isaiah 19:20.

== Definition and types ==
A hendiadys involves the replacement of a subordinative relationship (e.g. adjective affecting a noun) with a coordinate relationship (e.g. noun "and" noun) in which one entity is expressed via separate items. In The Arte of English Poesie (1589), Puttenham provides the following example: "Fiercely fighting with horses and with barbes;" Puttenham explains the bolded phrase is an expansion of the phrase "barbd horses."

Tautologies and pleonasms (such as "cease and desist") are not considered hendiadyses; nor are merisms (such as "night and day").

There is a variety of types of hendiadys, including the following:

- Nominal: the adjective is translated into a noun and the conjunction "and" is added to combine it with the original noun; for example, "He came despite the rainy weather" becomes "He came despite the rain and the weather."
- Adjectival: the adverb becomes an adjective and coordinated with the original adjective; for example, "My tea was perfectly warm" becomes "My tea was perfect and warm."
- Verbal: a catenative verb and its infinitive are split by the conjunction; for example, "I am trying to argue my point" becomes "I try and argue my point."
- Antiptosis: though often not considered hendiadys, antiptosis involves the substitution of grammatical cases and is sometimes considered as a hendiadys; an example of an antiptosis is thus: "In the forests **at** night" becomes "In the forests **of** the night" (ablative to genitive). Peacham, however, defines hendiadys as solely this type.

Rarely, hendiadyses may combine two different parts of speech. An example of this is "the rough and tumble of politics."

Some linguistical definitions of a hendiadys place further restrictions, such as requiring a noun or subordination between the two elements.

Statements are often not definitively provable to be hendiadys. For example, Peter's statement in Acts 3:6— "Silver and gold have I none…—" could be interpreted as a hendiadys ("Silvery gold have I none") but is more likely referring to the individual metals. Additionally, as the word order in a hendiadys can be switched, the meaning is harder to determine. For example "cruel and unusual punishments;" could be read as a punishment that is (1) both cruel and unusual, (2) cruelly unusual, or (3) unusually cruel.

== Rhetorical use ==
Hendiadyses are often used to force the reader to focus on two separate aspects of a whole. For example, Ovid's line from the Metamorphoses, "with blood and fire his eyes sparkle" emphasizes two elements opposed to the non-hendiadic "bloody fire" or "fiery blood."

A hendiadys— especially in Latin poetry— may be used to assist rhythm and meter; an example of such is Ovid's hendiadys in Metamorphoses to maintain his dactylic hexameter: "commune est pignus onusque" (common is the pledge and burden).

Hendiadys is most effective in English when the adjectival and nominal forms of the word are identical.

The conjunction may be elided (parataxis): "This coffee is nice and hot" can become "This is nice hot coffee"; in both cases one is saying that the coffee is hot to a nice degree, not that the coffee itself would be nice even if cold.

When hendiadys fails in its effects, it can sound merely redundant. For example, the Latin grade cum amicitia atque pace, literally 'with friendship and peace', which initially contained hendiadys for emphasis, is often translated instead as "with peaceful friendship", which lacks hendiadys, and can therefore be interpreted to lack the same emphasis as the original phrase.

== Examples ==
- "Be a good fellow and close the door"
- "Come and get it" (from "come get it")
- "Nice and fat"
- "I will greatly multiply thy pain and thy conception…" — Genesis 3:16
- "Dieu et mon droit" (God and my right) — Coat of arms of the United Kingdom (hendiadys of "godly right")
- "We drink from cups and gold" — Virgil, Georgics
- "There was a snake sacred to Mars, remarkable for crests and gold" — Ovid, Metamorphoses
- "For I will give you a mouth and wisdom, which all your adversaries shall not be able to gainsay nor resist" — Luke 21:15
- "Angels and ministers of grace defend us!" — Shakespeare, Hamlet, act 1, scene 4
- "For who would bear the whips and scorns of time?" — Shakespeare, Hamlet, act 3, scene 1
- "Told by an idiot, full of sound and fury" — Shakespeare, Macbeth, act 5, scene 5

== In classical and Biblical literature ==
Hendiadys is often used in Latin poetry. There are many examples in Virgil's Aeneid, e.g., Book 1, line 54: vinclis et carcere, literally translated as "with chains and prison", but meaning "with prison chains".

In the Hebrew Bible, in Exodus 15:4, the Biblical Hebrew: מַרְכְּבֹת פַּרְעֹה וְחֵילוֹ, lit. 'chariots of Pharaoh and his army' means "the chariots of Pharaoh's army".

In Leviticus 25:47, the Hebrew says גֵּר וְתוֹשָׁב "alien and resident", but the phrase means a "resident alien".

In Lamentations 2:9, the Hebrew says אִבַּד וְשִׁבַּר "ruined and broken", but the phrase means "destroyed completely" or "smashed to bits".

In Isaiah 4:5, the phrase translated "cloud by day and smoke" is sometimes interpreted as a hendiadys meaning "a cloud of smoke by day".

In Mark 11:24, Koine Greek: ὅσα προσεύχεσθε καὶ αἰτεῖσθε, lit. 'whatever you pray and ask', means "whatever you ask in prayer".

The first identification of "hendiadys" under its modern verbiage was by Pomponius Porphyrion in the 2nd or 3rd century A.D. with his identification of the hendiadys in the Horace's Odes: "[laws] commanding to decorate at public expense towns and temples of the gods with fresh stone;" however this may be not be a hendiadys and in fact be two separate entities.

William Shakespeare uses hendiadys throughout his canon, most notably in Hamlet. When cautioning his sister Ophelia, Laertes makes use of this rhetorical trope repeatedly with "safety and health" (1.3.20), "voice and yielding" (1.3.22), and "morn and liquid dew" (1.3.41). Perhaps the most famous use of hendiadys in the play is Hamlet's own "Oh what a rogue and peasant slave am I" (2.2.538).

== As linguistic terminology in describing Turkic languages ==
Hendiadys is the preferred terminology used to describe some types of compounding in Turkic linguistics. Johanson, in his discussion of Turkic compounding, considers compounds of synonymous components to be hendiadys:

The asyndetic type noun + noun is also used in coordinative compounds, so-called twin words or binomes. In this case, two parallel nouns with similar meanings form a synonym compound, hendiadys, ... or a hyponym compound to express a higher concept ...

== See also ==
Hendiadys is different from these:

- Hendiatris, one through three does not have a subordination of parts
- Irreversible binomial, word pairs of collocation in which the order of the words cannot be reversed
- Litotes, a form of understatement for emphasis
- Merism, a figure of speech in which a whole is indicated by a brief enumeration of parts
- Legal doublets, which are the conjoining of two synonymous words
- Antiptosis
