= Anacoenosis =

Figure of speech

Anacoenosis /ˌænəsiːˈnoʊsɪs/ is a figure of speech in which the speaker poses a question to an audience in a way that demonstrates a common interest.

It can also be classified as a hyponym of rhetorical questions, where Anacoenosis notably invites the reader to cogitate on the subject at hand either through the formation of their own opinion or judgment.

== Etymology ==
The term comes from the Greek ἀνακοινοῦν (anakoinoûn), meaning "to communicate, impart".

== Discussion ==
Anacoenosis typically uses a rhetorical question, where no reply is really sought or required, thus softening what is really a statement or command.

Asking a question that implies one clear answer is to put others in a difficult position. If they disagree with you, then they risk conflict or derision. In particular if you state the question with certainty, then it makes disagreement seem rude.

Particularly when used in a group, this uses social conformance. If there is an implied agreement by all and one person openly disagrees, then they risk isolating themselves from the group, which is a very scary prospect.

If I am in an audience and the speaker uses anacoenosis and I do not agree yet do not speak up, then I may suffer cognitive dissonance between my thoughts and actions. As a result, I am likely to shift my thinking toward the speaker's views in order to reduce this tension.

== Examples ==
- Do you not think we can do this now?
- Now tell me, given the evidence before us, could you have decided any differently?
- What do you think? Are we a bit weary? Shall we stay here for a while?
- "And now, O inhabitants of Jerusalem, and men of Judah, judge, I pray you, betwixt me and my vineyard. What could I have done more to my vineyard, that I have not done in it?" Isaiah 5:3-4
- The entire speech of Marc Anthony in Shakespeare's Julius Caesar forms an extended example of anacoenosis. Marc Anthony begins by building common cause with the audience on stage, addressing them as "Friends, Romans, countrymen..." His speech then poses a number of rhetorical questions to them as part of his refutation of Brutus' words: "Did this in Caesar seem ambitious? / When that the poor have cried, Caesar hath wept: / Ambition should be made of sterner stuff: / Yet Brutus says he was ambitious;/ And Brutus is an honourable man. / You all did see that on the Lupercal / I thrice presented him a kingly crown, / Which he did thrice refuse: was this ambition?" (Act 3, Scene 2)

== See also ==
- Rhetorical question
