= Procatalepsis =

Figure of speech

Procatalepsis, also called prolepsis or prebuttal, is a figure of speech in which the speaker raises an objection to their own argument and then immediately answers it. By doing so, the speaker hopes to strengthen the argument by dealing with possible counterarguments before the audience can raise them.

In rhetoric, anticipating future responses and answering possible objections sets up one's argument for a strong defense. The Columbia Dictionary of Modern Literary and Cultural Criticism states that there are three distinct theoretical uses of prolepsis: argumentation, literary discussion, and conjunction with narratological analyses of the order of events.

In argumentation, procatalepsis is used to answer the opponent's possible objections before they can be made. In literary discussion, procatalepsis is used as a figure of speech in which a description is used before it is strictly applicable. Sayings such as "I'm a dead man" exemplify the suggestion of a state that has not yet occurred. In narratological analyses, prolepsis can be used with the order of events and presentation of events in texts. That refers to the study of narrative in respect to "flashforwards" in which a future event serves as an interruption of the present time of the text.

Example:

It is difficult to see how a pilot boat could be completely immune to capsizing or plunging, but pilot boat design criteria must meet the needs of the industry and pilotage authorities.

As a linguistic phenomenon found in both classic and current languages, prolepsis is described as the construction whereby the subject of a subordinate clause occurs by anticipation as an object in the main clause. Although that definition is strictly technical as used in linguistics, it has also been used to describe the more general phenomenon of objects or phrases appearing earlier than intended or expected.

== Other examples in rhetoric and argument ==
Procatalepsis as a rhetorical technique is also related to and used in other forms and techniques. A hypophora is described as a figure of speech in which a speaker raises a question then immediately answers it. Since these questions are often raised as possible dissenting opinions or audience objections, the hypophora can be said to be a use of procatalepsis.

The straw man argument, an informal fallacy in which one misrepresents an opposing argument in order to further one's own, can serve as an example of misused procatalepsis. In this fallacy, the rhetor misconstrues the words, arguments, or views of an opponent, most often on purpose, to facilitate rebuttal or create a false impression on the audience. This, in effect, creates a "straw man" against which the rhetor will then defend and strengthen his or her argument.

The correct use of procatalepsis is still an effective tactic in an argument, since it allows the rhetor to answer opponents before they have a chance to raise the counterargument themselves. This "inoculation" can be subtle, but also signaled rather obviously (e.g., "Now, my opponent might argue that X. But, as you can see, Y"). The unique benefit to this more overt approach is twofold: The rhetor successfully replies to an opposing argument or audience objection, but also builds a sort of trust and authority with the audience. Then, if the opponent does in fact bring up the argument that the rhetor anticipated, the rhetor appears to be correct not only in the subject matter of the argument but in the general course of the argument itself.

== Inoculation ==
Procatalepsis is linked to the rhetorical term inoculation. The Encyclopedia of Communication Theory describes this rhetorical technique in relation to its medical definition: introducing small doses of viruses to the body in order to build up immunization. In rhetoric, the small dose of the threat parallels to the awareness of the opposing argument that is used to build up one's argument by defense in prolepsis. William McGuire proposed the Inoculation Theory in 1964 to challenge attitudes, beliefs, and behaviors that make an argument more resistant when exposed to counter views in weakened, small doses. Persuasion research in the 1950s found that providing two sides of an issue created a greater resistance to later arguments. This is closely related to the rhetorical use of procatalepsis as an opposing argument to defend the intended view of the argument.

Inoculation and procatalepsis are both present in certain courtroom situations, as described in the Encyclopedia of Communication Theory. An attorney may set up their defense by disclaiming the negative views or classifications of the accused as untrue: "The prosecutor will call Ms. Jones evil, a bad mother, and a poor member of society, but these labels are not true. I will prove to you their inaccuracy." When the prosecutor asserts an attack on Ms. Jones' character, the jury is already prepared and expecting to hear it and they may question or even discount these accusations. The goal is not to overwhelm the audience members with anticipation or the opposing view of the argument, but rather to use the inverse argument to one's advantage through strategic rhetoric.

== See also ==
- Steelmanning
