= Antiptosis =

Type of rhetorical device

Antiptosis (from Ancient Greek ανταλλαγή (antallagḗ) 'exchange of' and περίπτωση (períptōsē) 'case') is a rhetorical device. Specifically, it is a type of enallage (the substitution of grammatically different but semantically equivalent constructions) in which one grammatical case is substituted for another.

In English, this technique is used only with pronouns. It is more effective with languages that use inflected nouns, such as Greek and Latin.

== Forms of Antiptosis ==
One form of the device is to replace the conjunction and with the preposition of, thus changing the case of the second noun from a case agreeing with the first noun to the genitive case.

This form of antiptosis is related to the technique hendiadys; it is more or less the opposite of it. It is also related to the technique hypallage, except that the governing noun becomes the adjective instead of the noun in regimen.

== Usage ==
The classic example of the use of antiptosis is:

the kingdom of glory

instead of

the kingdom and the glory

where the relation of kingdom and glory are altered by antiptosis.

In another example, one might say "That dress is you!" rather than "That dress is becoming to you," placing you in the nominative case rather than the expected objective case to emphasize the point being made.

Another prime example is "Me Jane, Tarzan," where "me" is used (the objective case pronoun) instead of the proper subjective case pronoun, "I". This example also includes ellipsis of the verb "am".

== See also ==
- Glossary of rhetorical terms
