= Catenative verb =

Verb that can precede another verb

In English and other languages, catenative verbs are verbs which can be followed within the same clause by another verb. This second subordinated verb can be in either the infinitive (both full and bare) or gerund forms. An example appears in the sentence He deserves to win the cup, where "deserve" is a catenative verb which can be followed directly by another verb, in this case a to-infinitive construction.

These verbs are called "catenative" because of their ability to form chains in catenative constructions. For example: We need to go to the tennis court to help Jim to get some practice before the game. "Need" is used here as a catenative verb followed by the infinitive "to go", and "help" is a catenative verb followed by the infinitive "to get".

Use of a catenative verb can be masked by hendiadys, in which the two parts are joined by an and, as in come and get it rather than come to get it.

== Form of the verb following the catenative verb ==
- Some catenative verbs are followed by a to-infinitive: "He agreed to work on Saturday"
- Some catenative verbs are followed by a gerund: "He admitted taking the money".
- Some catenative verbs are followed by either a to-infinitive or a gerund, either with or without a difference in meaning between the two structures:
  - No difference in meaning:
    - It began to rain.
    - It began raining.
  - Difference in meaning:
    - I forgot to go to the shopping centre. (I wanted to go to the shopping centre but then didn't go.)
    - I forgot going to the shopping centre. (I cannot remember the experience of going.)
- Some catenative verbs may be followed either by a bare infinitive or by a to-infinitive:
  - I helped pack her bags.
  - I helped to pack her bags.
  - Go clean your room. (This form is not standard in the UK, Australia or New Zealand.)
  - Go to clean your room.

== See also ==
- Auxiliary verb
- Chinese grammar § Serial verb constructions
- Compound verb
- Serial verb construction
