= Schesis onomaton =

Rhetorical technique

Schesis onomaton ("state of nouns", from Ancient Greek σχέσις [skhésis, "state, condition, attitude"] and ὀνομάτων [onomátōn, "of nouns"]), often misspelled scesis onomaton, was originally a rhetorical technique consisting of a sentence constructed only of nouns and adjectives. It later came to mean such a series of nouns and adjectives or any series of words that were synonymous expressions. In the second sense it is a rhetorical technique used to emphasize an idea by repeating it rapidly using slightly different words that have the same or a very similar meaning.

== Examples of first meaning ==
A man faithful in friendship, prudent in counsels, virtuous in conversation, gentle in communication, learned in all liberal sciences, eloquent in utterance, comely in gesture, an enemy to naughtiness, and a lover of all virtue and godliness.

— Peacham

== Examples of second meaning ==
Wendy lay there, motionless in a peaceful slumber, very still in the arms of sleep.

— Robert A. Harris, VirtualSalt

A Brief History of Time--Stephen Hawking.
