= Hypsos =

Greek concept similar to the sublime

Hypsos is a Greek philosophical concept comparable to the modern concept of the sublime, or a moment that brings oral speech to an astonishing and monumental pause. Its root hypso- literally means "aloft", "height", or "on high". However, a distinguishing feature of hypsos in rhetorical studies is that it “combines conflicting emotions: fear and awe, horror and fascinations.” It is a climactic moment in speech that generates uncertainty for the audience.

== Origin ==
The ancient Greek rhetoric teacher Longinus introduced the concept of hypsos in the only significant piece of literature that he is known for having written during his lifetime, On the Sublime. In his work, Longinus prompted the possibilities and freedom that speech could possess by presenting hypsos. Longinus’ theories and concepts differed greatly from other Greek rhetoricians and philosophers, and challenged the traditional rigid structure of rhetorical practices.

== Long-term effects ==
Hypsos is studied by present-day rhetoricians, and is often referred to through the publication of Translations of the Sublime: The Early Modern Reception and Dissemination of Longinus: Peri Hupsous in Rhetoric, the Visual Arts, Architecture, and the Theatre, a collection of volumes of Longinus’ essays. It stands as one of few pieces that explore the ways in which hypsos (which Longinus refers to as “the sublime in one single thought”) is used not only in rhetoric and literature, but also in the visual arts, architecture, and theater.
