= Paradeigma =

Greek term that refers to a pattern, example or sample

Paradeigma (Greek: παράδειγμα; plural: paradeigmata) is a technique used in Ancient Greek rhetoric used to compare the situation of the audience to a similar past event, like a parable (Greek: παραβολή). It offers counsel on how the audience should act. Aristotle was a prominent ancient rhetorician who explicitly discussed the use of paradeigmata.

In the Greek tradition many paradeigmata are mythological examples, often in reference to a popular legend or well-known character in a similar position to the audience. Homer's The Iliad (24.601–619) – Achilles is trying to encourage Priam to eat rather than continue to weep for his dead son Hector. He brings up Niobe, a woman that had lost twelve children but still found the strength to eat. He is trying to counsel Priam to do what he should by using Niobe as a paradeigma, an example to guide behaviour.

It is also the etymological root of the English word "paradigm".

== See also ==
- Exemplification theory
