= The lady doth protest too much, methinks =

Quote from Hamlet

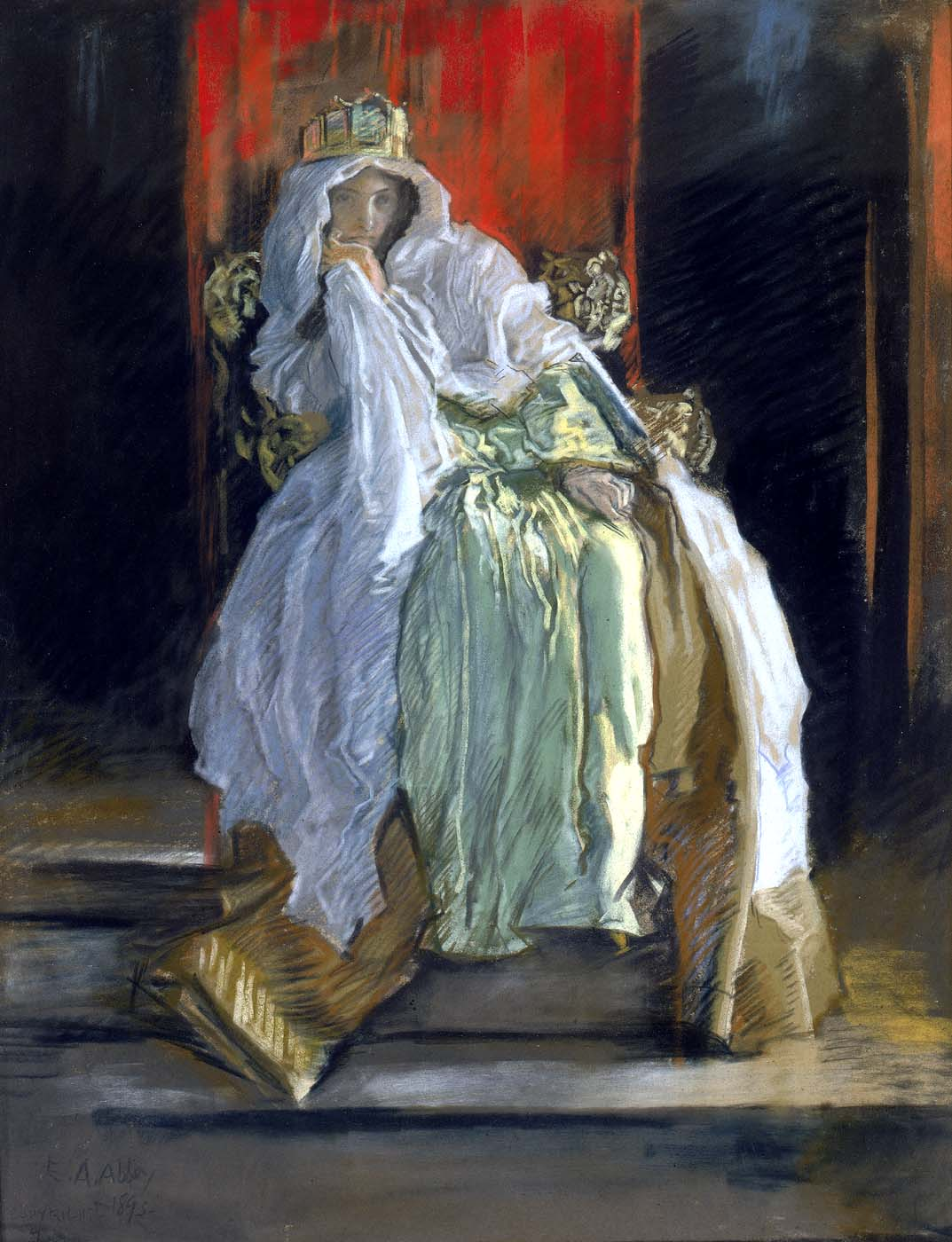
The Queen in "Hamlet" by Edwin Austin Abbey

"The lady doth protest too much, methinks" is a line from the play Hamlet by William Shakespeare. It is spoken by Queen Gertrude in response to the insincere overacting of a character in the play within a play created by Prince Hamlet to elicit evidence of his uncle's guilt in the murder of his father, the King of Denmark.

The expression is used in everyday speech to indicate doubt of someone's sincerity, in particular the suspicion that someone who denies something very strongly is hiding the truth. The line is often misquoted as "Methinks the lady doth protest too much."

== In Hamlet ==
The line is in iambic pentameter. It is found in Act III, Scene II of Hamlet, where it is spoken by Hamlet's mother Queen Gertrude. Hamlet believes that his father the king was murdered by his uncle Claudius, who then married Gertrude. Hamlet stages the play Murder of Gonzago which follows a similar sequence of events, to test whether viewing it will trigger a guilty conscience in Claudius.

Hamlet, Gertrude, Claudius, and others watch the play-within-the-play, in which the Player Queen declares in flowery language that she will never remarry if her husband dies. Hamlet then turns to his mother and asks her, "Madam, how like you this play?" She replies, "The lady doth protest too much, methinks", meaning that the Player Queen's declarations of love and fidelity are too excessive and insistent to be credible.

The quotation comes from the Second Quarto edition of the play, while the later First Folio uses the simpler line, "The Lady protests to much me thinkes." The first printed edition, the First Quarto, reads "The Lady protests too much."

== Everyday usage ==
The line's allusion to Gertrude's (lack of) fidelity to her husband has become a cliché of sexually fickle womanhood and a shorthand expression conveying doubt of a person's truthfulness, even when the subject is male. It is commonly used to suggest that someone who denies something very strongly must be hiding the truth; however, in the play, protest has the older meaning of 'vow' or 'declare' rather than 'deny'. The phrase is often shortened to "[X] protests too much". A common misquotation places methinks first, as "Methinks the lady doth protest too much."

== See also ==
- Reaction formation
