= Hypophora =

Figure of speech

Hypophora, also referred to as anthypophora or antipophora, is a figure of speech in which the speaker poses a question and then answers the question. Hypophora can consist of a single question answered in a single sentence, a single question answered in a paragraph or even a section, or a series of questions, each answered in subsequent paragraphs. Hypophora is used (1) as a transitional device, to take the discussion in a new direction, (2) a device to catch attention, since a reader's curiosity is stimulated by hearing a question, and (3) to suggest and answer questions the reader might not have thought of.

== History ==
The word anthypophora is present in Ancient Greek and is mentioned by the Roman orator Quintilian in his book Institutio Oratoria. In Institutio Oratoria, Quintilian merely identifies anthypophora as a device used to verify the truth of something, and does not mention raising a hypothetical question or objection. An earlier work by the Greek rhetorician Gorgias mentions anthypophora in its current definition, that is, presenting an opposing argument and then refuting it. The 16th-century English rhetorical handbook The Arte of English Poesie, reputedly by George Puttenham, gives the current definition of Anthypophora as well as numerous examples.

== Hypophora vs. anthypophora ==
In recent times, a division has arisen between the definitions of hypophora and anthypophora. The Century Dictionary identifies hypophora as the dissenting statement or question and anthypophora as the reply to the question. Thus, the two terms have come to embrace both elements of hypophora, as well as dealing with the whole concept.

== Effect ==
The rhetorical effectiveness lies in allowing the speaker to answer questions the listener may have. For instance, in Paul's Epistle to the Romans, Paul is explaining Jesus and he says "Is He the God of the Jews only? Is He not also of the Gentiles? Yes, of the Gentiles also" (Romans 3.29). In this manner, Paul confirms to the reader that God is god of both the Jews and Gentiles.

== See also ==
- Apophasis
- Figure of speech
- Rhetorical question
