= Rhetorical question =

Figure of speech

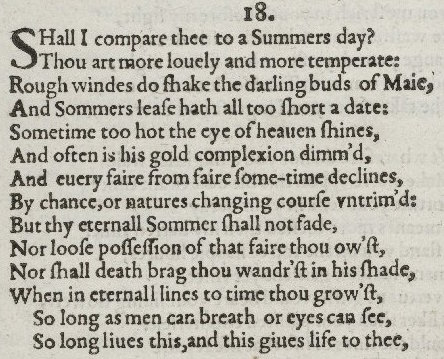
William Shakespeare's Sonnet 18 begins with a rhetorical question— an erotesis, to be precise: "Shall I compare thee to a summer's day?"

A rhetorical question is a rhetorical device where a question is asked for a purpose other than to obtain information. In many cases it may be intended to start a discourse, as a means of displaying or emphasizing the speaker's or author's opinion on a topic. A simple example is the question "Can't you do anything right?" This question is not intended to request a response about the listener's competence but rather to insinuate their lack of it. In many instances, rhetorical questions serve as a literary device with the purpose of persuading an audience or making them reflect on a topic.

== Types ==
=== Anacoenosis ===
Anacoenosis is sometimes classified as a hyponym of rhetorical questions; it refers to the asking for the opinion of the audience typically to imply a common interest. Some examples of anacoenosis are such:

- "And now, O inhabitants of Jerusalem, and men of Judah, judge, I pray you, betwixt me and my vineyard. What could I have done more to my vineyard, that I have not done in it?" — Isaiah 5:3–4
- "You all did see that on the Lupercal / I thrice presented him a kingly crown, / Which he did thrice refuse: was this ambition? / Yet Brutus says he was ambitious" — Mark Antony in Shakespeare, Julius Caesar, act 3, scene 2

=== Aporia ===
Aporia, also called addubitation, dubitatio, is a rhetorical device referring to the expression of doubt that is often (though not always) construed in the form of a rhetorical question. Aporia can be both feigned— where it is typically done to provide the opportunity to respond to the doubt expressed or prompt the reader to answer such rhetorical question (especially when there is an obvious answer)— or sincere— which is often used as a literary device to spur thought, conversation, character development, plot, etc. The following are examples of aporia as a rhetorical device:

- "I am at no loss for information about you and your family; but I am at a loss where to begin. Shall I relate how your father Tromes was a slave in the house of Elpias, who kept an elementary school near the Temple of Theseus, and how he wore shackles on his legs and a timber collar round his neck? Or how your mother practised daylight nuptials in an outhouse next door to Heros the bone-setter, and so brought you up to act in tableaux vivants and to excel in minor parts on the stage?" — Demosthenes, On The Crown
- "God for his mercy! what a tide of woes / Comes rushing on this woeful land at once! / I know not what to do ... If I know how or which way to order these affairs, / Thus disorderly thrust into my hands, / Never believe me" — York in Shakespeare, Richard II, act 2, scene 2 (this is an example of sincere aporia)
- "'But is there not a pleasure,' said Candide 'in criticizing everything, in pointing out faults where others see nothing but beauties?'" — Voltaire, Candide
- "That man over there says that women need to be helped into carriages, and lifted over ditches, and to have the best place everywhere. Nobody ever helps me into carriages, or over mud-puddles, or gives me any best place! And ain't I a woman? Look at me! [...] I have borne thirteen children, and seen most all sold off to slavery, and when I cried out with my mother's grief, none but Jesus heard me! And ain't I a woman?" — Sojourner Truth's "Ain't I A Woman" speech

=== Epiplexis ===
Epiplexes serve to challenge or criticize an idea. The question is often difficult or impossible to answer and functions as a negative assertion as the questioner does not desire an actual answer but attempts to shame or rebuke the respondent. Some examples of epiplexes are thus:

- "How could anyone believe that?"
- "Here was a Caesar! When comes such another?" — Mark Antony in Shakespeare, Julius Caesar, act 3, scene 2
- "What have the Romans ever done for us?" — Monty Python's Life of Brian (note the expression's equivalency to "the Romans have never done anything for us!")
- "Did you have a brain tumor for breakfast?" — Heathers

Rhetorical questions can be used as a metaphor for a question already asked. Examples may be found in the song "Maria" from the 1959 Rodgers and Hammerstein musical, The Sound of Music, in which "How do you solve a problem like Maria?" is repeatedly answered with other questions: "How do you catch a cloud and pin it down?", "How do you keep a wave upon the sand?" and "How do you hold a moonbeam in your hand?" These responses assert that a problem like Maria cannot be solved.

=== Erotesis ===
Eroteses are rhetorical questions which expect a fervent, unanimous answer: either strong affirmation or denial; however, the answer is not directly provided to the audience. Eroteses may be additionally referred to as erotema, interrogatio, or rogatio, though these terms may refer to the general hypernym of rhetorical questions. The use of erotesis can convey ardency and build towards a climax. Erotesis may be used as a segue into another topic via a proposition phrased as a question.The following are examples of erotesis:

- "How cute is that koala"
- "Shall I compare thee to a summer's day?" — Shakespeare, Sonnet 18
- "Was I not born in the realm? Were my parents born in any foreign country? Is not my kingdom here? Whom have I oppressed? Whom have I enriched to other's harm? What turmoil have I made in this commonwealth that I should be suspected to have no regard to the same?" — Queen Elizabeth I, response to a Parliamentary delegation discussing her marriage, 1566
- "Hath not / a Jew eyes? Hath not a Jew hands, organs, dimensions, / senses, affections, passions? ... If you prick us, do we not / bleed, if you tickle us, do we not laugh? If you / poison us, do we not die?" — Shylock in Shakespeare, The Merchant of Venice, act 3, scene 1
- "And did those feet in ancient time, / Walk upon Englands [sic] mountains green" — William Blake, eponymous poem
- "Another thing that disturbs me about the American church is that you have a white church and a Negro church. How can segregation exist in the true Body of Christ?" — Martin Luther King Jr., "Paul's Letter to American Christians," 1956

=== Hypophora ===
The hypophora, also sometimes called anthypophora (which sometimes refers to repeated use of hypophora), antiphora, subjectio, or apocrisis is a hyponym of a rhetorical question, characterized by the speaker posing a question which is immediately answered by the speaker. Some examples of hypophora are such:

- "Do you always watch for the longest day of the year and then miss it? I always watch for the longest day in the year and then miss it" — Daisy in The Great Gatsby (this can moreover be a manifestation of an epiphrase, as she had personally asserted her own opinion onto her question)
- "After all, what’s a life, anyway? We’re born, we live a little while, we die" — E.B. White, Charlotte's Web
- "Do you know the difference between education and experience? Education is when you read the fine print; experience is what you get when you don't" — Pete Seeger, Loose Talk, 1980

=== Pysma ===
Pysma, also known as quaesitio or subjectio, is the repeated successive asking of question that require diverse answers. Some examples of pysma are as follows:

- "Wherefore rejoice? What conquest brings he home? / What tributaries follow him to Rome, / To grace in captive bonds his chariot-wheels?" — Shakespeare, Julius Caesar, act 1, scene 1
- "In what place did he speak with them? With whom did he speak? How did he persuade them? Did he hire them? Whom did he hire? By whom did he hire them? To what end or how much did he give them?" — Cicero, Pro Roscio Amerino

=== Ratiocinatio ===
Ratiocinatio, a rhetorical device from Rhetorica Ad Herennium, is the process of reasoning via asking questions (typically reflexively), optionally including the subsequent answering of them. It is similar and sometimes deemed synonymous with hypophora. Ratiocinatio is most adept at working in the conversational style and builds the audience's anticipation towards the climax.

- "Old age is superior to youth. Why? The body has been tamed and the mind ripened with wisdom"
- "When our ancestors condemned a woman for one crime, they considered that by this single judgement she was convicted of many transgressions. How so? Judged unchaste, she was also deemed guilty of poisoning. Why? Because, having sold her body to the basest passion, she had to live in fear of many persons. Who are these? Her husband, her parents, and the others involved, as she sees, in the infamy of her dishonour. And what then? ..." — Rhetorica Ad Herennium, book IV, chapter XVI (this example dialogismus continues for about a page)
- "What's this, what's this? Is this her fault or mine? / The tempter or the tempted, who sins most?" Shakespeare, Measure for Measure, act 2, scene 2

=== Vernacular ===
In the vernacular, this form of rhetorical question is called "rhetorical affirmation". The certainty or obviousness of the answer to a question is expressed by asking another, often humorous, question for which the answer is equally obvious. Popular examples include "Do bears shit in the woods?", "Is the sky blue?" and "Is the Pope Catholic?"

A rhetorical question may be used in sarcastic contexts. For example, in response to being informed that smoking can increase the possibility of developing lung cancer, someone could respond with the question, "Who knew?" The question functions as an assertion that the truth of the statement should have been utterly obvious.

== Punctuation ==
Depending on the context, a rhetorical question may be punctuated by a question mark (?), full stop (.), or exclamation mark (!), but some sources argue that it is required to use a question mark for any question, rhetorical or not.

In the 1580s, English printer Henry Denham invented a "rhetorical question mark" (⸮) for use at the end of a rhetorical question; however, it was never in wide use and fell completely out of use in the 17th century. It was the reverse of an ordinary question mark, so that instead of the main opening pointing back into the sentence, it opened away from it.

== See also ==
- Hypothetical question
- Suggestive question
- Complex question
- Presupposition
- Double-barreled question
- Loaded question
- Implicature
- Performative contradiction
- Betteridge's law of headlines
