= Ioci =

Iocī (pronounced [ˈjɔkiː]) is a Latin word which can be translated as "humor". The most important use of iocī in terms of rhetoric was Cicero's use of it in De Oratore. It is not exactly a joke or humor used in a rhetorical way, but a blanket term for the various ways to use humor when making an argument.

== Ioci in De Oratore ==
In this work, Cicero defines two types of wit that can be used rhetorically. The first is humor, which can be used throughout an argument for favorable effect. The second is jesting, which is closer to joking in that it is less sustained. While jesting can be useful in some instances, it however is not always good. The two devices can be most effectively used as a rebuttal or critique of an argument.

== Ioci in rhetoric ==
Orators aiming to use some form of ioci in their argument should be aware that simply raising a joke is not enough to employ ioci well. The humor or jest should contribute to the argument the orator is trying to make in some way. A joke that has no purpose in an argument weighs it down and makes the orator less credible.

There are four overarching uses for humor in communicating a message. They are identification, clarification, enforcement, and differentiation:

- Identification: Humor can be used as an identifier for the speaker. This is because it builds support from the audience when the joke is funny. It also serves to establish credibility. Often the humor used with this aim in mind is self-deprecating.
- Clarification: Humor works to clarify complex topics or discussions because a good piece of humor will encapsulate the main point. It is also more memorable if it is funny. This is especially true in the media environment that rhetoricians exist in. If humor can be used to create a clip that will get a good amount of air time, all the better.
- Enforcement: Humor allows for the enforcement of norms or social behaviors that the communicator is trying to give to his audience. Humor is effect for this purpose because it levels criticism against the audience in a way that will not alienate them from the speaker.
- Differentiation: rhetors will often use humor to differentiate themselves from a particular group or idea. This is possibly the most used type of humor in a rhetorical context. Not only does it distinguish the speaker as apart from something they do not want to be associated with, but it also opens an avenue for criticism of that bad thing.

== Example of Ioci ==
One example of humor used in a rhetorical situation was Ronald Reagan's famous response to a question about his age in the 1984 presidential debates. Reagan responds "I will not make age an issue of this campaign. I am not going to exploit, for political purposes, my opponent's youth and inexperience." This was a very effective piece of humor because it functioned as both an identifier and differentiator. Reagan's line not only identified himself as an experienced politician, but also differentiated him from his opponent. At that point, the focus of the age debate was Walter Mondale. The question of Reagan’s age was not raised again, and he went on to win the 1984 election.
