= Grand style (rhetoric) =

The grand style (also referred to as 'high style') is a style of rhetoric, notable for its use of figurative language and for its ability to evoke emotion. The term was coined by Matthew Arnold. It is mostly used in longer speeches and can be used, as by Cicero, to influence an audience around a particular belief or ideology. The style is highly ornamented with stylistic devices such as metaphors and similes, as well as the use of personification. In poetry, it adopts strict adherence to metre.

== History ==
In ancient Greece, the 'grand style' of rhetoric was known as 'adros', and in Latin 'supra' or 'magniloquens'. It was made prominent by Roman authors such as Marcus Tullius Cicero. However, it was not confined to classical antiquity. As interest in the classics increased from the sixteenth century onwards in Britain its use gained acceptance. Poets such as William Shakespeare and John Milton both used the grand style. Augustine, notable for his On Christian Doctrine, expanded on Cicero's partition of the three styles by describing them as follows: the plain style is intended merely to be understood, the middle (or temperate) style is intended to be enjoyable to listen to and the grand style is intended to also be persuasive. The grand style incorporates all three, as it informs the audience of a concept, pleases through rhetorical devices and persuades via its eloquence.

== Features ==
A common feature of rhetoric in the grand style is the use of a repeated pattern, often emphasizing a word or phrase; this can be in the form of anaphora (Greek for 'carrying back') whereby the beginnings of a series of clauses are repeated:

In every cry of every man,
In every infant's cry of fear,
In every voice, in every ban,
The mind-forged manacles I hear:
—William Blake

The grand style may also feature epistrophe (Greek for 'return', also known as epiphoras or epiphora, 'to carry upon'), in which the end parts of clauses are emphasized:

Where affections bear rule, their reason is subdued, honesty is subdued, good will is subdued, and all things else that withstand evil for ever are subdued.

— Thomas Wilson

In poetry, the grand style may feature a rhyming couplet, whereby the last two lines of a section rhyme. This creates a sense of control by the narrator of the poem or speaker in the play. Formal, ornamented language is used, while slang and vulgarity are avoided. Verbs are often used in the imperative form, with the goal of swaying an audience. This form of speech has long been considered to be the peak of rhetorical skill, and many past pieces are still studied.

== Cicero ==
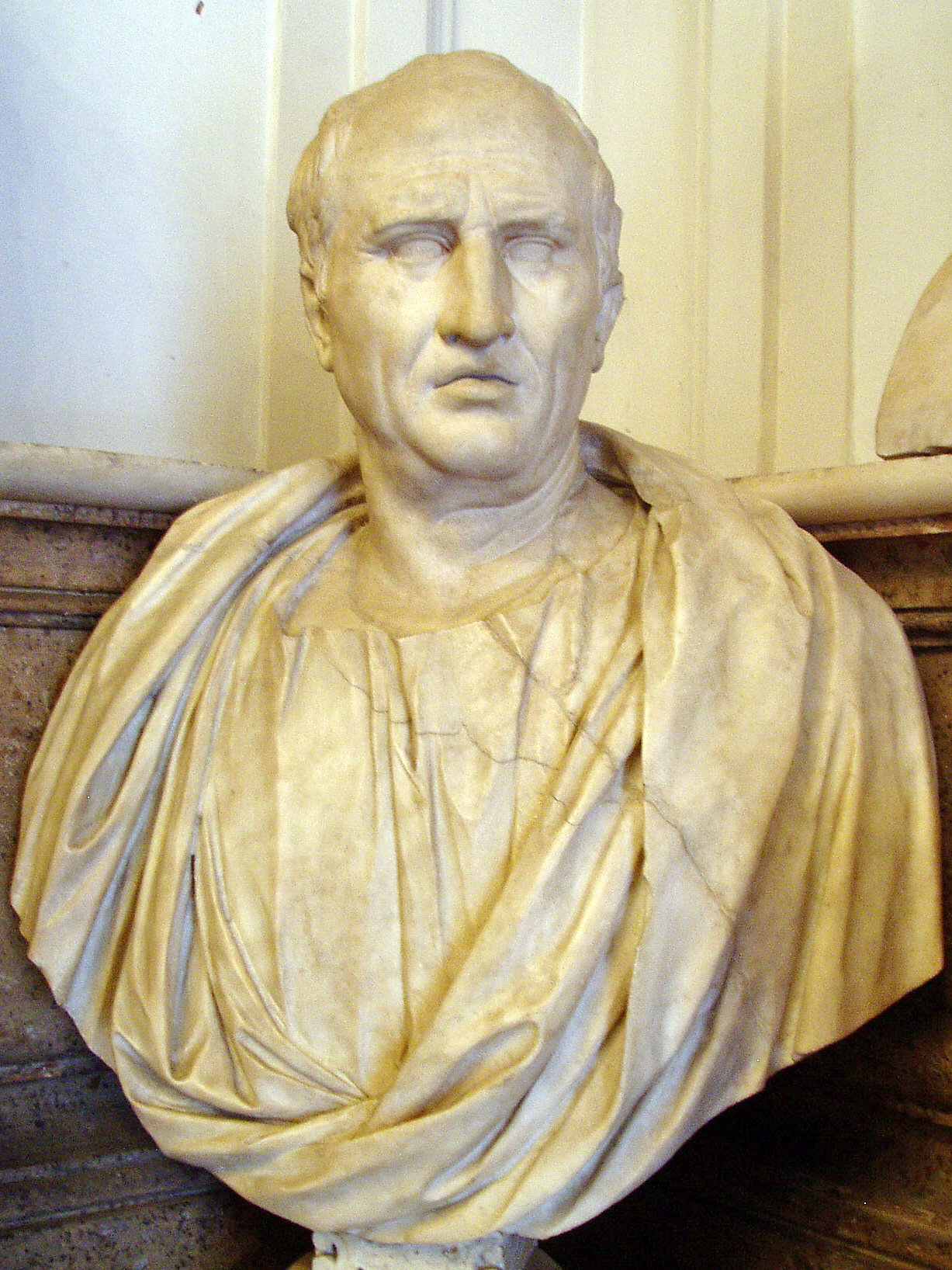
Bust of Cicero, Musei Capitolini, Rome

Cicero described the style's positive and negative effects. He commented on the eloquence and drive behind it, as well as the passion that it can convey to an audience. He noted how it held great emotional power over an audience and could be used to rally listeners to a cause.

However, he found danger in using the style. If the audience was not sufficiently prepared for a major speech, he claimed that it would appear as if the speaker were inebriated. He believed it necessary for a speaker to fully appreciate the two other styles—plain and middle—used respectively for 'teaching' and for 'pleasing'. He claimed that without the understanding all three, the potential of the grand style could never be realized.

== Matthew Arnold ==
Matthew Arnold, an English poet and cultural critic, described what he termed the grand style in a series of lectures he gave: On Translating Homer. He described the grand style as difficult to render, arguing this fact as evidence of the Iliad having been written entirely by Homer. He said that rather than by tangible features, the style could only be discerned spiritually. He linked the grand style, as used by Homer, to what he called the nobility of the verse. What Homer has done, according to Arnold, is to employ successfully the grand style in 'prosaic subjects'. Along with Homer, he cites Virgil, Dante, Milton, Sophocles and Pindar all as having used the grand style in their respective works.

He argued that there were only two forms of verse capable of achieving the grand style. The first, he said, was heroic couplet or blank verse (The former consists of pairs of rhymed lines, while the latter is unrhymed. Both comprise lines ten syllables long, typically in iambic pentameter.) The second form he stated was dactylic hexameter (the form employed by Homer and Virgil).

== See also ==
- Grand manner, a comparable concept in art.
