= Bdelygmia =

Rhetoric expressing hatred through criticism

Bdelygmia, deriving from a Greek word meaning "filth" or "nastiness", is a technique used in rhetoric to express hatred of a person, word or action through a series of criticisms. Bdelygmia often appears as an "abusive description of a character" or "by strong and inappropriate critique". It is synonymous with abominatio. It is believed that since common people do not belong to major decision-making groups, they cannot easily be swayed to feel a certain way. Violence in rhetoric, according to Lynette Hunter, arose because of this notion. It has become the dominant form of commentary on social media sites and is often described as "verbal violence" because of its hateful nature.

== Bdelygmia in classical rhetoric ==
Bdelygmia is consistent with an appeal to pathos. If an individual is trying to move their audience emotionally, he or she must express the same emotion toward a view or individual – in this case, hatred. Distinction is made between hatred and criticism. In comparison with other rhetorical devices, bdelygmia is not considered a very sophisticated appeal to emotion. As an appeal to pathos, effective bdelygmia employs strong language and knowledge of the intended. However, if gone about in the wrong way, employing bdelygmia in rhetoric can have severe repercussions, making the speaker seem intolerant and offensive. Rhetoric is used by politicians to instigate discourse between two opposing groups. Bdelygmia has a commonplace in political rhetoric because of the strong emotions evoked by the topics politicians often debate upon.

== Violence in rhetoric ==
According to Lynette Hunter, one of the reasons rhetoric emerged in Athens around 500 BC was as a way to manage physical violence: "[R]hetoric instigates violence; impels people into the cycle of brutality that once started becomes self-justifying."

== Examples in recent and contemporary culture ==
=== Online ===
One of the most prominent uses of bdelygmia in society today has been portrayed through cyberbullying. An individual who expresses hatred for another person or criticizes them in a negative way is using bdelygmia to bully them. Lynette Hunter implies that individuals who do not wish to resort to physical violence use a rhetorical device such as bdelygmia to try to attack someone through the delivery of words.

=== Politics ===
When people disagree with one another, they often try to associate their opposition with negative connotations. Lynette Hunter describes rhetorical violence in politics as a way to persuade people through the negative criticism of another rather than through physical force – when, for example, one party, through their criticisms and/or expressions of hatred or criticism, persuades a group to believe that the other party is treacherous.

The Republicans are not stupid. They tagged the liberals as "latte-drinking, Volvo-driving, school-busing, fetus-killing, tree-hugging, gun-fearing, morally relativist and secularly humanist so-called liberal elitists", as commentator Jason Epstein described it; soft on communism, soft on crime, opposed to capital punishment, and soft on the new war on terrorism...

— Mort Zuckerman, 6 June 2005

=== Literature and music ===
How the Grinch Stole Christmas! is an iconic piece of literature that uses the rhetorical device of bdelygmia to portray the main character, Mr. Grinch, as a terrible person. The lyrics not only allow the audience to understand that the Grinch is a bad person, but they use words such as "foul" and "nasty" [?to attribute with the Grinch].

"You're a foul one, Mr. Grinch, You're a nasty wasty skunk, Your heart is full of unwashed socks, your soul is full of gunk, Mr. Grinch. The three words that best describe you are as follows, and I quote, "Stink, stank, stunk!"

— quoted in

=== Popular culture ===
Another example of bdelygmia in popular culture is found in the movie "National Lampoon's Christmas Vacation". When Clark Griswold finds out he will not get his expected bonus, he goes on a rant stating, "I want to look him straight in the eye and I want to tell him what a cheap, lying, no-good, rotten, four-flushing, low-life, snake-licking, dirt-eating, inbred, overstuffed, ignorant, blood-sucking, dog-kissing, brainless, ****less, hopeless, heartless, fat-***, bug-eyed, stiff-legged, spotty-lipped, worm-headed sack of monkey **** he is. Hallelujah. Holy sh**. Where's the Tylenol?" By offering a long string of criticisms about his boss, Griswold appeals to the audience to also feel negatively towards him.
