= Enthymeme =

Type of rhetorical deductive argument

An enthymeme (Greek: ἐνθύμημα, enthýmēma) is an argument with a hidden premise. Enthymemes are usually developed from premises that accord with the audience's view of the world and what is taken to be common sense. However, where the general premise of a syllogism is supposed to be true, making the subsequent deduction necessary, the general premise of an enthymeme is merely probable, which leads only to a tentative conclusion. Originally theorized by Aristotle, there are four types of enthymeme, at least two of which are described in Aristotle's work.

Aristotle referred to the enthymeme as "the body of proof", "the strongest of rhetorical proofs...a kind of syllogism" (Rhetoric I, 1.3,11). He considered it to be one of two kinds of proof, the other of which was the paradeigma. Maxims, Aristotle thought, were a derivative of enthymemes. (Rhetoric II.XX.1). Aristotle discusses two types of enthymemes: demonstrative [deiktika] and refutative [elentika or rézoi (ῥέζοι)]. (Rhetoric II.XXII.14). Demonstrative enthymemes are of the fact that something is or is not the case; they draw a conclusion from what is agreed. Refutative enthymemes draw conclusions that are not agreed to by the opponent. (Rhetoric II.XXII.15). According to Aristotle, refutative enthymemes are better liked by audiences because the inconsistencies or opposing arguments are clearer when placed side by side. (Rhetoric II.XXIII.30). Enthymemes are derived from probabilities, or what happens for the most part, and signs, which sometimes point to a necessary conclusion and other times are refutable.

== Syllogism with an unstated premise ==
The first type of enthymeme is a truncated syllogism, or a syllogism with an unstated premise.

Here is an example of an enthymeme derived from a syllogism through truncation (shortening) of the syllogism:

- "Socrates is mortal because he's human."

The complete formal syllogism would be the classic:

All humans are mortal. (major premise – unstated)
Socrates is human. (minor premise – stated)
Therefore, Socrates is mortal. (conclusion – stated)

While syllogisms lay out all of their premises and conclusion explicitly, these kinds of enthymemes keep at least one of the premises or the conclusion unstated.

== Syllogism based on signs ==
In the Rhetoric, Aristotle argues that some enthymemes are derived from syllogisms that are based on signs (semeia) instead of absolute facts. In this context, signs are "things [that] are so closely related that the presence or absence of one indicates the presence or absence of the other." Examples are given below.

- "He is ill, since he has a cough."
- "Since she has a child, she has given birth."
- "He is yawning; therefore, he is sleepy."

In the examples, 'having a cough', 'having a child', and 'yawning' are signs of illness, giving birth, and sleepiness, respectively. In those cases, the enthymeme is only probably true because there are other sources of coughs besides pathogens, children besides parturition, and reasons for yawning besides sleepiness, such as allergies, adoption, and fatigue from exercising, respectively.

== Syllogism where the audience supplies a premise ==
The third kind of enthymeme consists of a syllogism with a missing premise that is supplied by the audience as an unstated assumption. In the words of rhetorician William Benoit, the missing premise is "assumed by rhetor when inventing and by audience when understanding the argument."

Some examples of this kind of enthymeme are as follows:

- "Candide is a typical French novel; therefore it is irreverent."
- "Many customers go to that coffee-shop; therefore, these customers enjoy coffee."

In the first case, the missing term of the syllogism is "French novels are irreverent" and might be an assumption held by an audience that would make sense of the enthymematic argument. In the second case, the missing term of the syllogism is "customers choosing this shop all enjoy coffee" and this might be another assumption held by audiences to make sense of that particular argument. Such unstated premises can also rise to the level of axioms (statements so commonly accepted as to be thought universally true) and logical fallacies.

== Visual enthymemes ==
Another kind of enthymeme is the visual enthymeme. Scholars have argued that words are not the only form of expression that can be understood to form enthymematic arguments. Pictures can also function as enthymemes because they require the audience to help construct their meaning. Modern-day internet memes are a good example of this, their meaning being inherited through the input and adaptations of the collective group of users who come across them, share them, and create them.

== Criticism ==
Some scholars argue that our understanding of the enthymeme has evolved over time and is no longer representative of the enthymeme as originally conceived by Aristotle. This is obviously true of the visual enthymeme, only conceived in the early twenty-first century and may also be true of the enthymeme as truncated syllogism. Carol Poster argues that this later interpretation of the enthymeme was invented by British rhetoricians such as Richard Whately in the eighteenth century.

== See also ==
- Chewbacca defense – Nonsensical diversionary legal defense
- Fallacy – Argument that uses faulty reasoning
- Modus ponens – Rule of logical inference
- Paradeigma – Greek term that refers to a pattern, example or sample
- Rogerian argument – Conflict-solving technique
- Senator, you're no Jack Kennedy – 1988 remark made by Lloyd Bentsen
