= Apophasis =

Stating something by saying the opposite

Apophasis (/əˈpɒfəsɪs/; from Ancient Greek ἀπόφασις (apóphasis), from ἀπόφημι (apóphemi) 'to say no') is a rhetorical device wherein the speaker or writer brings up a subject by either denying it, or denying that it should be brought up. Accordingly, it can be seen as a rhetorical relative of irony. A classic example of apophasis is "I'm not going to say that I told you so."

The device is also called paralipsis (παράλειψις) – also spelled paraleipsis or paralepsis – or occupatio or occultatio, and known also as praeteritio, preterition, or parasiopesis (παρασιώπησις).

== Usage ==
As a rhetorical device, apophasis can serve several purposes. For example, It can be employed to raise an ad hominem or otherwise controversial attack while disclaiming responsibility for it, as in, "I refuse to discuss the rumor that my opponent is a drunk." This can make it a favored tactic in politics.

Apophasis can be used passive-aggressively, as in, "I forgive you for your jealousy, so I won't even mention what a betrayal it was."

In Cicero's "Pro Caelio" speech, he says to a prosecutor, "Obliviscor iam iniurias tuas, Clodia, depono memoriam doloris mei" ("I now forget your wrongs, Clodia, I set aside the memory of my pain [that you caused].")

Apophasis can be used to discuss a taboo subject, as in, "We are all fully loyal to the emperor, so we wouldn't dare to claim that his new clothes are a transparent hoax."

As a rhetorical device, it can serve various purposes, often dependent on the relationship of the speaker to the addressee and the extent of their shared knowledge. Apophasis is rarely literal; instead, it conveys meaning through implications that may depend on this context. As an example of how meaning shifts, the English phrase "needless to say" invokes shared understanding, but its actual meaning depends on whether that understanding was really shared. The speaker is alleging that it is not necessary to say something because the addressee already knows it, but this may not be true. If it is, it may merely emphasize a pertinent fact. If the knowledge is weighted with history, it may be an indirect way of levying an accusation ("needless to say, because you are responsible"). If the addressee does not actually already possess the knowledge, it may be a way to condescend: the speaker suspected as much but wanted to call attention to the addressee's ignorance. Conversely, it could be a sincere and polite way to share necessary information that the addressee may or may not know without implying that the addressee is ignorant. For example, to highlight a spelling error, instead of pointing out the error one could simply use the word in passing, spelled correctly.

Apophasis can serve to politely avoid the suggestion of ignorance on the part of an audience, as found in the narrative style of Adso of Melk in Umberto Eco's The Name of the Rose, where the character fills in details of early fourteenth-century history for the reader by stating it is unnecessary to speak of them. Conversely, the same introduction can be made sarcastically to condescend to an audience and imply their ignorance.

Another diplomatic use would be to raise a criticism indirectly, as in, "It would be out of line for me to say that this action would be unwise and unaffordable, sir, as I only care about your best interests."

As the rhetorician Jennifer Mercieca has observed, apophasis can be used to deflect criticism. It can also be an effective device for spreading misinformation and conspiracy theories, because speakers can employ it to avoid taking responsibility for what they say.

== Examples ==
When apophasis is taken to its extreme, the speaker provides full details, stating or drawing attention to something in the very act of pretending to pass it over: "I will not stoop to mentioning the occasion last winter when our esteemed opponent was found asleep in an alleyway with an empty bottle of vodka still pressed to his lips."

United States president Donald Trump frequently employs apophasis. In 2015, Trump said of fellow Republican presidential candidate and former Hewlett-Packard CEO Carly Fiorina, "I promised I would not say that she ran Hewlett-Packard into the ground, that she laid off tens of thousands of people and she got viciously fired. I said I will not say it, so I will not say it." In 2016, he tweeted of journalist Megyn Kelly, "I refuse to call [her] a bimbo because that would not be politically correct."

== See also ==
- Antiphrasis
- Apophatic theology
- Argument from ignorance
- Argument from silence
- Elephant in the room
- Friends, Romans, countrymen, lend me your ears
- Glossary of rhetorical terms
- Ironic process theory
- Problem of induction
- Streisand effect
- The lady doth protest too much, methinks
- Unsaid

== Bibliography ==
- Smyth, Herbert Weir (1984) [1920]. Greek Grammar. Cambridge, MA: Harvard University Press. p. 680 (as paraleipsis). ISBN 0-674-36250-0.
- Lanham, Richard A. (1991) [1967]. A Handlist of Rhetorical Terms (Second Edition). University of California Press. p. 104 (as occultatio). ISBN 9780520273689
