= Auxesis (figure of speech) =

Figure of speech

Auxesis (Ancient Greek: αὔξησις, aúxēsis) is the Greek word for "growth" or "increase". In rhetoric, it refers to varying forms of increase:

- hyperbole (overstatement): intentionally overstating a point, its importance, or its significance
- climax (ascending series): a series of clauses of increasing force
- amplification (rhetorical increase): extension or exaggerated, needless repetition of arguments to emphasize the point

== See also ==
- Anticlimax, the opposite of auxesis in its climactic sense
- Catacosmesis, a form of anticlimax
- Figure of speech
- Banter
- Meiosis and litotes, the opposite of auxesis in its hyperbolic sense
- Rhetoric
- Trash-talk, insulting language usually found at sporting events
- Fighting words, language to create a verbal/physical confrontation by their use
- Flaming (Internet)
- Flyting, the exchanging of insults
- Hip hop music
- Profanity
- Sledging (cricket)
- Talking shit
- The dozens
- Wolf-whistling
