= Facilitas =

Facilitas is a facility in devising appropriate language to fit any speaking or writing situation.

== Quintilian Development ==
The art of facilitas was most notably taught by Quintilian, the Roman rhetorician, in the latter part of the first century A.D. (c. 35 – c. 100). In Quintilian's Institutio Oratoria, Quintilian summarizes the Roman educational system. In this system, students, generally young boys, were trained daily from the age of six to about eighteen. There were two levels of masters who taught the children: the grammaticus, who helped children with imitations, speaking and writing exercises, and the rhetor, who prepared students for the final stage of declamation, when they gave fictitious speeches. The ultimate goal of Quintilian's curriculum was for men to have facilitas: the ability to speak extemporaneously on any subject at any time. Quintilian taught the art of rhetoric, or effective communication, to his students in order for them to gain knowledge, as well as develop their analytical and political skills, in efforts to make them "good citizens."
