= Exemplification theory =

Metaphysical theory

Exemplification theory is a theory that states that an event is the exemplification of a property in an entity. This identity is often modeled as an "ordered triple" of an entity, property type, and time.

== Overview ==
Much of exemplification theory is based on logic arguing that there are evolutionary advantages that stem from the ability to group events together. Humans do this by sifting through experiences to group those that seem to go together and coding the occurrence of events in a quantitative manner that allows them to make judgments (most often nonconsciously) of how frequently different events occur. These judgments are considered based on two cognitive devices: the availability heuristic and the representativeness heuristic.

The availability heuristic tells us that judgments of social phenomena are greatly influenced by the ease with which information comes to mind. Availability heuristics can be a useful tool for assessing frequency or probability of an event. Individuals that employ the availability heuristic evaluate the frequency of events based on the quickness with which pertinent instances come to mind.

The representativeness heuristic is a special case of availability. It stipulates that abstract base-rate information plays little role in quantitative judgments about event populations. Instead, these judgments are based on the sample of more concrete exemplars that are available to the individual at the time of decision making. Exemplification theory is a simple combination of these heuristics. It posits that since exemplars come to mind more easily than base-rates when accessing information, available exemplars will dominate base-rate information when making judgments of event populations.

Behavioral intentions are the direct determinants of behaviors. Much of this research focuses on the manipulation of attitudes, subjective norms, and/or behavioral control with the message having a direct impact on receivers based on the information provided and the presentation of base-rates and exemplars. Exemplification theory examines the role of base-rates and exemplars in communication messages. Individuals pay attention to (and are more influenced by) exemplars than by base-rate data. Base-rates are not always inconsequential.

Criticism in the 1980s rejected exemplificationism, charging that it ultimately conflates events with facts. Since then, exemplificationism has lost almost all of its previous popularity.

== Exemplars and base-rates ==
An exemplar is an instance of an event population that shares essential features with all other instances from the group of events that is defined by those features. In a sense, exemplars are case reports used to represent characteristics typical of a group of event. Commonly, exemplars are illustrative representations of information. An exemplar will provide a demonstration of an event.

Exemplars used in conjunction with base-rates as case illustrations of event populations to enhance or detract from given base-rate information as the salient features of the exemplar are representative of the event population. As with news reports, exemplars are often added to provide a description of an event being discussed within a report and are chosen for their entertaining qualities.

Base-rates present descriptions limited to certain general features of the event population. Base-rate information often comes in the form of a numerical representation such as the frequency with which an event occurs. Typically it is thought of as quantitative information about population events or a general description of the number of things or people in the setting.

Base-rates are said to be less illustrative or vivid than exemplar information. They have not been examined as often as exemplars. They are overwhelmed by exemplars in many circumstances, it does not appear that they are always ignored. Prior investigations suggest that base-rates are perceived by decision makers as more reliable and can influence decisional confidence more than exemplars. Base-rates are perceived as more truthful, precise, and accurate than exemplars. Nevertheless, recent research has shown that exemplification effects are prone to other perceptual phenomena.

Some research suggests several disadvantages to the use of exemplars, particularly in relation to perceptual bias that might result from their use. Exemplars are also said to play a role in perpetuating negative stereotypes, and in isolation are frequently found to be inefficient sources of information.

Exemplar information has largely been found to be less reliable than base-rate information. In part, because it is seldom collected or presented in a systematic manner.

Exemplification research demonstrates that individuals often base their assessment of social reality more strongly on attributes of the exemplars selected for inclusion in media reports than statistical representations of information. This has been found problematic when the exemplar is atypical and chosen for its entertaining or sensational qualities, a common occurrence within news stories.
