= Example =

Example may refer to:

- Exempli gratia (e.g.), usually read out in English as "for example"
- .example, reserved as a domain name that may not be installed as a top-level domain of the Internet
  - example.com, example.net, example.org, and example.edu: second-level domain names reserved for use in documentation as examples
- HMS Example (P165), an Archer-class patrol and training vessel of the Royal Navy

== Arts ==
- The Example, a 1634 play by James Shirley
- The Example (comics), a 2009 graphic novel by Tom Taylor and Colin Wilson
- Example (musician), the British dance musician Elliot John Gleave (born 1982)
- Example (album), a 1995 album by American rock band For Squirrels

== See also ==
- Exemplar (disambiguation), a prototype or model which others can use to understand a topic better
- Exemplum, medieval collections of short stories to be told in sermons
- Eixample, a district of Barcelona with distinctive architecture
