= Hypallage =

Figure of speech

Hypallage (/haɪˈpælədʒiː/; from the Greek: ὑπαλλαγή, hypallagḗ, "interchange, exchange") is a figure of speech in which the syntactic relationship between two terms is interchanged, or – more frequently – a modifier is syntactically linked to an item other than the one that it modifies semantically. The latter type of hypallage, typically resulting in the implied personification of an inanimate or abstract noun, is also called a transferred epithet.

== Examples ==
- "On the idle hill of summer/Sleepy with the flow of streams/Far I hear..." (A. E. Housman, A Shropshire Lad) — "Idle", although syntactically modifying "hill", semantically describes the narrator, not the hill.
- "Restless night" — The night was not restless, but the person who was awake through it was.
- "Happy morning" — Mornings have no feelings, but the people who awaken to them do.
- "Beside the clock's loneliness" - The clock is not lonely, but the poet is; from Ted Hughes' "The Thought Fox".
- "While he's waiting, Richard pops a nervous handful of salted nuts into his mouth." (A. M. Homes, This Book Will Save Your Life)
- "Flying over the sleeping countryside" — The countryside is not sleeping, the people living there are.
- "Corruption reaps the young ..." (Theodore Roethke, first line of "Feud," in Open House (1941). Subject and object are interchanged: corruption does not reap the young, the young reap corruption (because of the feud).
- "He nodded his agreeing head".

== In other languages ==
Hypallage may be seen in Ancient Hebrew writings. Examples may include Book of Job 21:6, where "my flesh seizes trembling" seems to mean "trembling seizes my flesh" and Psalms 116:15, where "precious in the eyes of the LORD is death, as to his faithful ones" seems to mean "the life of his faithful ones is precious in the eyes of the LORD," so he does not lightly let them die.

Hypallage is often used strikingly in Ancient Greek and Latin poetry. Examples of transferred epithets are "the winged sound of whirling" (δίνης πτερωτὸς φθόγγος), meaning "the sound of whirling wings" (Aristophanes, Birds 1198), and Horace's "angry crowns of kings" (iratos...regum apices, Odes 3.21.19f.). Virgil was given to hypallage beyond the transferred epithet, as "give the winds to the fleets" (dare classibus Austros, Aeneid 3.61), meaning "give the fleets to the winds."

Literary critic Gérard Genette argued that the frequent use of hypallage is characteristic of Marcel Proust's style.

== See also ==
- Antiptosis
- Pathetic fallacy
- Psychological projection
