= Literary device =

Purposeful use of language

A literary device, literary technique, figure of speech, rhetorical device, stylistic device, or trope is any strategy of using language that a writer or speaker employs to deliberately achieve some purpose. This purpose is typically: to focus or guide the audience's attention, to make the language or its content memorable, or to evoke a particular emotional, rational, aesthetic, or other response. The many names (or synonyms) for this concept may carry slightly distinct meanings in technical scholarly usage.

Literary devices are classifiable into various sub-categories, such as narrative devices, poetic devices, argumentative devices, linguistic schemes or templates, or other techniques distinct to certain forms of language. They can be difficult to cleanly classify, however, as many are common across multiple such forms and can intersect under various categories, such as figurative (non-literal) devices.

== Terminology ==
In literature, a device is a common term for any intentional strategy of language use.

The word trope originally meant an artistic effect realized with figurative (i.e. non-literal) language, or "a substitution of a word or phrase by a less literal word or phrase". Semantic change has expanded the definition of trope to also describe a writer's usage of commonly recurring or overused devices (including types of characters and situations), motifs, and clichés in a work of creative literature. Trope entered English from Latin tropus, 'figure of speech', itself derived from the Koine Greek τρόπος (tropos), 'a turn, a change'.

The term figure of speech, or simply figure (sometimes rhetorical figure) in this context, has two related meanings. The broader and more technical meaning is merely a synonym for any literary device. In scholarship, that often explicitly includes the two sub-types tropes (as defined narrowly above) and schemes. Tropes, again, are deviations of words from their ordinary or literal usage, while schemes are variations in the sequence, or the usual expected order, of words. Scheme comes from the Greek schēma, 'form or shape'. However, colloquially, a figure of speech tends to specifically mean a trope. In the distinction between literal and figurative language, figures of speech or tropes in this sense constitute the latter.

Likewise, rhetorical device can be a simple synonym for literary device, though more narrowly it refers to a technique specifically of persuasive or argumentative language usage (rhetoric). These rhetorical devices aim to make a position or argument more compelling, emotionally or otherwise, or to prompt the audience to take action.

== History ==
During the Renaissance, scholars meticulously enumerated and classified literary devices. The term figure of speech dates back to the Renaissance humanists, who initially used it in its broad technical meaning, themselves inspired by reading the classical rhetoricians. Henry Peacham, for example, in his The Garden of Eloquence (1577), enumerated 184 different figures of speech. Professor Robert DiYanni, in his book Literature: Reading Fiction, Poetry, Drama and the Essay wrote: "Rhetoricians have catalogued more than 250 different figures of speech, expressions or ways of using words in a nonliteral sense".

== Narrative devices ==
Various literary devices are specifically applied to enhance narratives and storytelling. Some examples include:

- Allegory: the crafting of a story with a second implicit meaning, usually by endowing its characters, setting, and events with symbolic significance. Such a story thus functions symbolically in its entirety; often, each literal item corresponds to an abstract idea or principle. For instance, Animal Farm by George Orwell is an allegory for the Russian Revolution, using non-human animal characters as stand-ins for real historical people and plot points that mirror historical events.
- Flashback: a scene or plot that occurs before the events of the current narrative timeline. It is used to explain plot elements, give background and context to a scene, or develop characteristics of the characters or events. In some cases, the majority of a narrative can be expressed through a flashback.
- Foreshadowing: the inclusion of clues about what is to come next in a story, which builds tension and the audience's suspense.
- Mood and tone: The mood is a narrative's emotional atmosphere, the general feelings the audience is intended to experience, while the tone is the writer's or speaker's attitude toward the subject, the reader, or herself or himself.
- Motif: any word, phrase, image, or idea that is repeated throughout a work, sometimes using a variety of related but distinct phrasings. The purposes of motifs are diverse (to develop a theme, to establish a mood, to act as symbolism, etc.) and they often intersect with other narrative techniques.
- Plot device: any technique used to help move a story's plot forward.
- Story within a story: a particular narrative that is presented by characters inside the context of a second narrative. If an entire story is largely framed within another, this is a frame story. For example, Mary Shelley's Frankenstein uses the adventures of a sea captain as a frame story for the famous tale told of the scientist and his creation.

== Poetic and sound-based devices ==
Sonic language, the communication of content more complexly, quickly, or artistically through a reliance on sound or through evoking sounds in the imagination, is often a defining feature of poetry. It delivers messages to the audience by prompting specific reactions through auditory perception. Here are some examples:

- Alliteration: the repetition of the sound of an initial consonant or consonant cluster (potentially, also initial vowels) across multiple words or syllables. (Example: "Small showers last long but sudden storms are short." from Shakespeare's Richard II 2.1.)
- Assonance: the repetition of similar vowel sounds inside of neighbouring words. (Example: "Flow slowly, you rosy glowing ocean!" repeats the "oh" vowel sound multiple times.)
- Consonance: the repetition of consonant sounds across words. It is different from alliteration as it can happen at any place in the word, not just the beginning. (In the following example, the k sound is repeated four times: "with streaks of light,/ And flecked darkness like a drunkard reels" in Shakespeare's Romeo and Juliet 2.3.)
- Cacophony and euphony: the use of a series of phonemes regarded as either pleasant or unpleasant (respectively). Cacophony is the use of perceptually less pleasant, more strident, or subjectively harsher linguistic sounds, such as the Plosive consonants k, g, t, d, p and b, the hissing sounds sh and s, and also the affricates ch and j, in rapid succession in a line or passage, creating a harsh and discordant effect. (Example: "Hear the loud alarum bells/ Brazen bells! What tale of terror, now, their turbulency tells!/ In the startled ear of night/ How they scream out their affright!/ Too much horrified to speak,/ They can only shriek, shriek..." from Edgar Allan Poe's "The Bells".) Euphony, on the other hand, is the use of linguistic sounds that are considered pleasant, warm, musical, beautiful, etc.
- Metre and rhythm: words and phrases organized with an intentional pattern of strong and weak phonetic elements (such as stressed and unstressed syllables) in a particular order, to create a certain musical effect when read or spoken aloud
- Onomatopoeia: wording that attempts to emulate a sound. When used colloquially, it is often accompanied by multiple exclamation marks or written in all caps. Beyond narrative writing, it is common in comic strips and some cartoons. (Some examples: smek, thwap, kaboom, ding-dong, plop, bang and pew.)
- Rhyming: the repetition of identical or similar sounds at the ends of words, and often at the ends of each line of a poem. The effect is to make words or lines more memorable, catchy, or musical.

== Rhetorical and argumentative devices ==
Rhetoric is the art of persuasion; so, strictly speaking, rhetorical devices or figures are language techniques employed in order to persuade people. Traditionally, three broad classifications of rhetorical devices by what they appeal to, including: emotions, logic, or the presenter's own credibility as a person, i.e. pathos, logos, and ethos, respectively. In the following list, rhetorical device is used narrowly to mean any such device at the phrase- or sentence-level, which according to literary critic M. H. Abrams, departs from ordinary or literal language "mainly by the arrangement of their words to achieve special effects, and not [or not merely], like metaphors and other tropes, by a radical change in the meaning of the words themselves". Often they relate to how new arguments are introduced into the text or how arguments are emphasized.

- Amplification/Pleonasm: Amplification involves repeating a word or expression while adding more detail, to emphasise what might otherwise be passed over. This allows one to call attention to and expand a point to ensure the reader realizes its importance or centrality in the discussion. (Example: "But this revolting boy, of course,/ Was so unutterably vile,/ So greedy, foul, and infantile/ He left a most disgusting taste/ Inside our mouths..." in Roald Dahl's Charlie and the Chocolate Factory.) Pleonasm involves using more words than necessary to describe an idea. This creates emphasis and can introduce additional elements of meaning. Example: "Swerve not from the smallest article of it, neither in time, matter or other circumstance" in Shakespeare's Measure for Measure 4.2.
- Antanagoge: the "placing [of] a good point or benefit next to a fault criticism, or problem in order to reduce the impact or significance of the negative point". Example: "Within the infant rind of this weak flower/ Poison hath residence, and medicine power" in Shakespeare's Romeo and Juliet 2.3. One scenario involves a situation when one is unable to respond to a negative point and chooses instead to introduce another point to reduce the accusation's significance. Example: "We may be managing the situation poorly, but so did you at first". Antanagoge can also be used to positively interpret a negative situation: "When life gives you lemons, make lemonade".
- Apophasis: the bringing up a subject by denying that it should be brought up. It is also known as paralipsis, occupatio, praeteritio, preterition, or parasiopesis. (Example: "There's something tells me, but it is not love,/ I would not lose you; and you know yourself,/ Hate counsels not in such a quality" in Shakespeare's The Merchant of Venice 3.2.)
- Aporia: a rhetorical expression of doubt. (Example: "To be or not to be, that is the question" in Shakespeare's Hamlet 3.1.) When the rhetorical question posed is answered, this is also an instance of hypophora.
- Diasyrmus: rejecting an argument through ridiculous comparison.
- Enthymeme: a syllogism (an argument with premises leading to a conclusion) which omits either one of the premises or the conclusion. The omitted part must be clearly understood by the reader. Sometimes this depends on contextual knowledge. (Example: "They say it takes hundreds of years to build a nation. Welcome to Singapore" of the Singapore Tourism Board campaign.)
- Gish gallop: an attempt in a debate to overwhelm an opponent by presenting an excessive number of arguments, without regard for their accuracy or strength, with a rapidity that makes it impossible for the opponent to address them in the time available. Gish galloping prioritizes the quantity of the galloper's arguments at the expense of their quality. The term "Gish gallop" was coined in 1994 by the anthropologist Eugenie Scott who named it after the American creationist Duane Gish, dubbed the technique's "most avid practitioner".
- Hypophora: the asking of a question and immediately proceeding to answer it. (Example: "Can honour set to a leg? No. Or an arm? No. Or take away the grief of a wound? No. Honour hath no skill in surgery, then? No. What is honour? A word. What is in that word honour? What is that honour? Air. A trim reckoning! Who hath it? He that died a' Wednesday. Doth he feel it? No. Doth he hear it? No. 'Tis insensible, then? Yea, to the dead. But will it not live with the living? No. Why? Detraction will not suffer it" in Shakespeare's Henry IV, Part 1 5.1.)
- Innuendo: the indirect implying of an accusation without explicitly stating it. This can be combined with apophasis. (Example: "I notice all the bottles in your liquor cabinet are empty." This implies this listener/reader has drunk all the liquor.)
- Metanoia: recalling or rejecting a statement and then re-expressing it in a better or stronger way. A negative is often used to do the recalling. (Example: "All faults that may be named, nay, that hell knows..." in Shakespeare's Cymbeline 2.4; i.e. "All faults that a person can name or, no, even more than that: all the faults in hell itself....")
- Procatalepsis: the anticipating and answering of a possible objection in advance, allowing an argument to continue while rebutting points opposing it. It is a relative of hypophora. (Example: "'All right!' you'll cry. 'All right!' you'll say,/ 'But if we take the set away,/ What shall we do to entertain/ Our darling children? Please explain!'/ We'll answer this by asking you,/ 'What used the darling ones to do?/ How used they keep themselves contented/ Before this monster was invented?'" in Roald Dahl's Charlie and the Chocolate Factory.)
- Rhetorical question: the raising of a question to persuade the audience or make them reflect, while not actually expecting an answer.

=== Four rhetorical operations ===
Classical rhetoricians classified four categories or quadripita ratio:

- addition (adiectio), also called repetition/expansion/superabundance
- omission (detractio), also called subtraction/abridgement/lack
- transposition (transmutatio), also called transferring
- permutation (immutatio), also called switching/interchange/substitution/transmutation

These categories are often still used. The earliest known text listing them, though not explicitly as a system, is the Rhetorica ad Herennium, of unknown authorship, where they are called πλεονασμός (pleonasmos—addition), ἔνδεια (endeia—omission), μετάθεσις (metathesis—transposition) and ἐναλλαγή (enallage—permutation). Quintillian then mentioned them in Institutio Oratoria. Philo of Alexandria also listed them as addition (πρόσθεσις—prosthesis), subtraction (ἀφαίρεσις—afairesis), transposition (μετάθεσις—metathesis), and transmutation (ἀλλοίωσις—alloiosis).

== Figurative language ==
An instance of figurative language (equated with a figure of speech or trope in their narrower meanings) is any way of wording something other than the ordinary literal way, often to provide the audience some heightened feeling, to evoke a more complex meaning, or to form an unintuitive or deeper connection in the audience's mind. American literary theorist Kenneth Burke has called metaphor, metonymy, synecdoche and irony the "four master tropes", due to their frequency in everyday discourse. However, many examples of figurative language exist, including:

- Allusion: the use of a word or phrase as a reference (implicitly) to something culturally, historically, or literarily well-known. To call Beirut the "Paris of the Middle East" is an allusion to Paris in the sense of a metropolitan hub of culture, business, finance, and the arts.
- Antanaclasis: a form of pun or wordplay in which a word is repeated in two different senses.
- Anthimeria: the transformation of a word of a certain word class to another word class: such as a noun for a verb and vice versa. "Don't yes, sir me!" is an example.
- Apostrophizing: a character or speaker directly addressing someone absent or dead, or an inanimate or abstract object, as if it were a person.
- Hyperbole: deliberate exaggeration, used for dramatic or persuasive effect. (Example: "The brightness of her cheek would shame those stars,/ As daylight doth a lamp; her eyes in heaven/ Would through the airy region stream so bright/ That birds would sing and think it were not night" from Shakespeare's Romeo and Juliet 2.2.)
- Imagery: the use of vivid details (typically involving other figures of speech) to invoke any, and usually multiple, of the five senses. It causes the audience to visualize or imagine something, thus "painting a picture" with words. (Rarely also known as enargia, meaning "Vivid, forceful descriptions creating strong visual images related to audience experience".)
- Metonymy and synecdoche: referring to a person, group, or concept by a related object or a related part or feature. Often it is used to represent the whole of an abstract idea with a brief word or phrase. (Example: The word 'crown' may be used metonymically to refer to the king or queen, and at times to the entire law of the land in a monarchic nation.) A common sub-type of metonymy is synecdoche, which uses specifically a smaller part of something to refer to the larger whole. Many examples of synecdoche are typical idioms. Workers on a farm, for instance, are sometimes called "hands" or "farm hands" because of their association with manual labor.
- Personification: a description of inanimate objects or non-animal organisms using human-like or animal-like traits. (Example: "The moon smiled down on the travellers" suggests the pleasant warmth of the moonlight and perhaps fortunate prospects for the characters. However, literally speaking, the moon does not smile; humans do.)
- Symbolism: the use of a physical object, person, situation, action, word, color, or gesture to represent an abstract meaning or idea. In the phrase "All their fears melted in the face of the newly risen sun", the sun may literally exist in the scene, but it carries a second meaning too: suggesting newfound hope or courage.
- Understatement, or meiosis: presenting a diminished view of the importance, significance, or magnitude of a subject, for humor, propriety, cautiousness, or other reasons. An example is "The war situation has developed not necessarily to Japan's advantage" in the Hirohito surrender broadcast. A subtype of understatement is litotes, which uses negation, as in "Heatwaves are not rare in the summer."
- Types of literary analogy: a comparison by showing how two seemingly different entities are alike, along with illustrating a larger point due to their commonalities.
  - Metaphor: a comparison between something and something else that are not typically connected, without explicitly or self-awarely noting the comparison (thus linguistically leaving the comparison implied or assumed). It is frequently invoked simply by a form of the verb "to be" (is, are, was, am, etc.). The literary critic and rhetorician, I. A. Richards, divides a metaphor into two parts: the vehicle (the literal object being related) and the tenor (the deeper implied meaning). "That boy is a machine!" is a metaphor that emphatically portrays a young man as hard-working, determined, industrious, aggressive, etc. while not literally meaning that the boy is a mechanical object. "The football players were marching soldiers in the stadium" intends to elicit feelings that the players are structured, organized, and perhaps rigid or serious, not that they are literally members of the military. Metaphors that persist across multiple sentences or with complex descriptions are extended metaphors or "conceits".
  - Simile: a comparison between something and something else that are not typically connected, using extra words (such as "like" or "as") to explicitly mark the comparison. (Example: "From up on the hill, all the humans in the valley look like ants".)

=== Irony ===
Irony is any language that presents something in an opposite way to some kind of relevant expectations. Language that delivers words while intending the very opposite of their literal meanings is called verbal irony. Language that illustrates situations unfolding in the very opposite way from what relevant people expect is called situational irony.

==== Verbal irony ====
This is the simplest form of irony, in which speakers says the opposite of what they truly intend. Sarcasm is verbal irony with a biting tone, common even in casual everyday conversation to express meanness, playfulness, or humor. Another form is accismus: expressing the desire for something by denying it. A common example is when someone receives an award while declaring "I'm not worthy to receive this honor". Other devices come close to verbal irony, such as understatement (expressing something intense as though it is not intense) and euphemism (expressing a harsh concept with softening or soothing language).

==== Situational irony ====
This is when the author creates a surprising event or situation that is the exact opposite of what the reader would expect, often creating humor or an eerie feeling. For example, in Steinbeck's novel The Pearl, the reader may think that Kino and Juana would become happy and successful after discovering the "Pearl of the World", with all its value. However, their lives change dramatically for the worse after discovering it.

Similarly, in Shakespeare's Hamlet, the title character almost kills King Claudius at one point but resists because Claudius is praying and therefore may go to heaven. As Hamlet wants Claudius to go to hell, he waits. A few moments later, after Hamlet leaves the stage, Claudius reveals to the audience that he doesn't mean his prayers ("words without thoughts never to heaven go"), so Hamlet could have killed him after all.

==== Dramatic irony ====
Dramatic irony is when the audience knows something important about the story that one or more characters in the story do not know. For example, in William Shakespeare's Romeo and Juliet, the drama of Act V comes from the fact that the audience knows Juliet is alive, but Romeo thinks she's dead. If the audience had thought, like Romeo, that she was dead, the scene would not have had anywhere near the same power.

Likewise, in Edgar Allan Poe's "The Tell-Tale Heart", the energy at the end of the story comes from the fact that we know the narrator killed the old man, while the guests are oblivious. If we were as oblivious as the guests, there would be virtually no point in the story.

== Schemes ==
A linguistic scheme is a discourse-level literary device relying on intentional relations, or the exact ordering, of words inside phrases, clauses, and sentences.

=== Word repetition ===
Word repetition rhetorical devices operate via repeating words or phrases in various ways, usually for emphasis. Some types include:

- Anadiplosis/Conduplicatio: repetition the last word(s) of one sentence, phrase or clause at or near the beginning of the next. (Example "To die [is] to sleep;/ To sleep, perchance to dream..." in Shakespeare's Hamlet 3.1.) Conduplicatio is similar, involving repeating a key word in subsequent clauses (as in "Thou quiet soul, sleep thou a quiet sleep!" from Shakespeare's Richard III 5.3).
- Anaphora/Epistrophe/Symploce/Epanalepsis: repetition of the same word(s) at the beginning of successive sentences, phrases or clauses. (Example: "With mine own tears I wash away my balm,/ With mine own hands I give away my crown,/ With mine own tongue deny my sacred state,/ With mine own breath release all duty's rites" from Shakespeare's Richard II 4.1). Epistrophe is repeating the same word(s) at the end (as in "If you had known the virtue of the ring,/ Or half her worthiness that gave the ring,/ Or your own honour to contain the ring,/ You would not then have parted with the ring" in Shakespeare's The Merchant of Venice 5.1). Symploce is a simultaneous combination of both anaphora and epistrophe, but repeating different words at the start and end (as in Alfred Doolittle saying "I'll tell you, Governor, if you'll only let me get a word in. I'm willing to tell you. I'm wanting to tell you. I'm waiting to tell you", and then Henry Higgins responding "Pickering, this chap has a certain natural gift of rhetoric. Observe the rhythm of his native woodnotes wild. 'I'm willing to tell you. I'm wanting to tell you. I'm waiting to tell you.' Sentimental rhetoric! That's the Welsh strain in him. It also accounts for his mendacity and dishonesty" in George Bernard Shaw's Pygmalion). Epanalepsis repeats the same word(s) at the beginning and end (as in "Once more unto the breach, dear friends, once more!" in Shakespeare's Henry V 3.1).
- Epizeuxis: a repetition of the same word without interruption. (Example: "O horror! Horror! Horror!" in Shakespeare's Macbeth 2.3. Antanaclasis is repetition of the same word but in a different sense. The repeated word has two different meanings in the context of the sentence. Antanaclasis is often used when the repeated word has multiple definitions or ways it may be interpreted. Authors typically use this rhetorical strategy in order to emphasize a certain word that contributes to the overarching theme or idea, to create a rhythm in their writing, or to give off a witty or humorous tone. This can take advantage of polysemy. (Example: "We must, indeed, all hang together, or most assuredly we shall all hang separately" from Benjamin Franklin.)
- Diacope: the repetition of a word or phrase after an intervening word or clause. (Example: "A horse! A horse! My kingdom for a horse!" in Shakespeare's Richard III 5.4.)

=== Word relation ===
Word relation rhetorical devices operate via deliberate connections between words within a sentence.

- Antithesis/Antimetabole/Chiasmus: Antithesis involves putting together two opposite ideas in a sentence to achieve a contrasting effect. Contrast is emphasized by parallel but similar structures of the opposing phrases or clauses to draw the listeners' or readers' attention. Compared to chiasmus, the ideas must be opposites. (Example: "Some rise by sin, and some by virtue fall" in Shakespeare's Measure for Measure 2.1.) Antimetabole involves repeating but reversing the order of words, phrases or clauses. The exact same words are repeated, as opposed to antithesis or chiasmus. (Example: "Ask not what your country can do for you, ask what you can do for your country", from John F Kennedy's Inaugural Address.) Chiasmus involves parallel clause structure but in reverse order for the second part. This means that words or elements are repeated in the reverse order. The ideas thus contrasted are often related but not necessarily opposite. (Example: "But O, what damned minutes tells he o'er/ Who dotes, yet doubts; suspects, yet strongly loves!" in Shakespeare's Othello 3.3.)
- Asyndeton/Polysyndeton: Asyndeton is the removal of conjunctions like "or", "and", or "but" where it might have been expected. (Example: "Accursed, unhappy, wretched, hateful day!" in Shakespeare's Romeo and Juliet 4.4.) Polysyndeton is the use of more conjunctions than strictly needed. This device is often combined with anaphora. (Example: "We'll live,/ And pray, and sing, and tell old tales, and laugh/ At gilded butterflies, and hear poor rogue/ Talk of court news..." in Shakespeare's King Lear 5.3.)
- Auxesis/Catacosmesis: Auxesis is arranging words in a list from least to most significant. This can create climax. (Example: "Since brass, nor stone, nor earth, nor boundless sea,/ But sad mortality o'er-sways their power..." in Shakespeare's Sonnet 65.) Catacosmesis, the opposite, involves arranging them from most to least significant. (Example: "Nor brass, nor stone, nor parchment bears not one" in Shakespeare's The Winter's Tale 1.2.) This can create anticlimax for humour or other purposes. (Example: "He has seen the ravages of war, he has known natural catastrophes, he has been to singles bars", from Woody Allen.)
- Hypallage: Hypallage is an epithet transferred from its conventional referent to a second referent that the audience links with the first one. For instance, in the phrase "the sleepy countryside", it is the people who are living there who are sleepy, not the land itself.
- Hyperbaton: This occurs when two ordinary associated words or phrases are detached or unusually rearranged. The term is also used more generally for any figure of speech that transposes natural word order.
- Oxymoron: a two-word paradox often achieved through the deliberate use of antonyms. This creates an internal contradiction that can have rhetorical effect. (Example: "I could weep
  And I could laugh, I am light and heavy" in Shakespeare's Coriolanus 2.1.)
- Zeugma: the linking of two or more words or phrases that occupy the same position in a sentence to another word or phrase in the same sentence. This can take advantage of the latter word having multiple meanings depending on context to create a clever use of language that can make the sentence and the claim thus advanced more eloquent and persuasive.

In the following examples, 2 nouns (as direct objects) are linked to the same verb which must then be interpreted in 2 different ways.

He caught the train and a bad cold.

I held my breath and the door for you.

Dumbledore was striding serenely across the room wearing long midnight-blue robes and a perfectly calm expression.

— J. K. Rowling, Harry Potter and the Order of the Phoenix

Zeugma is sometimes defined broadly to include other ways in which one word in a sentence can relate to two or more others. Even simple constructions like multiple subjects linked to the same verb are then "zeugma without complication".

Fred excelled at sports; Harvey at eating; Tom with girls.

Friends, Romans, countrymen, lend me your ears.

— William Shakespeare, Julius Caesar 3.2

== General linguistic choices ==
=== Diction ===
Diction is a writer's or speaker's deliberate choice of specific words. Diction communicates not only meaning, but often emotion as well. Authors writing their texts consider not only a word's denotation but also its connotation. For example, a person may be described as stubborn or tenacious, both of which have the same basic meaning but are opposite in terms of their emotional background (the first is an insult, while the second is a compliment). Similarly, a bargain-seeker may be described as either thrifty (compliment) or stingy (insult). An author's diction is extremely important in discovering the narrator's tone, or attitude.

=== Syntax ===
Sentences can be long or short; constructed in the active voice or passive voice; and composed as simple, compound, complex, or compound-complex. They may also include such techniques as inversion or such structures as appositive phrases, verbal phrases (gerund, participle, and infinitive), and subordinate clauses (noun, adjective, and adverb). These tools can be highly effective in achieving an author's purpose.

An example is "The ghetto was ruled by neither German nor Jew; it was ruled by delusion" from Night by Elie Wiesel. In this sentence, Wiesel uses two parallel independent clauses written in the passive voice. The first clause establishes suspense about who rules the ghetto, and then the first few words of the second clause set up the reader with the expectation of an answer, which is metaphorically revealed only in the final word of the sentence.

==== Verb choices ====
Verbs, which provide actions (and states of being) in a sentence, have a variety of ways they can be modified in languages like English, including: grammatical tense, grammatical aspect, and grammatical mood. There are three basic tenses: past, present, and future. There are three main aspects: simple, perfect, and progressive. The perfect and progressive aspects convey information not strictly about time-period but about the change-across-time, or nature of time, occurring in a sentence. There are many moods (also called modes), with some important ones being: the indicative/declarative mood (ordinary statements that provide information or description), imperative mood (commands), and interrogative mood (questions). Other moods include the affirmative, negative, emphatic, conditional, and subjunctive.

== See also ==
- Glossary of rhetorical terms
- Narrative device
- Rhetorical modes
