= Climax (rhetoric) =

Arrangement of phrases in increasing order of importance

In rhetoric, a climax (Ancient Greek: κλῖμαξ, klîmax, lit. "staircase" or "ladder") is a figure of speech in which words, phrases, or clauses are arranged in order of increasing importance. In its use with clauses, it is also sometimes known as auxesis (lit. "growth").

== Usage ==
Climax is frequently used in persuasion (particularly advertising) to create false dilemmas and to focus attention on the positive aspects of the subject at hand. The initial inferior options make the final term seem still better by comparison than it would appear in isolation: "X is good, Y is better, Z is best" is a standard format. It can also be used in reverse to make the initial term seem better by comparison: "A isn't perfect but B is worse and C is worst."

== Examples ==
- From the First Letter to the Corinthians: "There are three things that will endure: faith, hope, and love. But the greatest of these is love."
- George Wald from A Generation in Search of a Future: "I think we've reached a point of great decision, not just for our nation, not only for all humanity, but for life upon the earth."
- William Shakespeare from The Passionate Pilgrim: "...Lost, vaded, broken, dead within an hour."
- William Shakespeare from Richard II: "...O'erthrows thy joys, friends, fortune and thy state"
- The Smiths "So you go and you stand on your own, And you leave on your own, And you go home and you cry and you want to die." from How Soon Is Now, lyrics by Morrissey

== Anticlimax ==
An anticlimax or anti-climax is an abrupt descent (either deliberate or unintended) on the part of a speaker or writer from the dignity of idea at which they appeared to aim, as in:

"The English poet Herrick expressed the same sentiment when he suggested that we should gather rosebuds while we may. Your elbow is in the butter, sir."

As a relative term, anticlimax requires a greater or lesser climax to precede it in order to have proper effect. An anticlimax can be intentionally employed only for a jocular or satiric purpose. It frequently partakes of the nature of antithesis, as in:

"Die and endow a college or a cat."

== See also ==
- Figure of speech
- Bathos
- Climax as a narrative element
