= Authorship of Titus Andronicus =

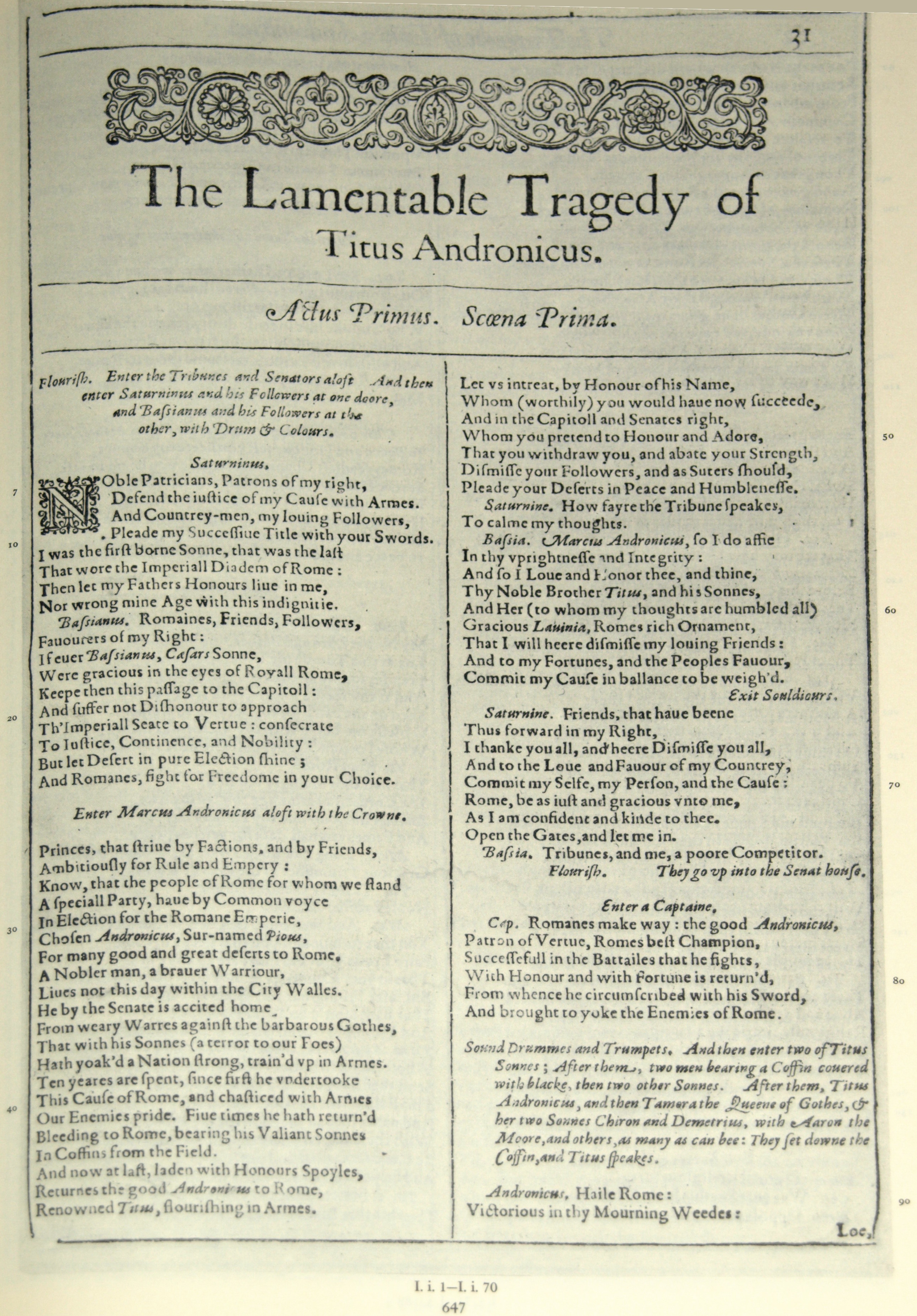
Facsimile of the first page of The Lamentable Tragedy of Titus Andronicus from the First Folio, published in 1623

The authorship of Titus Andronicus has been debated since the late 17th century. Titus Andronicus, probably written between 1588 and 1593, appeared in three quarto editions from 1594 to 1601 with no named author. It was first published under William Shakespeare's name in the 1623 First Folio of his plays. However, as with some of his early and late plays, scholars have long surmised that Shakespeare might have collaborated with another playwright. Other plays have also been examined for evidence of co-authorship, but none has been as closely scrutinised or as consistently questioned as Titus. The principal contender for the co-authorship is George Peele.

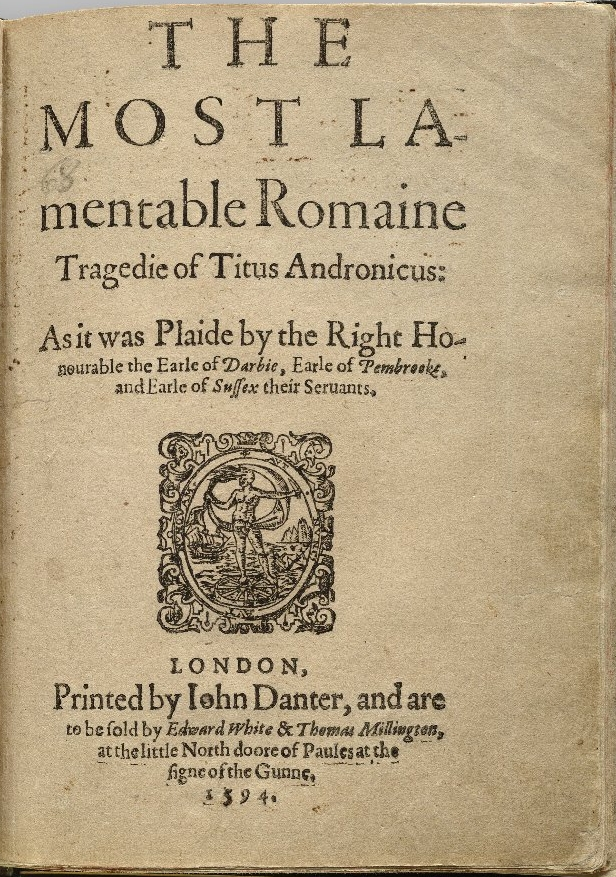
Title page of the first quarto of Titus Andronicus (1594)

Very little external evidence is extant regarding the question of authorship. None of the three quarto editions of Titus (1594, 1600 and 1611) name the author, normal practice for Elizabethan plays. Francis Meres lists Titus as one of Shakespeare's tragedies in Palladis Tamia in 1598, and John Heminges and Henry Condell included it in the First Folio in 1623. While this supports Shakespeare's authorship of the play, questions have tended to focus on the perceived lack of quality in the writing, and in the twentieth and twenty-first centuries, the play's stylistic similarities to the work of contemporaneous dramatists.

In 1687 Edward Ravenscroft was the first to question Shakespeare's authorship in the introduction to his own adaptation of the play, Titus Andronicus, or The Rape of Lavinia,

I have been told by some anciently conversant with the Stage, that it was not Originally his, but brought by a private Author to be Acted and he only gave some Master-touches to one or two of the Principal Parts or Characters; this I am apt to believe, because 'tis the most incorrect and indigested piece in all his Works, It seems rather a heap of Rubbish then a Structure.

Ravenscroft's vague comments tend not to be taken at face value by most critics. Nevertheless, his idea seems to have been seized upon, and several 18th-century editors made similar claims; Nicholas Rowe in The Works of Mr. William Shakespear in Six Volumes (1709), Alexander Pope in The Works of Mr. William Shakespear (1725), Lewis Theobald in Shakespeare Restored (1726), Samuel Johnson and George Steevens in The Plays of William Shakespeare (1765) and Edmond Malone in The Plays and Poems of William Shakspeare (1790). All questioned Shakespeare's authorship, primarily due to the violence in the play, which they saw as far in excess of anything else in the canon, and what they perceived as uninspired verse, with each one concluding that at most Shakespeare wrote a scene or two. Other 18th-century scholars who questioned Shakespeare's authorship included William Guthrie in 1747, John Upton in 1748, Benjamin Heath in 1765, Richard Farmer in 1766, John Pinkerton in 1785, and John Monck Mason also in 1785. So strong had the anti-Shakespearean movement become during the eighteenth century that in 1794, Thomas Percy wrote in the introduction to Reliques of Ancient English Poetry, "Shakespeare's memory has been fully vindicated from the charge of writing the play by the best critics."

This trend continued into the 19th century. In 1817, for example, William Hazlitt denied the possibility of Shakespeare's authorship in Characters of Shakespear's Plays. Also in 1817, Samuel Taylor Coleridge made a similar claim in Biographia Literaria. Subsequently, in 1832, the Globe Illustrated Shakespeare went so far as to claim there was a universal agreement on the matter of authorship due to the un-Shakespearean "barbarity" of the play's action. Similarly, in An Introduction to the Literature of Europe in the Fifteenth, Sixteenth and Seventeenth Centuries (1840), Henry Hallam wrote "Titus Andronicus is now, by common consent, denied to be, in any sense, a production of Shakespeare." In 1857, Charles Bathurst reiterated the claim that the play was so badly written, Shakespeare simply could not have had anything to do with it.

However, even in the midst of these doubts, there were voices arguing for Shakespeare's authorship. A major early defender of Shakespeare's claim to authorship was Edward Capell. In his 1768 ten-volume edition of the complete works of Shakespeare, Mr William Shakespeare, His Comedies, Histories and Tragedies, Capell acknowledged that the play was poorly written, but he argued that the violence was normal in the Elizabethan theatre, and he also pointed out the unlikelihood of Condell and Heminges including a play in the First Folio which they knew not to be by Shakespeare. Capell argued that nothing would be achieved by such a move, and in any case, there would have been any number of people who could have disputed such a thing. Capell also argued on aesthetic grounds that the play was Shakespearean, pointing specifically to Act 3 as being indicative of Shakespeare's style, and citing such elements as classical allusions and versification as more akin to Shakespeare than any other dramatist of the time.

In 1843, Charles Knight, in the Preface to his pictorial edition of Shakespeare, specifically challenged claims that there was universal agreement that Shakespeare did not write the play. Knight pointed out that there was no such consent, especially in Germany, where Shakespeare was acknowledged by most major scholars as being the author. Knight made specific reference to August Wilhelm Schlegel and Hermann Ulrici.

From the twentieth-century onward, criticism moved away from trying to prove or disprove that Shakespeare wrote the play, with most scholars now accepting that he was definitely involved in the composition in some manner, and has instead come to focus on the issue of co-authorship. The examination of the theory of co-authorship began in 1905, in John Mackinnon Robertson's Did Shakespeare Write Titus Andronicus? In an analysis of the feminine endings and general vocabulary, Robertson concluded that "much of the play is written by George Peele, and it is hardly less certain that much of the rest was written by Robert Greene or Kyd, with some by Marlowe." Robertson also suggested that Thomas Lodge may have contributed. Similarly, in 1919, T.M. Parrott reached the conclusion that Shakespeare revised the original work of Peele. Like Robertson, Parrott paid particular attention to feminine endings, which he argued were more abundant in Shakespeare than in any of his contemporaries. In Shakespeare's other work, feminine endings tended to be distributed evenly throughout the plays, but in Titus some scenes had far more than others. This led Parrott to conclude that there were two authors, and upon comparison with the distribution of feminine endings in other plays of the era, that the other author must be Peele. Parrott specifically concluded that 2.1 and 4.1 were by Peele (feminine endings of 2.3% and 2.5% respectively). In 1931, Philip Timberlake modified Parrott's methodology and concluded that feminine endings composed 8.4% of the entire play, with Act I only 2.7%, and both 2.1 and 4.1 only 2.4% each. Other parts of the play had substantially more, such as 5.1 for example, which had 20.2%, or 3.2 which had 12.6%. In a comparative analysis, Timberlake discovered that Greene averaged 0.1-1.6%, Marlowe 0.4-3.7%, Kyd 1.2-10.2% and Peele 1.5-5.4%, with Shakespeare averaging 4.3-16.8%. These figures led Timberlake to conclude that Shakespeare definitely had a major hand in the play, but was not the sole author. He did not posit any specific collaborator, but suggested that his findings were in line with those of scholars who found traces of Peele or Greene.

== Why Peele? ==
The main rationale for the predominance of Peele as co-author is due to certain linguistic characteristics which have been detected in the play. For example, J. Dover Wilson writes of the repetition of phrases and sentiments in Act 1 that "most of the clichés and tricks are indubitably Peele's. No dramatist of the age is so apt to repeat himself or so much given to odd or strained phrases." Robertson identified 133 words and phrases in Titus which he felt strongly indicated Peele. Many of these concern Peele's poem The Honour of the Garter (1593). One word in particular has advanced the Peele argument; "palliament" (1.1.182), meaning robe and possibly derived from the Latin "pallium" and/or "palludamentum." As first illustrated by George Steevens in 1773, this word occurs in only one other place outside Titus, in The Honour of the Garter. In relation to this, however, Hereward Thimbleby Price has argued that borrowing by Shakespeare is just as likely, if not more so, than repetition by Peele, something reiterated by Jonathan Bate; "the problem with all the arguments based on verbal parallels is that imitation is always as likely as authorship." Alan Hughes further points out that because the play appears to have undergone a period of revision, the situation is complicated even more, as it is unknown when the word was added; initially or during the revision.

Another commonly cited word is "architect". Titus is the only play in which Shakespeare used the word, whereas Peele used it four times. However, it was also commonly used by their contemporaries, so it provides no solid evidence of Peele's authorship. This is because, as Jonathan Bate has argued, a major problem with the vocabulary/grammar argument is that not only must certain words and grammatical constructions be shown to be common to Peele and uncommon to Shakespeare, they must also be shown to be uncommon to every other dramatist of the period as well, as only then do they provide direct evidence of Peele's authorship. A similar argument has been made regarding the perceived lack of quality in the play. Sylvan Barnet, in his 1963 edition of the play for the Signet Classic Shakespeare argues "however displeased we may be by part or all of Titus, there is no utterly convincing evidence that it is not entirely by Shakespeare." Similarly, Eugene M. Waith argues, "That Shakespeare had a grander tragic vision or wrote finer dramatic poetry in other plays is no argument that he did not write this one."

The first major critic to challenge Robertson and Parrott was E.K. Chambers. Writing in 1930, in an essay entitled "The Disintegration of Shakespeare"; Chambers reacted to Robertson's general dismissal of the authoritativeness of the First Folio, and although he never mentions Titus specifically, he does set about countering Robertson's parallel vocabulary theory in general. Chambers’ criticisms of Robertson's methodologies have been accepted ever since, and Robertson's findings are no longer considered valid. Subsequently, in 1933, Arthur M. Sampley employed the techniques of Parrott to argue against Peele as co-author. In his analysis of four of Peele's plays, The Arraignment of Paris (1584), The Love of King David and fair Bathseba (1588), The Famous Chronicle of King Edward the First (1593) and The Old Wives' Tale (1595), Sampley concluded that characteristics of Peele include complex plots, extraneous material in the dialogue, and a general lack of unity, none of which are present in Titus. Sampley argued that Act 1 in particular, usually cited as the most likely part of the play to have been written by Peele (such as by Dover Wilson for example, who provides a damning close reading of the theatrical quality of the act), is extremely tightly unified and sets up everything that follows perfectly. This is unlike anything found in any of Peele's plays.

In 1943, building on Sampley's work, Hereward Thimbleby Price wrote, "the best parallel by which we can test authorship is construction. Phrases may be borrowed here and there but construction refers to the planning of the work as a whole." Price concluded that the best examples of similar constructions to Titus are found in other plays by Shakespeare, not Peele. Like Sampley, Price concludes that although the opening scene does sound like Peele it is nothing like him in either construction or intent; "nothing in the work of Shakespeare's contemporaries can be compared to it for a moment." In a more general sense, Price argues that the play as a whole exhibited "intricacy with clearness, a firm hand on the story, a swift succession of effective situations logically leading out of what precedes and on to what follows, these are qualities lacking in the dramatists who are supposed to have shared in the composition of Titus." He also argued that the uneven distribution of feminine endings noted by Parrott and Timberlake was typical of Shakespeare's early plays.

In 1948, Dover Wilson rejected Chambers, Sampley and Price, and instead supported Parrott and Timberlake, believing that Shakespeare edited a play originally written by Peele; "we must look to George Peele for the authorship, not only of Act 1, but of most of the basic text upon which Shakespeare worked." However, he goes on to assert that Shakespeare so thoroughly revised Peele "that Meres and the editors of the Folio were fully within their rights in calling it his. The aesthetic responsibility for it is therefore his also." He dismisses the involvement of Marlowe, Greene and Kyd and uses evidence of grammatical and metrical repetition in Act 1, especially the use of the vocative case. He lists many pages of parallels with Peele's work; the poems The Tale of Troy (1579), The Honour of the Garter, An Eclogue Gratulatory (1589), Polyhymnia (1590), Descensus Astraeae (1591) and the plays The Arraignment of Paris (1584), The Battle of Alcazar (1588), David and Bathsheba (1588) and Edward I (1593). His theory is that originally, Peele wrote a short play for provincial performance by a touring company during the plague years of 1592–1594. However, upon returning to London, the play was deemed too short, and needed expanding, which is where Shakespeare got involved. Dover Wilson suggests that the reason Shakespeare was asked was because he was working on the thematically similar poems Venus and Adonis and The Rape of Lucrece at the time. However, because Shakespeare was unhappy working on the play, he purposely wrote badly. According to Dover Wilson "you can see him laughing behind his hand through most of the scenes he rehandled."

In his Arden Shakespeare 2nd Series edition of the play in 1953, J.C. Maxwell stated that he wished he could assert that Shakespeare was the sole author, but because he was reminded so much of Peele's grammatical constructions, especially in Act 1, he could not. In 1957, R.F. Hill approached the issue in another way; using rhetoric. He took 130 rhetorical devices and analysed their occurrence in eleven early Shakespearean plays, finding Titus anomalous in several ways. Alliteration was far more frequent in Titus than elsewhere, but Titus also contained far fewer sustained metaphors than in other plays in the canon. Both frequent alliteration and absence of lengthy metaphors occur most in Act 1. Hill also analysed antimetabole, epanalepsis, epizeuxis and "the repetition of a clause with an inversion in the order of its grammatical parts." His discovery that Act 1 was unique in the amount of all of these rhetorical devices when compared with the rest of the canon led him to conclude that Shakespeare did not write it.

In 1979, MacDonald P. Jackson approached the issue from another new perspective; a rare word test. His results showed a marked difference between Act 1, 2.1 and 4.1 on the one hand, and the rest of the play on the other. He showed that in Act 1, 2.1 and 4.1, rare vocabulary occurred much less frequently than in any other Shakespeare play, whereas in the rest of the play rare words are more common, placing it closest to The Taming of the Shrew. Jackson acknowledged that this discrepancy could possibly have arisen from Shakespeare returning to edit a play he wrote in his youth, and complicating the vocabulary at that time, but he favours the suggestion of Peele as co-author, especially insofar as the rare word distribution of Act 1 is roughly analogous to Peele's own plays.

In his 1984 edition of the play for The Oxford Shakespeare, Eugene M. Waith argued for Shakespeare's sole authorship. Believing that Titus was Shakespeare's first attempt at tragedy, he argued that any lapses can be attributed to uncertainty and inexperience rather than co-authorship. Brian Vickers, however, is highly critical of Waith's analysis, attacking his "blanket refusal either to report the case for co-authorship fairly, or to engage in a series evaluation of its arguments." He also believes that Waith's "evidence consists largely in suppressing the evidence of other scholars." In the Oxford Shakespeare Complete Works of 1986, in his introduction to the play, Stanley Wells makes no reference to the authorship debate whatsoever, but in the 1987 Textual Companion, Gary Taylor explicitly states that Shakespeare appears to have written only part of the play. Accepting the evidence of feminine endings which seem to suggest that Shakespeare did not write Act 1, 2.1 and 4.1, Taylor supported Jackson's findings in 1979.

In 1987, Marina Tarlinskaja used a quantitative analysis of the occurrence of stresses in the iambic pentameter line, producing a stress profile for each play studied. Her complex analysis divided Titus into an A part (Act 1, 2.1 and 4.1) and a B part (everything else). She ultimately concluded that part A was written in a more archaic style than part B, and that each part was almost certainly written by a different person. Part B corresponded to stress analysis elsewhere in Shakespeare's early drama; part A to Peele's later drama.

In his 1994 edition of the play for the New Cambridge Shakespeare, Alan Hughes dismissed the possibility of Shakespeare having a co-author. He believes that in a first draft of the play written before Shakespeare came to London, and which is now lost, Shakespeare was heavily influenced by Peele, but when he returned to edit the play c.1593 he removed much of the Peele influence, although he left Act 1 untouched. Again, Vickers is highly critical of Hughes' methods, believing that he simply wasn't familiar enough with the scholarship to make any kind of claim regarding authorship, and criticising his "refusal either to cite the scholarly tradition fairly or to think for himself about the large stylistic discrepancies within the play." In his 2006 revised edition of the play, Hughes' arguments remained unchanged, and he makes no response to Vickers' criticisms.

In 1995, Brian Boyd tackled the issue by focusing on repetition in the parts of the play attributed to Peele. He illustrated that references to Rome ("Romans", "Rome's" etc.) occur 68 times in 495 lines (1 in every 7 lines), but elsewhere in the play such references occur only 54 times in 1944 lines (1 in 36). This low figure matches Shakespeare's other Roman plays; Julius Caesar (1 in 38), Coriolanus (1 in 34) and Antony and Cleopatra (1 in 39). This suggested to Boyd that Act 1 was unique. He also analysed the use of the words "brother" and "brethren". In Act 1, "brethren" is used four times, but elsewhere in the play only once. However, Act 1 uses "brother" only once, but elsewhere it is used seven times. In their other plays, Shakespeare uses "brother" much more often than "brethren", whereas Peele tended to favour "brethren", again indicative of the uniqueness of Act 1 and tentative evidence for Peele's co-authorship.

In his 1995 edition of the play for the Arden Shakespeare 3rd series, Jonathan Bate argued that Shakespeare almost certainly wrote the play alone. However, since that time, Bate has come out in support of Brian Vickers' 2002 book Shakespeare, Co-Author which restates the case for Peele as the author of Act 1. Writing in the program for the 2003 Royal Shakespeare Company production of the play, Bate states

if the play has a fault, it is that the formality of both language and action in the opening scenes create a sense of stiffness that suggests classicism at its most tedious. This is probably not Shakespeare's fault: modern scholarship has persuasively demonstrated by means of close stylistic analysis that Titus Andronicus was begun by another dramatist, George Peele, who had a high-level classical education and a taste for large-scale symmetrical stage encounters spoken in high-flown rhetoric. We don't know whether the play was written as a purposeful collaboration or whether Shakespeare came in to do a re-write or to complete an unfinished work. Nor do we know at precisely what point the writing became his alone - though there is no doubt that he is the author of all the most dramatic scenes, from the rape through the hand-chopping to the fly-killing banquet to the feast at the climax.

In 1996, Macdonald Jackson returned to the authorship question by focusing on the stage directions in the 1594 quarto (Q1) and compared them to stage directions in Peele. In particular, the phrase "and others as many as can be" is found in both Titus (1.1.69) and Peele's Edward I (1.1.1). Due to the lack of specificity, this stage direction is usually taken as authorial (stage directions added by the theatre or acting company tend to be more specific). Jackson pointed out that these two examples are the only recorded examples in all of Elizabethan theatre. He also identified a hybrid form of speech headings combined with stage business in Q1; e.g. "Marcus Andronicus with the Crowne" (1.1.17) and "all kneele and say" (1.1.386). Nowhere else in all of Shakespeare is this hybridisation seen, but it is common throughout Peele, especially in Edward I e.g. "Longshanks kisses them both and speaks", "Bishop speaks to her in her bed". Jackson found twenty examples in Edward I; six each in The Battle of Alcazar and David and Bathseba and eleven in The Arraignment of Paris. He combined these discoveries with a new metrical analysis of the function words "and" and "with". In Act 1 of Titus, the rate of these words is every 12.7 lines, but elsewhere in the play it is every 24.7 lines. Elsewhere in Shakespeare, the lowest rate is in The Comedy of Errors (17.6), but in Peele's plays, the rate is always between 8.3 and 13.6. Jackson concluded that the chances of this being a coincidence are less than one in ten thousand, arguing that "Peele shows the same partiality for "and" and "with" that distinguishes Act 1 of Titus Andronicus from the rest of the Shakespeare canon." Subsequently, in 1997, Jackson revised Boyd's figures somewhat, pointing out that "brothers" and "brethren" occur nine times each in Titus; eight of the examples of "brethren" are in Act 1, but only one example of "brothers". In Shakespeare's early plays, there are twenty-three uses of "brothers" and only two of "brethren", whereas in Peele there are nine uses of "brethren" and only one of "brothers".

The most extensive analysis of the co-authorship theory is that of Brian Vickers in 2002. A strong advocate of the Peele theory, Vickers opens his preface by arguing "given that collaboration was very common in Elizabethan, Jacobean and Caroline theatre, and that every major and most minor dramatists shared in the writing of plays, it would be highly unusual if Shakespeare had not done so." As well as elaborating on the work of previous analysts such as Parrott, Timberlake, Dover Wilson, Tarlinskaja, Boyd and Jackson, Vickers devises three additional authorship tests. The first is an analysis of polysyllabic words (words of three syllables or more, excluding names), a test which has been successfully used to distinguish the work of John Webster and Thomas Dekker. Vickers shows that in Act 1, 2.1 and 4.1, polysyllabic words occur every 2.8 lines, a comparable number to elsewhere in Peele. Elsewhere in Titus, however, the rate is every 3.3 lines, similar to elsewhere in Shakespeare. His second test involves counting examples of alliteration, a technique favoured by Peele throughout his career. In Act 1, 2.1 and 4.1, alliteration is found at a rate of once every 2.7 lines. Elsewhere in the play, it occurs every 4.3 lines. The high rate of Act 1 corresponds to the average rate in Peele and the low rate elsewhere to the rate in Shakespeare. The third test is counting vocatives. In Act 1, 2.1 and 4.1, the rate of vocatives is once every 4.2 lines. Elsewhere it is once every 8.7 lines. As comparison, in Peele's Edward I, the rate is once every 4.3 lines, and throughout Shakespeare, it never falls below once every 6.3 lines. Again, the numbers seem to equate Peele with Act 1, 2.1 and 4.1 and Shakespeare with the rest of the play. Vickers also attempts to show that Shakespeare is much more adept at employing rhetorical devices than Peele; and gives numerous examples throughout the play of the use of antimetabole, anadiplosis, epanalepsis, epizeuxis, articulus, epanorthosis, epistrophe, aposiopesis, anaphora, polyptoton, synoeciosis, polysyndeton and asteismus. His analysis of these devices leads him to conclude "whether using the same rhetorical figures as Peele had used, or deploying his own much wider thesaurus, Shakespeare distinguishes himself from his co-author by the economy, functionality and the expressive power with which he employs these traditional resources."
