= Parallel syntax =

Rhetorical device

In rhetoric, parallel syntax (also known as parallel construction, parallel structure, and parallelism) is a rhetorical device that consists of repetition among adjacent sentences or clauses. The repeated sentences or clauses provide emphasis to a central theme or idea the author is trying to convey. Parallelism is the mark of a mature language speaker.

In language, syntax is the structure of a sentence, thus parallel syntax can also be called parallel sentence structure. This rhetorical tool improves the flow of a sentence as it adds a figure of balance to sentences it is implemented into. It also aids in making the sentence more concise by eliminating unnecessary words that could distract the reader from the main idea and following a clear pattern of language. It is a simple way to achieve clarity and avoid ambiguity, but it is avoided unless the relationship of the ideas or details they express justifies parallelism. Parallel structure is like the derived conjunction analysis because it assumes several underlying complete sentences.

In addition to providing emphasis, it is evident that parallel structure appeals to the reader or listener in a variety of ways as well. Primarily, the repetition of clauses promotes a heightened mental ability to process the sentence as a whole; studies have shown that the reiteration of the second clause will increase the speed an individual can process the sentence. Furthermore, it decreases the load of information needed to be processed by the reader, facilitating comprehension. Because it is more appealing, it is also more persuasive.

According to Aristotle, persuasion is created through parallel syntax by means of repetition. Recapping crucial aspects of an argument through properly created phrases and clauses further embeds the idea into the listener, ultimately resulting in persuasion. However, these clauses must be created precisely, in a way similar to poetry, in order to maximize the effect. For example, paired sentences, phrases, or clauses must be created with equal structure in regards to verb and noun choice, along with both number of syllables and meter; according to Aristotle, the more ways in which these aspects match, the more persuasive the argument will be. Faulty parallelism most often occurs with coordinating conjunctions that connect nouns and adjectives.

Using parallel syntax among two clauses is known as an isocolon, when among three clauses it is known as a tricolon. Having similar syntactical structure among clauses or phrases helps the reader identify the similarity of ideas proposed within them. Isocolon is made up of the Greek words iso (equal) and kolon (member), so each part or clause is the same length. A tricolon has 3 clauses that do not need to be the same length. An isocolon can be a tricolon but a tricolon cannot be an isocolon.

Parallel syntax is often used in conjunction with antithesis, anaphora, asyndeton, climax, epistrophe and symploce.

== Examples ==
Parallel structure

- Usage of the same verb form in each clause: "She wants to sing, she wants to act, she wants to dance." This uses the infinitive form of the verbs which creates parallel structure.

Faulty Parallelism

- Coordination of nouns and adjectives with a linking verb: "The old car was a relic and rusty."
- Mixing of verb forms: "She wants to sing, she wants to act, she wants to be a dancer." The final clause in this sentence does not match the infinitive form of the preceding two.

Examples of Parallel structure used alongside other rhetorical devices:

- Anaphora (repetition of the beginning of successive clauses): "I live, I love, I laugh."
- Epistrophe (repetition of the end of successive clauses): "Work stinks, wife stinks, dog stinks."
- Climax (increasing in intensified meaning): “I like him, I love him, I need him.”
- Asyndeton (purposely leaving out conjunctions to compact a sentence): “Reduce, reuse, recycle.”
- Symploce (simultaneous use of anaphora and epistrophe): “If you sing I will smile, if you laugh I will smile, if you love I will smile.”
- Antithesis (two opposite ideas put together to achieve a contrasting effect): “One small step for a man, one giant leap for mankind.”

Examples of Isocolons and Tricolons:

- Isocolon: “Veni, vidi, vici.”
- Tricolon: “I came, I saw, I conquered.”

"Veni, vidi, vici" is both an isocolon and a tricolon, whereas "I came, I saw, I conquered" is only a tricolon: the third clause is not the same length as the first two.

== History ==
The first known instances of parallel syntax can be traced back to Aristotle in his book Rhetoric. Aristotle underlines the fact that it is very useful in persuasion to pair multiple sentences, each with very similar clauses and phrases to the point that they are equal or nearly equal in syllable count; Aristotle perfected this art by creating various examples to be cited in a very metrically organized way. However, although Aristotle did provide examples and a definition, there is evidence to support that he was simply not comfortable with the amount of power tied to the styling of sentences; with a proper design of sentence, Aristotle believed that one can wield incredible amounts of persuasive power.
