= Parallelism (rhetoric) =

Rhetorical device

Parallelism (or thought rhyme) is a rhetorical device that compounds words or phrases that have equivalent meanings so as to create a definite pattern. This structure is particularly effective when "specifying or enumerating pairs or series of like things". A scheme of balance, parallelism represents "one of the basic principles of grammar and rhetoric".

Parallelism as a rhetorical device is used in many languages and cultures around the world in poetry, epics, songs, written prose and speech, from the folk level to the professional. An entire issue of the journal Oral Tradition has been devoted to articles on parallelism in languages from all over. It is very often found in Biblical poetry and in proverbs in general.

== Examples ==
The following sentences and verses possess "similarity in structure" in words and phrases:

She tried to make the law clear, precise and equitable.

In the quote above, the compounded adjectives serve as parallel elements and support the noun "law".

Her purpose was to impress the ignorant, to perplex the dubious, and to confound the scrupulous.

In the above quote, three infinitive verb phrases produce the parallel structure supporting the noun "purpose". Note that this rhetorical device requires that the coordinate elements agree with one another grammatically: "nouns with nouns, infinitive verb phrases with infinitive verb phrases and adverb clauses with adverb clauses."

When the coordinate elements possess the same number of words (or in the example below, the same number of syllables) the scheme is termed isocolon:

I'll give my jewels for a set of beads,
My gorgeous palace for a hermitage,
My gay apparel for an almsman's gown
My figured goblets for a dish of wood. – Shakespeare, Richard II

Synonymous parallelism in which one couplet expresses similar concepts can also be combined with antithetical parallelism in which a second couplet contrasts with the first. For example, synonymous and antithetical parallelism occur in Revelation 22:11:

A Let the evildoer still do evil,

A' and the filthy still be filthy,

B and the righteous still do right.

B' and the holy still be holy.

== Forms ==
Parallelisms of various sorts are the chief rhetorical device of Biblical poetry in the tristich and in multiples of distich parallels and also in the poetry of many other cultures around the world, particularly in their oral traditions. Robert Lowth coined the term parallelismus membrorum (parallelism of members, i.e. poetic lines) in his 1788 book, Lectures on the Sacred Poetry of the Hebrew Nation. Roman Jakobson pioneered the secular study of parallelism in poetic-linguistic traditions around the world, including his own Russian tradition.

Chinese and Vietnamese classical poetry and prose have frequently made use of parallelism. Conversations between learned men in many cases involved exchanging single parallel couplets as a form of playing with words, as well as a kind of mental duel. In a parallel couplet, not only must the content, the parts of speech, the mythological and historico-geographical allusions, be all separately matched and balanced, but most of the tones must also be paired reciprocally. Even tones are conjoined with inflected ones, and vice versa.

Parallelisms in artistic speech are common in some languages of Mesoamerica, such as Nahuatl (Aztec) and some Mayan languages. It has also been observed in a language of Indonesia (that Fox imprecisely referred to as "Rotinese") and Navajo. Other research has found parallelisms in the languages of the Ural-Altaic area (including Finnish-Karelian folk poetry and the epics and songs of the Turkic and Mongolian peoples) and Toda, suggesting wider distribution among Dravidian languages.

In the Limba language community of Sierra Leone and Guinea, some prayers are formed with parallelisms.

== Proverbs ==
Parallelisms in proverbs are very common in languages around the world. Parallel structures in short passages such as proverbs help direct the listener or reader to compare the parallel elements and thus more easily deduce the point.

- Give a man a fish and you feed him for a day; teach a man to fish and you feed him for a lifetime. (English proverb)
- Wounds caused by knives will heal, wounds caused by words will not heal. (Tamil proverb)
- The truth has legs and ran away; the lie has no legs and must stay. (Yiddish proverb)
- When there is food in the house, what matter if a guest arrives? When there is faith, what is death? (Pashto proverb)
- The cow which leaves first will be broken at the horn; the cow which remains in the back will be broken at the tail. (Alaaba proverb from Ethiopia)

== Riddles ==
In many cultures, riddles are a form of wisdom literature, similar to proverbs. Many riddles are formed with parallelisms.

Yoruba:

- “Elephant dies, and this one eats him;
- buffalo dies, and this one eats him;
- this one dies, there is no one who eats him.” Answer: fire

Tamil:

- “If you chase him off, he comes again;
- but if you stroke him, he dies.” Answer: mosquito.

Gidole language:

- "When I am going I am hungry.
- When I return I am full."

== See also ==
- Anaphora
- Antithetic parallelism
- Ars longa, vita brevis
- Chiasmus
- Exergasia
- Horror aequi
- Syntactic parallelism

== Sources ==
- Baldrick, Chris. 2008. Oxford Dictionary of Literary Terms. Oxford University Press. New York. ISBN 978-0-19-920827-2
- Corbett, Edward P. J. and Connors, Robert J. 1999. Style and Statement. Oxford University Press. New York, Oxford. ISBN 0-19-511543-0
- Forsyth, Mark. 2014. The Elements of Eloquence. Berkley Publishing Group/Penguin Publishing. New York. ISBN 978-0-425-27618-1
- Special issue of the journal Oral Tradition from 2017, Volume 31, Issue 2: "Parallelism in Verbal Art and Performance".
- Grosser, Emmylou J. 2021. What symmetry can do that parallelism can’t: Line perception and poetic effects in the song of Deborah (Judges 5:2–31). Vetus Testamentum 71(2):175–204. https://doi.org/10.1163/15685330-12341455.
