= Parallelism (grammar) =

Concept in grammar

In grammar, parallelism, also known as parallel structure or parallel construction, is a balance within one or more sentences of similar phrases or clauses that have the same grammatical structure. The application of parallelism affects readability and may make texts easier to process or comprehend.

Parallelism may be accompanied by other figures of speech such as antithesis, anaphora, asyndeton, climax, epistrophe, and symploce.

== Examples ==
Compare the following examples:

| Lacking parallelism | Parallel |
|---|---|
| "She likes cooking, jogging, and to read." | "She likes cooking, jogging, and reading." "She likes to cook, jog, and read." |
| "He likes to play baseball and running." | "He likes playing baseball and running." "He likes to play baseball and to run." |
| "The dog ran across the yard, jumped over the fence, and sprinted away." | "The dog ran across the yard, jumped over the fence, and sprinted down the alley." |

All of the above examples are grammatically correct, even if they lack parallelism: "cooking", "jogging", and "to read" are all grammatically valid conclusions to "She likes", for instance. The first nonparallel example has a mix of gerunds and infinitives. To make it parallel, the sentence can be rewritten with all gerunds or all infinitives. The second example pairs a gerund with a regular noun. Parallelism can be achieved by converting both terms to gerunds or to infinitives. The final phrase of the third example does not include a definite location, such as "across the yard" or "over the fence"; rewriting to add one completes the sentence's parallelism.

== In rhetoric ==
Parallelism is often used as a rhetorical device. Examples:

- "The inherent vice of capitalism is the unequal sharing of blessings. The inherent virtue of Socialism is the equal sharing of miseries." — Winston Churchill, House of Commons, 22 October 1945.
- The use of anaphora (repetition at the beginning of successive clauses) for Martin Luther King Jr.'s 1963 "I Have a Dream" speech: "I have a dream that one day this nation will rise up...; I have a dream that one day on the red hills of Georgia...; I have a dream that one day even the state of Mississippi..." — Martin Luther King Jr., I Have a Dream" speech, 28 August 1963.

== See also ==
- Foregrounding
- Prosody (linguistics)
- Repetition (rhetorical device)
