= Last Adam =

Pauline title for Jesus (e.g. 1 Cor. 15:45)

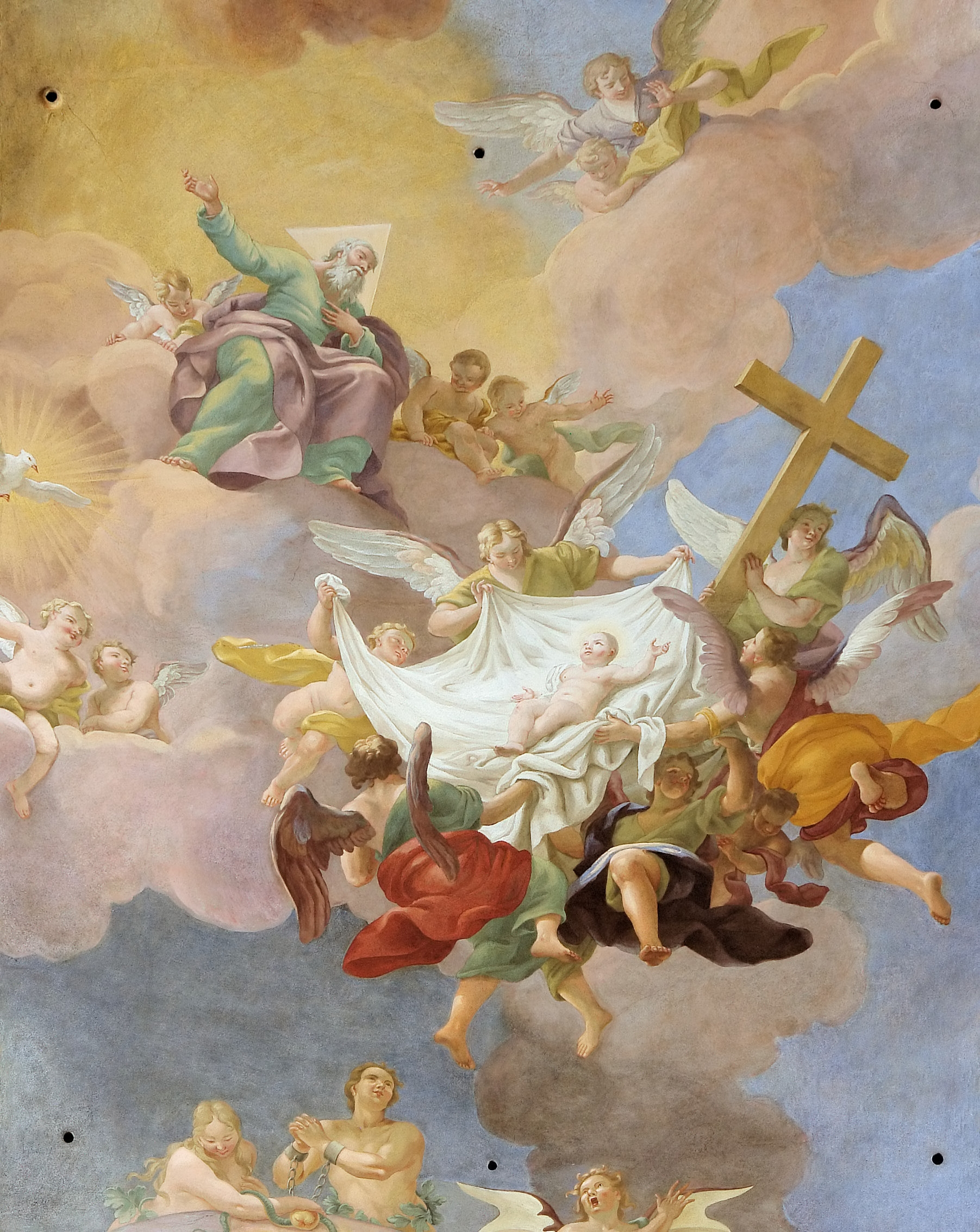
Glory of the Newborn Christ in Presence of God the Father and the Holy Spirit. Detail of a ceiling painting by Daniel Gran in St. Anne's Church, Vienna. Adam and Eve are portrayed below, in chains.

The Last Adam, also given as the Final Adam or the Ultimate Adam, is a title given to Jesus in the New Testament. Similar titles that also refer to Jesus include Second Adam and New Adam.

Twice in the New Testament an explicit comparison is made between Jesus and Adam. In Romans 5:12–21, Paul observes that "just as through the disobedience of the one man the many were made sinners, so also through the obedience of the one man the many will be made righteous" (Romans 5:19, NIV). In 1 Corinthians 15:22, Paul writes that "as in Adam all die, so in Christ all will be made alive," while in verse 45 he calls Jesus the "last/ultimate/final Adam".

John Henry Newman used the phrase "Second Adam" in his hymn "Praise to the Holiest in the height", first appearing in The Dream of Gerontius:

O loving wisdom of our God!
When all was sin and shame,
A second Adam to the fight
And to the rescue came.

The title "New Adam" is emphasised in the recapitulation theory of atonement.

== The Pauline representation ==
Paul the Apostle contrasted Adam and Christ as two corporate personalities or representatives (Rom 5:12–21; 1 Cor. 15:20–3, 45–9) and saw human beings as bearing the image of both Adam and Christ (1 Cor. 15:49). Where Adam's disobedience meant sin and death for all, Christ's obedience more than made good the harm due to Adam by bringing righteousness and abundance of grace (Rom 5:12–21). (Note: Dunn 1989, p. 115 assembles evidence to show how not only Rom 5 but also Rom 1–8 interpret the human condition, at least partly, in the light of the creation and fall narratives of Genesis.) As a "life-giving spirit", the last Adam is risen from the dead and will transform us through resurrection into a heavenly, spiritual existence (1 Cor. 15:22, 45, 48–9). Thus Paul's Adam Christology involved both the earthly Jesus' obedience (Rom. 5) and the risen Christ's role as giver of the Spirit (1 Cor. 15). (Note: An explicit Adam Christology seems to have been introduced by Paul himself — first in 1 Cor 15 and then in Rom 5, (Fitzmyer 1993, pp. 136, 406, 412))

The same symbol, used to express Christ as the corporate, representative personality (and Adam as his foreshadow or "type", per Rom. 5:14), was taken up to express Christ's being: he is "the last Adam" (1 Cor. 15:45), or the "second man from heaven", and one not made "from earth, of dust" (1 Cor. 15:47; see Gen. 2:7). Some scholars detect an Adamic reference in several other New Testament passages: for example, in the language about "the glory of Christ, who is the image (Gr.:eikōn) of God" (2 Cor. 4:4). Perhaps this is an echo of the language of Genesis 1:26–7 about Adam being created in the divine image. If so, Paul would be thinking here of Christ as the ideal Adam, with his humanity perfectly expressing the divine image. But this exegesis is not fully convincing. (Note: As the divine eikōn or image (2 Cor. 4:4), Christ reveals God. The "glory" which becomes visible on the face of Christ is his own glory or, equivalently, "the glory of God" (2 Cor. 4:6).(Fitzmyer 1981, pp. 630–644)(Harris 2005, pp. 330–331)) One may likewise be less than fully convinced by those who find a reference to Adam in two hymnic or at least poetic passages: Colossians 1:15–20 and Philippians 2:6–11.

Colossians 1:15 In Colossians 1:15, Christ is called "the image (eikōn) of the invisible God, the first-born of all creation". In isolation, this verse could be taken merely in an Adamic sense as referring to Christ as the first created being, the archetypal human being who visibly reflects God, the invisible Creator. However, the context suggests finding the background in personified wisdom, the perfect image of God (Wisdom 7:26) and the agent of creation (Prov 8:22–31). The verses which follow speak of "all things" being "created through him and for him", of his being "before all things", of "all things holding together" in him, and of the plenitude of deity dwelling in him (Colossians 1:16–17,19). Any parallelism with Adam, who was simply made in the divine image and likeness, gets left behind here. (Note: For comments on the hymn, see Barth & Blanke 1994, pp. 193–251 and Wright 1991, pp. 99–119) On the contrary, every created thing, including the angelic "thrones, dominions, principalities, and authorities" (Col 1:16), is said to have originated through Christ (as creative agent) and for Christ (as final goal), who likewise is the principle of cohesion in holding the universe together. Further, it strains plausibility to argue that a mere Adamic model does justice to the language of "the fullness of God" dwelling in Christ (Col 1:19–20; cf. Col 2:9).

The context of Colossians 1:15, therefore, prompts one to interpret "the image of the invisible God" as pointing to Christ being on the divine side and being the perfect revealer of God — a thought paralleled by John 1:18 and 2 Corinthians 4:4. Like the hymn or poem in Colossians, Hebrews also portrays Christ as the exact (divine) counterpart through whom the Father speaks and is revealed, and who is the one that sustains the entire universe: "He reflects the glory of God and bears the very stamp of his nature, upholding the universe by his word of power" (Heb 1:3).

The whole context of Colossians 1:15–20 suggests a more than Adamic and human interpretation of "the first-born of all creation". Christ is the "first-born" in the sense of being prior to and supreme over all creation, just as by virtue of his resurrection from the dead he is supreme vis-à-vis the Church (Col 1:18). The emphatic and repeated "kai autos" (Gr. for "and he") of Colossians 1:17,18 underline the absolute "pre-eminence" of Christ in the orders of creation and salvation history; he is pre-eminent both cosmologically and soteriologically. He through whom the universe was created is the same Christ who formed the Church by rising from the dead. He has been active in both creation and redemption. (Note: The context is decisive for interpreting the nature of the genitive in Colossians 1:15 ("of all creation"). The 1989 Revised English Bible catches clearly the comparative force of the genitive: "his is the primacy over all creation". The "firstborn from the dead" (Col 1:18) is also the "firstborn over all creation" (Col 1:15).)

=== Philippians 2 ===
Scholars such as Oscar Cullmann and James D.G. Dunn suggest the author of the "Christ hymn" in Philippians 2:5-11 may be drawing a parallel between Adam and Jesus. Cullmann notes the parallel between "form of God" in Phil. 2:5 and "image of God" in Genesis 1:26, "The expression morphe (form) firmly establishes the connection between Jesus and the creation story of Adam... this Greek word corresponds to the Hebrew 'image' of Genesis 1:26... morphe in Phil. 2:6 is immediately related to the concept eikon (image) since the Semitic root word or its synonym can correspond to either of the two Greek words. This means that v. 6 does not refer to Jesus' divine 'nature' but rather to the image of God which he possessed from the beginning."

According to this interpretation, the first Adam was made in the "image of God" (Genesis 1:26) but sinned by trying to grasp equality with God (Genesis 3:5). In contrast, Jesus, also made in the image of God (Phil. 2:5) did not try to grasp equality with God, but instead, humbled himself in obedience to God. Dunn sees the Philippians 2 hymn as an archetypal parallel to the Genesis account of creation and fall, in which Jesus through obedience reverses the curse originally brought upon the world by Adam's sin: "The Philippians hymn is an attempt to read the life and work of Christ through the grid of Adam theology... the hymn is the epochal significance of the Christ-event, as determinative for humankind as the 'event' of Adam's creation and fall... Christ by his life, death, and resurrection has so completely reversed the catastrophe of Adam, has done so by the acceptance of death by choice rather than as punishment, as has thus completed the role of dominion over all things originally intended for Adam... It was Adam who was 'in the form of God'... the language was used... to bring out that Adamic character of Christ's life, death, and resurrection. So archetypal was Jesus' work in its effect that it can be described in language appropriate to archetypal man and as a reversal of the archetypal sin."

The Adamic interpretation of Philippians 2 stands in tension with the hymn's apparent affirmation of Christ as pre-existent deity before his incarnation. Scholars remain divided over the extent to which the hymn actually affirms the deity of the pre-existent Christ. The issue largely hinges on the meaning of the Greek words morphe ("form") and harpagmon ("to grasp"). While J.B. Lightfoot and others understand morphe in the Aristotelian sense of "essential nature", others such as Robert B. Strimple and Paul D. Feinberg have questioned whether a first century Jewish author would have had Aristotelian philosophy in mind, preferring instead the plainer translation of the word morphe as simply "appearance". In this view, the text does not state that Jesus is God, but merely that he had the appearance of a god (v. 6) but was revealed to be a man (v. 8). Strimple writes, "For years I tried to maintain the view of Lightfoot that Paul here uses morphe with the sense it had acquired in Greek philosophy, particularly Aristotelian... But I have had to conclude that there is really very little evidence to support the conclusion that Paul uses morphe in such a philosophical sense here." Likewise, Feinberg cautions, "the attractiveness of the Greek philosophical interpretation of morphe is that it gives the theologian about as strong an affirmation of the deity of Christ as is possible... One must, however, be careful that he does not read his theological convictions into the text when they are not there."

The Greek word harpagmon translated in Philippians 2:6 ("Something to be grasped after / exploited") is also a subject of much scholarly debate. If harpagmon is rendered as "something to be exploited," as it is in many Christian Bible translations, then the implication is that Christ was already equal to God prior to his incarnation. But Bart Ehrman and others have argued that the correct translation is in fact "something to be grasped after," implying that the pre-existent Jesus was not equal to God. A study of harpagmon in other New Testament texts supports Ehrman's view, as the word is almost always used to refer to something that a person doesn't yet possess but tries to acquire.

Scholars remain divided on whether the text affirms Christ's equality with God, nevertheless both sides acknowledge a possible Adamic parallel in Philippians 2. In one interpretation, Christ was in the "form of God" enjoying full equality with God, but refusing to use it for his own advantage or exploit for himself. The text thus contrasts Christ's humility (in becoming human and dying the death of a slave) with the presumptuous aspiration of Adam (and Eve) to enjoy illegitimate equality with God and become "like God" (Gen 3:5–6). (Note: On Phil 2:6–11, see Dunn 1989, pp. 113–121. Against Dunn, Wright 1991, pp. 99–119 convincingly shows that finding elements of an Adam-Christology in the hymn in no ways means following Dunn by squeezing everything into a purely Adamic pattern and ruling out a Christology of pre-existence and incarnation. For a thorough account of the exegetical and theological issues, see Capizzi 1997) In another interpretation, Christ was merely in the "appearance of a god" or the "image of God" in the Adamic sense, that is, not equal with God in substance. Adam sinned by trying to make himself equal with God, but Christ humbled himself in obedience to God, even to the point of death on a cross. Thus, the contrast between Adam's self-serving ambition and Christ's self-sacrificial humility is drawn.

== The Johannine representation ==
According to Makowiecki, Jesus performs a series of five redemptive actions in John 18-19 which methodically reverse Adam's five fallen actions in Genesis 3. He writes, "Jesus retraces the steps and corrects the missteps of Adam, but from the opposite direction: Adam departed the garden, Jesus enters the garden; Adam hid, Jesus comes forward; Adam blamed the companion God had given him, Jesus has the companions God has given him spared; Adam, who was naked, clothed himself with an apron of sewn fig leaves, Jesus, who was clothed with an unsewn tunic, is stripped naked; Adam ate the fruit in disobedience, Jesus drinks the sour wine in obedience." Makowiecki also claims that, in addition to recapitulating Adam's life, Jesus recapitulates his death as well.

== Post-New Testament symbolism ==
Whether one accepts the wider circle of references to Adam or limits oneself to the clear references in Romans 5 and 1 Corinthians 15, the New Testament used Adamic language to express the being of Jesus and, even more, his task and goal. In post-New Testament times, the symbol of Adam proved a valuable foil for Clement of Alexandria, Origen (d. c.254), St Athanasius of Alexandria (c.296–373), St Hilary of Poitiers (c.315–367), St Gregory of Nazianzus (329–389), St Gregory of Nyssa (c.330–395), and other Church Fathers, when they presented and interpreted the person and work of Christ. St Irenaeus (c.130–200), in particular, did much to elaborate further Paul's antithetical parallelism between Adam and Christ, the latter reversing the failure of the first. In a typical passage of his Adversus haereses, he wrote:

The Son of God... was incarnate and made man; and then he summed up in himself the long line of the human race, procuring for us a comprehensive salvation, that we might recover in Christ Jesus what in Adam we had lost, namely the state of being in the image and likeness of God" (3. 18. 1)

== Islam ==
The Quran directly compares Jesus to Adam in terms of how he came into existence. Sura Al-Imran says, "Verily, the likeness of Jesus before Allah is the likeness of Adam. He created him from dust, then He said to him: 'Be!' – and he was."

== See also ==
- Adam Kadmon
- Logos (Christianity)
- Paul the Apostle
- Old Testament and Adam
- Federal headship
- Names and titles of Jesus in the New Testament
