= Exergasia =

Rhetorical device

Exergasia (from the Greek εξ, ex, "out" and εργον, ergon, "work") is a form of parallelism where one idea is repeated and only the way it is stated is changed. In Latin, exergasia is known as expolitio.

== History ==
This device of parallelism was first identified by the twelfth-century Jewish scholars Abraham Ibn Ezra and Joseph Kimhi, who referred to it as "kefel 'inyan be-millot shonot" ("doubling of the thought with other words"). The term was next identified by Christian Schoettgen, who wrote "De Exergasia Sacra" ("From sacred exergasia") in 1733. The Bishop Robert Lowth identified specific types of parallelism and further defined the concept in the late eighteenth century.

== Definition ==
Exergasia is used to make a point or bring home a powerful idea. Repetition is a good way of making a point, but without the restatement of the idea it tends to become boring. As such, it is used by many great writers and orators. Martin Luther King Jr., in his 1963 "I Have a Dream" speech, says:

Now is the time to make real the promises of democracy;
now is the time to rise from the dark and desolate valley of segregation to the sunlit path of racial justice;
now is the time to lift our nation from the quicksands of racial injustice to the solid rock of brotherhood;
now is the time to make justice a reality for all God’s children.

The idea of correcting injustice is repeated in all four lines to emphasize this idea.

Shakespeare also utilizes exergasia. In The Winter's Tale, the character Florizel says

I take thy hand, this hand
As soft as dove's down, and as white as it,
Or Ethiopian's tooth, or the fanned snow that's bolted
By th' northern blasts twice o'er (IV.iv.360-363).

Florizel calls the hand white in three different ways: comparing it to dove's down, an Ethiopian's tooth, and snow.

=== Music ===
In the sense of music, the concept of exergasia (referred to as expolitio) is used to mean much the same thing as it does in literature. John Irving, in his 1998 book Mozart: The "Haydn" Quartets, calls expolitio "dwelling on the same topic and yet seeming to say something ever new" (Irving 67).
