= Epanadiplosis =

Figure of speech

Zoopraxiscope by British photographer Eadweard Muybridge. Drawn Ruade of a Donkey (1879). The epanadiplosis suggests an effect of repetition.

Epanadiplosis (from Ancient Greek ἐπαναδίπλωσις/epanadíplôsis, from ἐπί/epí, "on", ἀνά/aná, "again", and διπλόος/diplóos, "double", "doubling in succession") is a figure of speech in which the same word is used at the end of a clause as at the beginning of a preceding clause. The opposite figure is anadiplosis. It allows for melodic and rhythmic interplay to suggest emphasis or humor. Epanadiplosis can also be used to emphasize a word, a group of words, or an idea.

Epanadiplosis is also a narrative figure used in many literary genres, which is called "narrative epanadiplosis". It'is the repetition of an initial scene or motif (in the incipit) at the plot's end (or clausule). It suggests that the narrative is closed in on itself.

== Nature and limits of the figure ==
Epanadiplosis is a figure of repetition affecting syntactic position (the order of words in the sentence). For César Chesneau Dumarsais, the figure appears "when, of two correlative propositions, one begins and the other ends with the same word", or when, according to Henri Suhamy, only two propositions are involved.

He cites Tacitus as an example:

"Principes pro victoria pugnant, comites pro principe (Leaders fight for victory, companions for their leader)".

More specifically, epanadiplosis is the repetition at the end of a sentence of a word or even a locution located at the beginning of a proposition. The figure therefore concerns the phrasal level, unlike narrative epanadiplosis, which concerns an entire text. It constitutes a linguistic mechanism that is the opposite of anadiplosis, and can be summarized as follows, according to Patrick Bacry:

A _______ / _______ A

As in these verses by François de Malherbe:

[...] But she was of the world, where the most beautiful things

have the worst fate,

And rose she lived what roses live

In the space of a morning. [...]

For Jean-Jacques Robrieux, epanadiplosis is a figure close to chiasmus, as in this line by Victor Hugo, in which the indefinite pronoun "rien" is repeated symmetrically at the beginning and end of the proposition:

"Rien ne me verra plus, je ne verrai plus rien"

For Nicole Ricalens-Pourchot, epanadiplosis is signaled by the use of "two juxtaposed propositions, separated by a comma or semicolon'; it is, therefore, as Georges Molinié notes, a 'microstructural figure", as it only affects the limits of the sentence, and therefore only plays on both elocution and construction. It is, moreover, a very rare figure.

=== Limits of the figure ===
==== Combination with other figures ====
Epanadiplosis is sometimes confused with epanalepsis, in which the same word or group of words is repeated within the same sentence:

"Le temps s'en va, le temps s'en va, ma Dame". - Pierre de Ronsard, Sonnet à Marie

However, these two figures, as well as that of anadiplosis, are often used in conjunction, as in this excerpt from Eugène Ionesco's Rhinocéros (act i):

"Yes, I have strength, I have strength for several reasons. First I have strength because I have strength, then I have strength because I have moral strength. I also have strength because I'm not an alcoholic."

Epanadiplosis is also often used in combination with epistrophe, as in:

"You in the corner are sure. You're certain, that's for sure."

The whole allows for melodic and stylistic effects, since in the symphony the words or groups of words beginning a phrase and those ending it are repeated at the beginning and end of the following words. Epanadiplosis is combined, so that there is "an interweaving of repetitions".

=== Anaplodiplosis ===
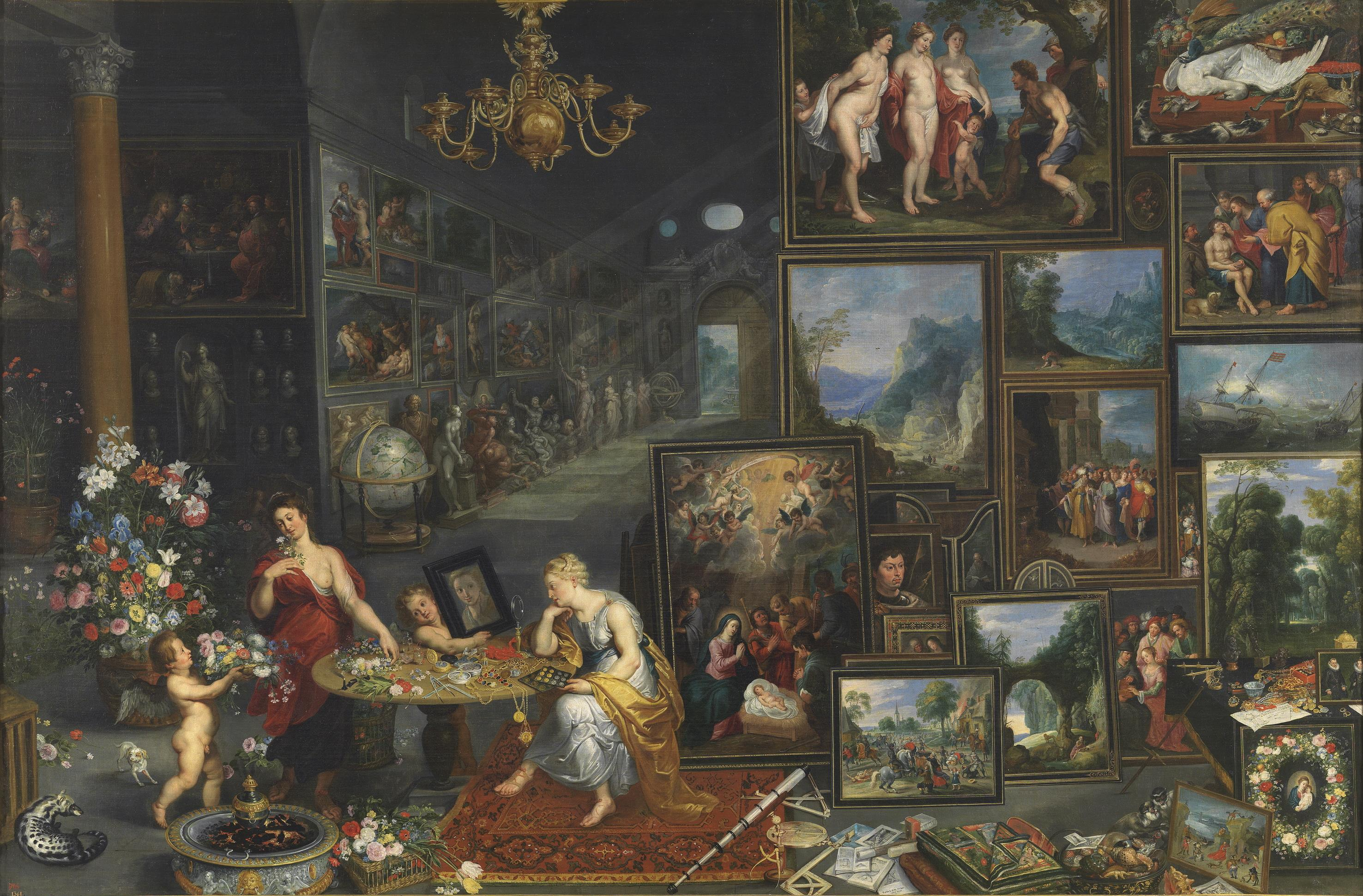
Jan Brueghel the Elder, Allegory of Sight and Smell (1618).

Narrative epanadiplosis, or "anaplodiplosis" (anadiplosis in Latin), from the Greek ἀνάπλωσις ("explanation") and διπλόη ("anything doubled, or divided in two") is a figure of speech that consists in completing a work, usually a novel, as one has begun it. It consists of repeating, at the very end of a work, the initial motif, event, or configuration described in the incipit. Anaplodiplosis is a way of "coming full circle". At the end of the novel (or film), the reader or viewer encounters an identical or similar situation to that of the incipit, giving the work a certain depth. This cyclical conclusion is frequently found in short stories.

This process is akin to mise en abyme, frequently used in literature. It's common in film and literature, especially in the fantasy genre. It gives narrative coherence to the work as a whole, and above all creates an impression of cycle, of eternal return. In a way, the story recounts the motif of natural cycles, such as the return of the seasons or the succession of generations. For the author, this may be an ironic way of saying that we're back where we started, and that everything that has happened in the meantime is of little importance. Or it may simply be an aesthetic device aimed at creating a kind of symmetry, a regular ordering of the work.

== Stylistic use ==
In visual rhetoric, epanadiplosis can be used for comic purposes or to capture the imagination:

"Too much tax kills tax

The looping effect of the figure creates the impression of a paradox and a closed maxim, as in Hobbes' example: "Man is a wolf to man", where the initial argument is taken up as the final argument. In logic and rhetoric, the figure is often used in syllogisms. César Chesneau Dumarsais, in his Traité des tropes, discusses and defines it as: "There is another figure [of words] called epanadiplosis, which occurs when, of two correlative propositions, one begins and the other ends with the same word", as in:

"Man can cure everything, not man." - Georges Bernanos, Nous autres Français

The figure can also border on tautology:

"I am as I am". - Jacques Prévert, Paroles

According to Bernard Dupriez, the purpose of epanadiplosis is often to underline, or even reiterate, as in:

"Childhood knows what it wants. It wants to get out of childhood. - Jean Cocteau, La Difficulté d'être

Some instances of epanadiplosis, however, are the result of the randomness of everyday language, without any particular stylistic research:

"An immobile donkey on a median strip, like a statue of a donkey." - Gilbert Cesbron, Journal sans date

A final effect may be that of parallelism. According to Georges Molinié and Michèle Aquien, epanadiplosis often coordinates two propositions (in the sense of logical and semantic units) in the same sentence, which constitute repetition, by suggesting a parallel construction. They cite this example from La Bruyère:

"...for this people seems to adore the prince, and the prince adores God".

The two sentence members that follow the conjugated verb "appears" are coordinated with each other in a strictly parallel structure: "the last word of the first member and the first word of the second member are the same" (this is the nominal group "the prince"). The epanadiplosis is doubled by an antimetabole in this example (for the verbal element: "adore le prince").

== Genres covered ==
=== Poetry ===
Epanadiplosis between the first and last lines is a frequent feature of poems. In Les Regrets, Joachim du Bellay forms a palindromic epanadiplosis:

If you want to live in court, Dilliers, remember
To always accost your master's cuties,
If you're not a favorite, pretend you are,
And to accommodate yourself to the king's pastimes.
Remember not to lend your faith
To every man's talk: but above all, be adextre,
To help with the left as well as the dexter
And by the morals of others to your morals give law.
Advance nothing of yours, Dilliers, but your service,
Nor show that thou art too much an enemy to vice,
And be often mute, blind, and deaf.
Do not let thy name be called for others.
Doing as I say, thou wilt be a gentleman:
Remember this, Dilliers, if you want to live in court.

Guillaume Apollinaire, for his part, uses the resources of epanadiplosis to make the cycle of the seasons tangible, closing the poem on itself in a single suggestive image:

The meadow is poisonous but pretty in autumn
The cows grazing there
Slowly poisoning themselves
The colic colored of the ring and lilac
Your eyes are like that flower
Violet like their halo and like this autumn
And my life for your eyes is slowly poisoned
Schoolchildren come clattering in
Dressed in hiccups and playing the harmonica
They pick the colchicums that are like mothers
Daughters of their daughters and the color of your eyelids
Fluttering like flowers in the mad wind
The herdsman sings softly
While slow and mooing the cows abandon
For ever this great meadow ill-flowered by autumn

=== Novel ===
The incipit and epilogue of Émile Zola's novel Germinal form an epanadiplosis: the same character walks alone along the same road. On the first page, he arrives on a cold night in a mining country: "A single idea occupied the empty head of a worker without work and lodging, the hope that the cold would be less intense after daybreak ', and on the last page, he leaves Montsou, but in the sunshine, and hope: 'Penetrated by this hope, Étienne slows his walk, his eyes lost to the right and the left, in the gaiety of the new season. "

Many novels use anaplodiplosis. These include Bernadin de Saint-Pierre's Paul et Virginie (1788), Raymond Queneau's Le Chiendent (1933), James Joyce's Finnegans Wake (1939), Paulo Coelho's The Alchemist (1988), Anton Chekhov's The Wood Demon (play) (1889), Eugène Ionesco's The Bald Soprano (1950) and Stephen King's The Dark Tower (1982 to 2004).

In Primo Levi's stories and essays (La tregua, I sommersi e i salvati), admittedly far removed from novels, narrative epanadiplosis seals the author's radical pessimism: "What has been can happen again", so everything is always to be started again.

=== Film and audiovisual ===
- P.R.O.F.S. opens with a student asking the question "What is epanadiplosis? The answer doesn't come until the end of the film, in a scene in which Laurent Gamelon exclaims "That's epanadiplosis.", standing next to a horse. Most of Patrick Schulmann's films form an epanadiplosis.
- Forrest Gump begins and ends with a shot of a feather twirling in the wind.
- La Vie d'Adèle begins with the heroine leaving her home as a teenager, walking down the street to catch her bus, and ends with Adèle leaving an exhibition as an adult, walking down the street to return home from the same angle.
- Ma place au soleil begins and ends with shots of a cyclist riding through Paris.
- Lean On: in the video clip for this song by Major Lazer with DJ Snake and MØ, directed by Tim Erem, the first and last scenes of the clip are an ascending and descending view of the rose window on the ceiling of the palace bedroom.
- Roman Polanski's films make frequent use of epanadiplosis (or rather, anaplodiplosis) to ensure narrative coherence: in The Fearless Vampire Killers, the sleigh-racing scene inverts the fight against the vampires into the vampires' contaminating victory; the concert scene in Death and the Maiden or The Pianist measures the gap between two seemingly similar scenes, but fundamentally different in the narrative of warlike violence that separates them.
- Ridley Scott's Alien Covenant opens and closes with the same piece of music by Wagner.
- The film 1917 opens and closes, some 24 hours apart, with the same character dozing against a tree.
- The first episode of The Middle series opens with an illustration of a plane flying over the state of Indiana, and a steward inviting his passengers to look out of the windows. The same plane appears in the final seconds of the last episode of the final season.
- The film Knives Out opens and closes with a shot of a mug bearing the words "My house, my rules, my coffee".
- At the start of Marcel Pagnol's film Topaze, the honest schoolteacher Topaze is giving dictation to a child who has remained in the classroom. Glancing at the pupil's copy, Topaze sees mistakes and wants to help him spell the word moutons correctly: "c'est-à-dire qu'il n'y avait pas qu'un moutonne, il y avait plusieurs moutonssses". At the end of the film, Topaze, now a swindler, glances at the notes his mistress has just taken about their projects in Morocco - marble quarries, phosphates, olive trees, sheep - and replies: "c'est-à-dire qu'il n'y a pas qu'un moutonne, il y a plusieurs moutonssses".

=== Music ===
For Anne Quesemand, epanadiplosis is a resource for melodic effects in nursery rhymes, as in Alouette:

"Alouette, gentil alouette! Alouette je te plumerai...".

=== Comic strip ===
In the album Bouge tranquille, from the Génie des alpages series, by F'murr, in the story "Homéotéleute, Tragédie en cinq actes de monsieur Corneille", Épanadiplose is Homéotéleute's sister and expresses herself only in epanadiploses.

In Moebius and Jodorowsky's L'incal series, the story begins and ends with the fall of hero John Difool into the well of Suicide Alley.

== See also ==
Mother figure	Daughter figure	
Anaphora (rhetoric)	Anaplodiplose	
Antonym	Paronym	Synonym
	Anadiplosis	Chiasmus Epanalepsis

== Bibliography ==
- Bacry, Patrick (1992). Les Figures de style et autres procédés stylistiques, coll. « Collection Sujets ». Paris: Armand Colin. ISBN 2-7011-1393-8.
- Dupriez, Bernard (2003). Gradus, les procédés littéraires coll. « Domaine français » (10 ed.). Paris: Union générale d'édition. ISBN 978-2-264-03709-1.
- Quesemand, Anne (2005). Elles sont tropes ! : Figures et tournures de la langue française. Illustrated by Laurent Berman. Paris: Éditions Alternatives. ISBN 2-86227-464-X.
- Robrieux, Jean-Jacques (2004). Les Figures de style et de rhétorique coll. « Les topos ». Paris: Dunod. ISBN 2-10-003560-6.
- Ricalens-Pourchot, Nicole (2003). Dictionnaire des figures de style coll. « Lettres ». Paris: Armand Colin. ISBN 978-2-200-26457-4.
- Suhamy, Henri (2004). Les Figures de style coll. « Que sais-je ? »). Paris: Presses universitaires de France. ISBN 2-13-044604-3.
- Aquien, Michèle; Molinié, Georges (1999). Dictionnaire de rhétorique et de poétique coll. « La Pochothèque ». Paris: LGF. ISBN 2-253-13017-6.
- Robrieux, Jean-Jacques (1993). Éléments de rhétorique et d'argumentation. Paris: Dunod. ISBN 2-10-001480-3.
