= Anadiplosis =

Type of linguistic repetition

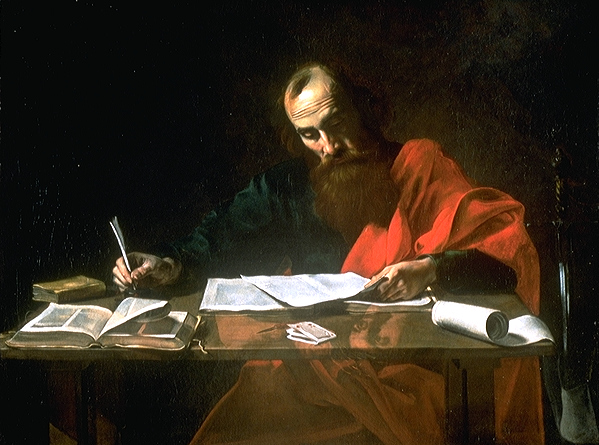
Paul the Apostle, depicted in the painting above by Valentin de Boulogne, was the author of the Epistle to the Romans which contains the anadiplotic verse "... we rejoice in our sufferings, knowing that suffering produces endurance, endurance produces character, and character produces hope, and hope does not disappoint us."

Anadiplosis (/ænədɪˈploʊsɪs/ AN-ə-di-PLOH-sis; Greek: ἀναδίπλωσις, anadíplōsis, "a doubling, folding up") is the repetition of the last word of a preceding clause. The word is used at the end of a sentence and then used again at the beginning of the next sentence, often to create climax. It is also sometimes referred to as reduplicatio or the redouble.

== Etymology ==
Anadiplosis comes directly from Latin anadiplosis which comes from Greek anadiplosis (Greek: ἀναδίπλωσις; convolution; revolution, duplication) which is derived from anadiploesthai (to double back; to make double) from ana- (Greek: ἀνα-; back) and diploun (Greek: διπλόος; to double; to fold over).

== Rhetorical use ==
The device used successively can create a chain of logic; for example, the following phrase connects the initial neutral phrase ("ideas") to the more august idea of destiny: "Ideas shape actions. Actions shape character. Character shapes destiny." This can serve to reinforce the underlying argument. These anadiploses can provide the "illusion of logic," as said by Mark Forsyth; the structure's connectivity of individual points and subsequent doubling-down of them increases its strength; the device, therefore, may be used to falsely confirm an argument (e.g. in a fallacy of four terms). Consecutive emphatic anadiploses are sometimes referred to by concatenation (first coined by Nicolas Beauzée); they are also sometimes called linked anadiploses.

Anadiplosis can also give a sense of harmony, rhythm, and momentum between clauses or ideas as well as. For example, Milton's phrase in Lycidas, "For Lycidas is dead, dead ere his prime," connects the two clauses with a shared word: dead. This can additionally be seen in colloquially conversation, in which anadiplosis may be used to link one's reply with another; thus, in Ulysses, Joyce writes: "To Stephen, who has described the soul as a 'simple substance,' Bloom replies: 'Simple? I shouldn't think that is the proper word.'"

Anadiplosis may be used to emphasize the repeated word or phrase as well as build overall emotional intensity to create climax. For example, in the below example from Romans 5:3–5:

More than that, we rejoice in our sufferings, knowing that suffering produces endurance,
endurance produces character, and character produces hope,
and hope does not disappoint us, because God's love has been poured into our hearts through the Holy Spirit which has been given to us

Paul progressively increases the perceived importance of each element (suffering less important than endurance which less important than hope ending with the most important thing to Paul: God) building to the final climax.

== Examples ==
- "For your brother and my sister no sooner met but they looked; no sooner looked but they loved; no sooner loved but they sighed; no sooner sighed but they asked one another the reason; no sooner knew the reason but they sought the remedy; and in these degrees have they made a pair of stairs to marriage" — Shakespeare, As You Like It, act 5, scene 2
- "Mine be thy love, and thy love's use their treasure." —Shakespeare, Sonnet 20
- "The years to come seemed waste of breath, / A waste of breath the years behind" — William Butler Yeats, "An Irish Airman Foresees His Death"
- "Queeg: 'Aboard my ship, excellent performance is standard. Standard performance is sub-standard. Sub-standard performance is not permitted to exist.'" — Herman Wouk, The Caine Mutiny
- "What I present here is what I remember of the letter, and what I remember of the letter I remember verbatim (including that awful French)." — Vladimir Nabokov, Lolita
- "Having power makes [totalitarian leadership] isolated; isolation breeds insecurity; insecurity breeds suspicion and fear; suspicion and fear breed violence." —Zbigniew Brzezinski, The Permanent Purge: Politics in Soviet Totalitarianism
- "I love her! Isn't that a wonder? / I wonder why I didn't want her? / I want her! that's the thing that matters! / And matters are improving daily!" — Sheldon Harnick, "She Loves Me"
- "... how it was that people had lived in this place and in this place had died." — Cormac McCarthy, Blood Meridian
- "Fear leads to anger. Anger leads to hate. Hate leads to suffering. I sense much fear in you." Yoda - Star Wars: Episode I – The Phantom Menace
- Noust in the grass / grass in the wind / wind on the lark / lark for the sun / Sun through the sea / sea in the heart / heart in its noust / nothing is lost — John Glenday, "Noust"
- "Hard times create strong men. Strong men create good times. Good times create weak men. And weak men create hard times." — G. Michael Hopf, Those Who Remain
- "Turn the lights out now / Now I'll take you by the hand / Hand you another drink / Drink it if you can / Can you spend a little time? / Time is slipping away / Away from us so stay / Stay with me I can make / Make you glad you came" — The Wanted, "Glad You Came"
- "Any dog under fifty pounds is a cat, and cats are pointless." - Ron Swanson - Parks and Recreation
- "Our very strength incites challenge. Challenge incites conflict. And conflict breeds catastrophe." - Vision in Captain America: Civil War

== See also ==
- Antati, a form of Tamil poetry that relies upon anadiplosis
- Antimetabole
- Epistrophe
- Epanalepsis
- Figure of speech
