= William Shakespeare's collaborations =

Like most playwrights of his period, William Shakespeare did not always write alone. A number of his surviving plays are collaborative, or were revised by others after their original composition, although the exact number is open to debate. Some of the following attributions, such as The Two Noble Kinsmen, have well-attested contemporary documentation; others, such as Titus Andronicus, are dependent on linguistic analysis by modern scholars; recent work on computer analysis of textual style (word use, word and phrase patterns) has given reason to believe that parts of some of the plays ascribed to Shakespeare are actually by other writers.

In some cases the identity of the collaborator is known; in other cases there is a scholarly consensus; in others it is unknown or disputed. These debates are the province of Shakespeare attribution studies. Most collaborations occurred at the very beginning and the very end of Shakespeare's career.

== Elizabethan authorship ==
The Elizabethan theatre was nothing like the modern theatre, but rather more like the modern film industry. Scripts were often written quickly, older scripts were revised and many were the product of collaboration. The unscrupulous nature of the Elizabethan book printing trade complicates the attribution of plays further; for example, William Jaggard, who published the First Folio, also published The Passionate Pilgrim by W. Shakespeare, which is mostly the work of other writers.

== Shakespeare's collaborations ==
=== Early works ===
- Edward III was published anonymously in 1596. It was first attributed to Shakespeare in a bookseller's catalogue published in 1656. Various scholars have suggested Shakespeare's possible authorship, since a number of passages appear to bear his stamp, among other sections that are remarkably uninspired. In 1996, Yale University Press became the first major publisher to produce an edition of the play under Shakespeare's name. A consensus is emerging that the play was written by a team of dramatists including Shakespeare early in his career – but exactly who wrote what is still open to debate. The play is included in the Second Edition of the Complete Oxford Shakespeare (2005), where it is attributed to "William Shakespeare and Others", and in the Riverside Shakespeare. In 2009, Brian Vickers published the results of a computer analysis using a program designed to detect plagiarism, which suggests that 40% of the play was written by Shakespeare with the other scenes written by Thomas Kyd (1558–1594).
- Henry VI, Part 1: possibly the work of a team of playwrights, whose identities are unknown. Some scholars argue that Shakespeare wrote less than 20% of the text. Gary Taylor argues that the first act was the work of Thomas Nashe. Paul J. Vincent concludes that, in light of recent research into the Elizabethan theatre, 1 Henry VI is Shakespeare's partial revision of a play by Nashe (Act 1) and an unknown playwright (Acts 2–5), the original of which was performed in early 1592. Shakespeare's work in the play, which was most likely composed in 1594, can be found in Act 2 (scene 4) and Act 4 (scenes 2–5 and the first 32 lines of scene 7). Vincent's authorship findings, especially with regard to Nashe's authorship of Act 1, are supported overall by Brian Vickers, who agrees with the theory of co-authorship and differs only slightly over the extent of Shakespeare's contribution to the play, tentatively identifying Thomas Kyd as the author of the rest of the play.
- Titus Andronicus: seen as a collaboration with, or revision of, George Peele. See Authorship of Titus Andronicus.
- Sir Thomas More: some pages of the manuscript of this play are in Shakespeare's handwriting, with the assembled text being a collaboration with Anthony Munday (the primary author) and others.
- The Spanish Tragedy: although definitely known to be by Thomas Kyd, Thomas Pavier's edition of 1602 added five new passages to the preexisting text, totaling 320 lines, with the most substantial addition being an entire scene, known as the "painter scene", since it is dominated by Hieronimo's conversation with a painter. Even before Pavier's quarto, however, the scene seems to have been in existence and known to audiences, since John Marston parodies the painter scene in his 1599 play Antonio and Mellida. The five additions in the 1602 text may have been made for the 1597 revival by the Admiral's Men. In 2013, scholar Douglas Bruster, after comparing spellings in the additions with what we know of Shakespeare's handwriting, concluded that Shakespeare did indeed write the additions. Bruster attributed mistakes in the text of the additions to the illegibility of Shakespeare's handwriting; the resulting mistakes have led to the devaluing of the portions that Shakespeare presumably wrote.

=== Collaboration with Wilkins ===
- Pericles, Prince of Tyre: includes the work of George Wilkins. Most scholars take the view that Wilkins wrote the first two acts, and Shakespeare the last three.

=== Collaborations with Middleton ===
- Macbeth: Thomas Middleton may have adapted Shakespeare's tragedy by introducing act 3 scene 5 – featuring Hecate and the three witches, and a song which also features in Middleton's The Witch – and the Hecate passages in act 4 scene 1.
- Measure for Measure: may have undergone a light revision by Middleton at some point after its original composition. As with Macbeth, the only source is that of the First Folio.
- Timon of Athens: may result from collaboration between Shakespeare and Middleton which might explain its incoherent plot and unusually cynical tone.
- All's Well That Ends Well: research published in 2012 by Emma Smith and Laurie Maguire of Oxford University suggests a collaboration between Shakespeare and Middleton.

=== Collaborations with Fletcher ===
- Cardenio, a lost play; contemporary reports say that Shakespeare collaborated on it with John Fletcher.
- Henry VIII: generally considered a collaboration between Shakespeare and Fletcher.
- The Two Noble Kinsmen, published in quarto in 1634 and attributed to John Fletcher and William Shakespeare on the title page; each playwright appears to have written about half of the text. It is excluded from the First Folio.

== See also ==
- Shakespeare apocrypha
