= In Soviet Russia =

Form of joke

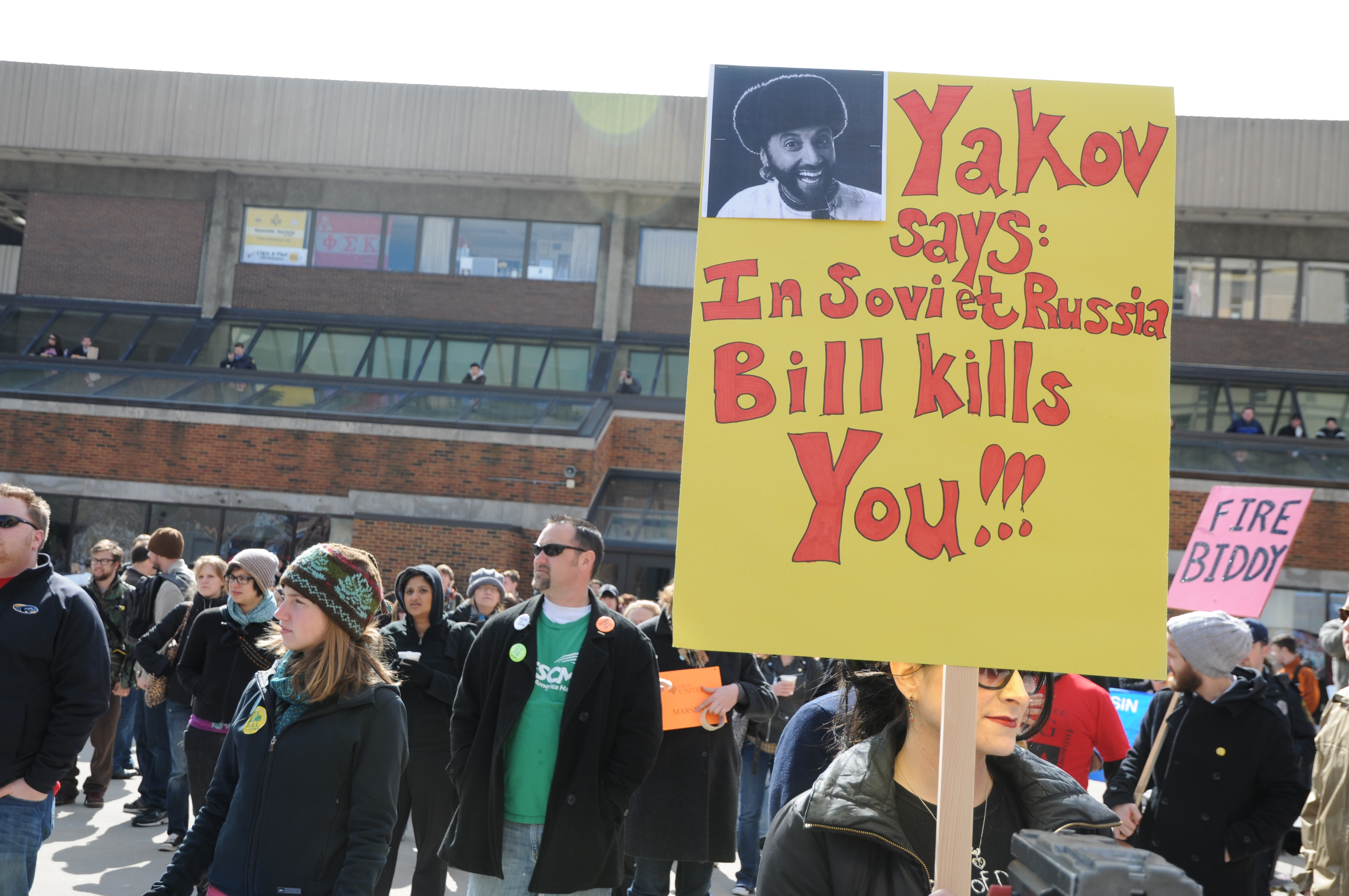
The joke on a placard at a 2011 demonstration in Wisconsin

"In Soviet Russia", also called the Russian reversal, is a joke template taking the general form "In America you do X; in Soviet Russia X does you". Typically the American clause describes a harmless ordinary activity and the inverted Soviet form something menacing or dysfunctional, satirizing life under communist rule, or in the "old country". Sometimes the first clause is omitted.

Although the exact origin of the joke form is uncertain, an early example is from the 1938 Cole Porter musical Leave It to Me!, with book by Bella and Samuel Spewack ("In Soviet Russia, messenger tips you."). Bob Hope used the form at the 1958 Academy Awards. In the 1968–1973 television show Laugh-In, a recurring character, "Piotr Rosmenko the Eastern European Man" (played by Arte Johnson), delivered short jokes such as "Here in America, is very good, everyone watch television. In old country, television watch you!" This joke alludes to "telescreens" from George Orwell's dystopian novel Nineteen Eighty-Four, which both reproduce images and monitor the citizenry.

The joke form is often associated with the Soviet emigrant comedian Yakov Smirnoff, who used it, for example, in a 1985 Miller Lite commercial: "In America, there's plenty of light beer and you can always find a party. In Russia, Party always finds you". Another example is by Garry Kasparov: "Every country has its own mafia; In Russia, the mafia has its own country."

== See also ==
- Antimetabole
- Russian political jokes
