= Symploce =

Figure of speech using repetition

In rhetoric, symploce is a figure of speech in which a word or phrase is used successively at the beginning of two or more clauses or sentences and another word or phrase with a similar wording is used successively at the end of them. It is the combination of anaphora and epistrophe. It derives from the Greek word, meaning "interweaving".

== Examples ==
- "When there is talk of hatred, let us stand up and talk against it. When there is talk of violence, let us stand up and talk against it." — US President Bill Clinton
- "Let England have its navigation and fleet—let Scotland have its navigation and fleet—let Wales have its navigation and fleet—let Ireland have its navigation and fleet—let those four of the constituent parts of the British empire be under four independent governments, and it is easy to perceive how soon they would each dwindle into comparative insignificance." — The Federalist No. 4
- The statement and poem "First They Came" by Martin Niemöller
- "Ain't no mountain high enough; ain't no valley low enough; ain't no river wide enough" - Ain't No Mountain High Enough

== See also ==
- Antimetabole
