= Antithetic parallelism =

Rhetorical device

Antithetic parallelism is a form of parallelism where the meaning of two or more excerpts of text are observed, although directly linked by providing the same meaning from differing perspectives. This type of parallelism is used in order to create repetition of meaning as a technique for cognitive reinforcement, thus more effectively communicating the meaning of the text.

== Examples ==
Examples of antithetic parallelism are found in Hebrew poetry, especially in Psalms of the Bible:

The young lions lack and suffer hunger;
But those who seek the LORD shall not lack any good thing. (Psalms 34:10)

More specifically, antithetical parallelism is defined as text where the meaning in the first part of the couplet contrasts with an opposite theme contained in the second part (see above). The use of opposites clarifies both extremes. In poetry the use of opposites can bring a sharper contrast to an image and provide a greater focus to the desired message. It is often marked by the use of the conjunction ‘but’, placed between two statements to juxtapose them and helps the reader or to view both the positive and negative perspectives of the text.

Antithetic parallelism is not to be confused with 'synonymous' or 'synthetic' parallelism, which reflect repeated and expansive ideas respectively.

== See also ==
- Parallelism (rhetoric)
- Rhetorical device
