= Hereward Thimbleby Price =

Malagasy-born English author and professor (1880–1964)

Hereward Thimbleby Price (23 April 1880 – 11 May 1964) was an English author and professor of English at the University of Michigan.

Price was born 23 April 1880 in the town of Ambatolahinandrianisiahana, Madagascar as a son of Mary Anne "Polly" Thimbleby and Charles Thomas Price (1847-1933), an English missionary. Returning to England, he was educated at various private schools, and in 1899 matriculated at the University of Oxford. During this time he also worked as an assistant in the creation of the Oxford English Dictionary. In 1904 he was appointed lecturer in English at the University of Bonn, where he wrote and published his thesis A history of ablaut in the strong verbs from Caxton to the end of the Elizabethan period (1910). In 1911, while living in Germany, Price married and became naturalized as a German citizen. Subsequently, he was drafted into the German army during World War I. He was captured by Russian soldiers, but escaped to China. In 1919 he wrote a book about his experiences called Boche and Bolshevik: Experiences of an Englishman in the German Army and in Russian Prisons.

After coming to America and gaining a professorship at the University of Michigan, he wrote many other books, including Foreign influences on Middle English, and Construction in Shakespeare. Price died in Washington, D.C., on 11 May 1964, age 84. He is buried in Forest Hill Cemetery, Ann Arbor, Michigan.
