= Enantiosis =

Rhetorical device of juxtaposition of opposites for contrast

The yin yang symbol which illustrates opposites together.

Enantiosis, synoeciosis or discordia concors is a rhetorical device in which opposites are juxtaposed so that the contrast between them is striking. Examples include the famous maxim of Augustus, festina lente (hasten slowly), and the following passage from Paul's second letter to the Corinthians:

By honour and dishonour, by evil report and good report: as deceivers, and yet true;
As unknown, and yet well known; as dying, and, behold, we live; as chastened, and not killed;
As sorrowful, yet alway rejoicing; as poor, yet making many rich; as having nothing, and yet possessing all things.

Dr. Johnson in his Lives of the Poets (1779) defined discordia concors as "a combination of dissimilar images, or discovery of occult resemblances in things apparently unlike. (...) The most heterogeneous ideas are yoked by violence together."

== See also ==
- antithesis
- irony
- oxymoron
- paradox
