= Antimetabole =

Literary device

In rhetoric, antimetabole (/æntɪməˈtæbəliː/ AN-ti-mə-TAB-ə-lee) is the repetition of words in successive clauses, but in transposed order; for example, "I know what I like, and I like what I know". It is related to, and sometimes considered a special case of, chiasmus.

An antimetabole can be predictive, because it is easy to reverse the terms. It may trigger deeper reflection than merely stating one half of the line.

== Etymology ==
It is derived from the Greek ἀντιμεταβολή (antimetabolḗ), from ἀντί (antí, 'against, opposite') and μεταβολή (metabolḗ, 'turning about, change').

== Examples ==
=== Proverbs ===
- "Unus pro omnibus, omnes pro uno" ("One for all, all for one")
- "Eat to live, do not live to eat." (Often attributed incorrectly to Socrates.)
- "When the going gets tough, the tough get going."
- “If you fail to plan, you plan to fail.” (Often misattributed to Benjamin Franklin.)

=== Literature ===
- "Fair is foul, and foul is fair" — William Shakespeare, Macbeth
- "The Sabbath was made for man, not man for the Sabbath." —Mark 2:27
- "All crime is vulgar, just as all vulgarity is crime" — Oscar Wilde, The Picture of Dorian Gray
- "He was just the man for such a place, and it was just the place for such a man." — Frederick Douglass, Narrative of the Life of Frederick Douglass
- "Are you the strongest because you're Satoru Gojo? Or are you Satoru Gojo because you're the strongest?" — Suguru Geto, Jujutsu Kaisen
- "Because I could not stop for Death, he kindly stopped for me" — Emily Dickinson, "Because I Could Not Stop for Death"
- "I meant what I said, and I said what I meant. An elephant's faithful, one hundred percent!" — Dr. Seuss, Horton Hatches the Egg

=== Literary criticism ===
- "The great object of [Hamlet's] life is defeated by continually resolving to do, yet doing nothing but resolve." — Samuel Taylor Coleridge on William Shakespeare's Hamlet

=== Politics ===
- "Ask not what your country can do for you; ask what you can do for your country." — John F. Kennedy, 1961 inaugural address
- "And we'll lead, not merely by the example of our power, but by the power of our example." — Vinay Reddy, author of Joe Biden's 2021 inaugural address
- "There is no 'way to peace'. Peace is the way." — A. J. Muste

=== Music ===
- "She's got everything it takes, to take everything you've got." — Loretta Lynn, "Everything It Takes"
- "With my mind on my money and my money on my mind." — Snoop Dogg, "Gin and Juice"
- "I'm hoping that somebody pray for me, I'm praying that somebody hope for me." — JID, "Enemy"
- "We run things, things don't run we [sic]" — Miley Cyrus, "We Can't Stop"

=== Television ===
- "Too crazy for Boystown, too much of a boy for Crazytown." — Dr Hibbert, "The Simpsons"

=== Comedy ===
- "In America, you can always find a party. In Soviet Russia, Party always finds you!" — Yakov Smirnoff

== See also ==
- Anadiplosis
- Figure of speech
- In Soviet Russia
- Symploce
