= Anaphora (rhetoric) =

Repeating the same phrase before each clause for emphasis

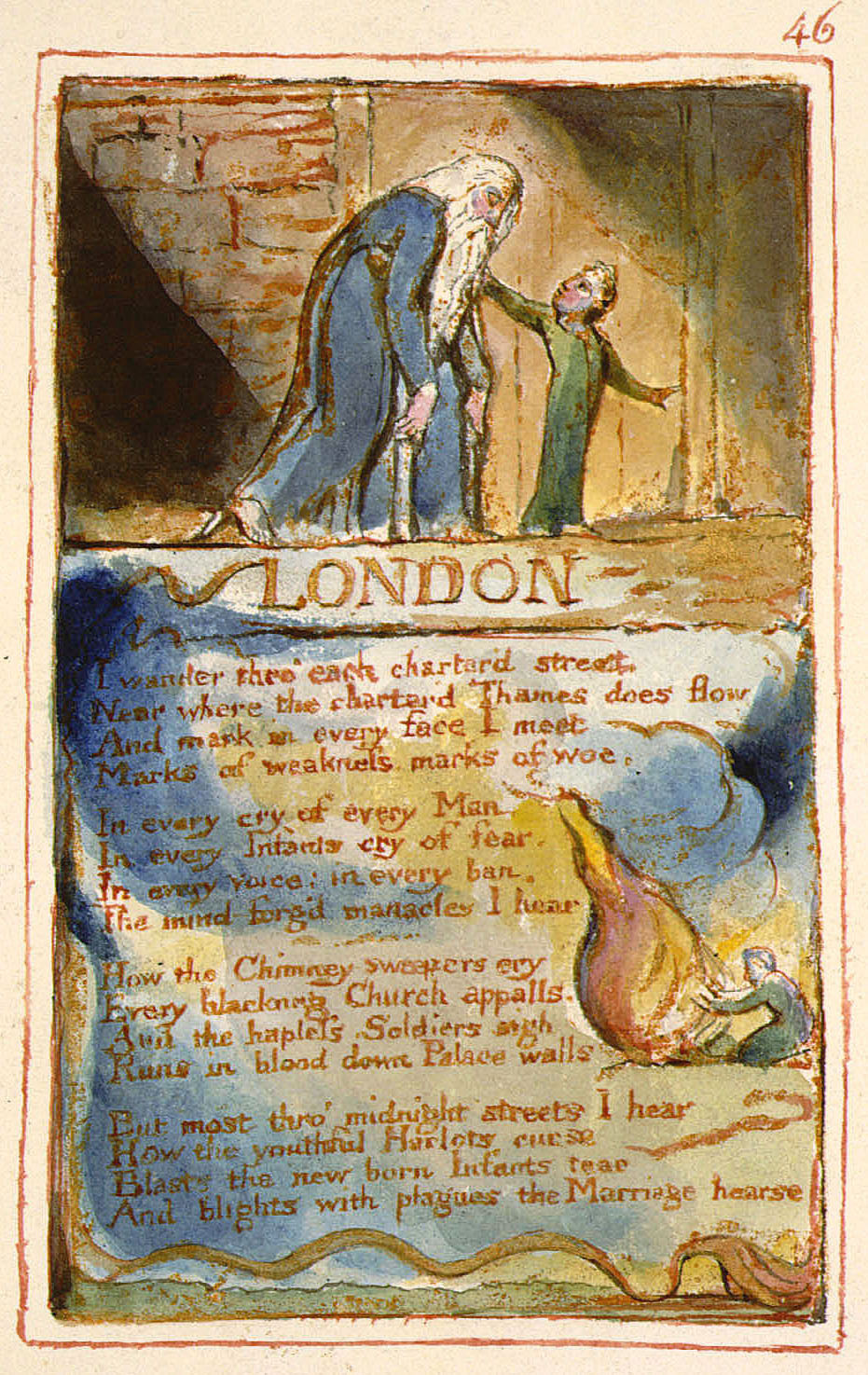
The second stanza of William Blake's London represents an example of anaphora. This image is a digital reproduction of his hand-painted 1826 print from Copy AA of Songs of Innocence and Experience. The item is currently in the collection of the Fitzwilliam Museum.

In rhetoric, an anaphora (Greek: ἀναφορά, "carrying back") is a rhetorical device that consists of repeating a sequence of words at the beginnings of neighboring clauses, thereby lending them emphasis. In contrast, an epistrophe (or epiphora) is repeating words at the clauses' ends. The combination of anaphora and epistrophe results in symploce.

== Functions ==
Anaphora is repetition at the beginning of a sentence to create emphasis. Other than the function of emphasizing ideas, the use of anaphora as a rhetorical device adds rhythm to a word as well as making it more pleasurable to read and easier to remember.

Anaphora serves the purpose of delivering an artistic effect to a passage. It is also used to appeal to the emotions of the audience in order to persuade, inspire, motivate and encourage them. In Dr. Martin Luther King Jr.'s famous "I Have a Dream" speech, he uses anaphora by repeating "I have a dream" eight times throughout the speech.

== Example ==
We shall not flag or fail. We shall go on to the end. We shall fight in France, we shall fight on the seas and oceans, we shall fight with growing confidence and growing strength in the air, we shall defend our island, whatever the cost may be, we shall fight on the beaches, we shall fight on the landing grounds, we shall fight in the fields and in the streets, we shall fight in the hills. We shall never surrender.

— Winston Churchill, "We shall fight on the beaches"

== See also ==
- Epistrophe
- Epanalepsis
- Figures of speech involving repetition
- Ubi sunt
