= Epistrophe =

Emphasis technique

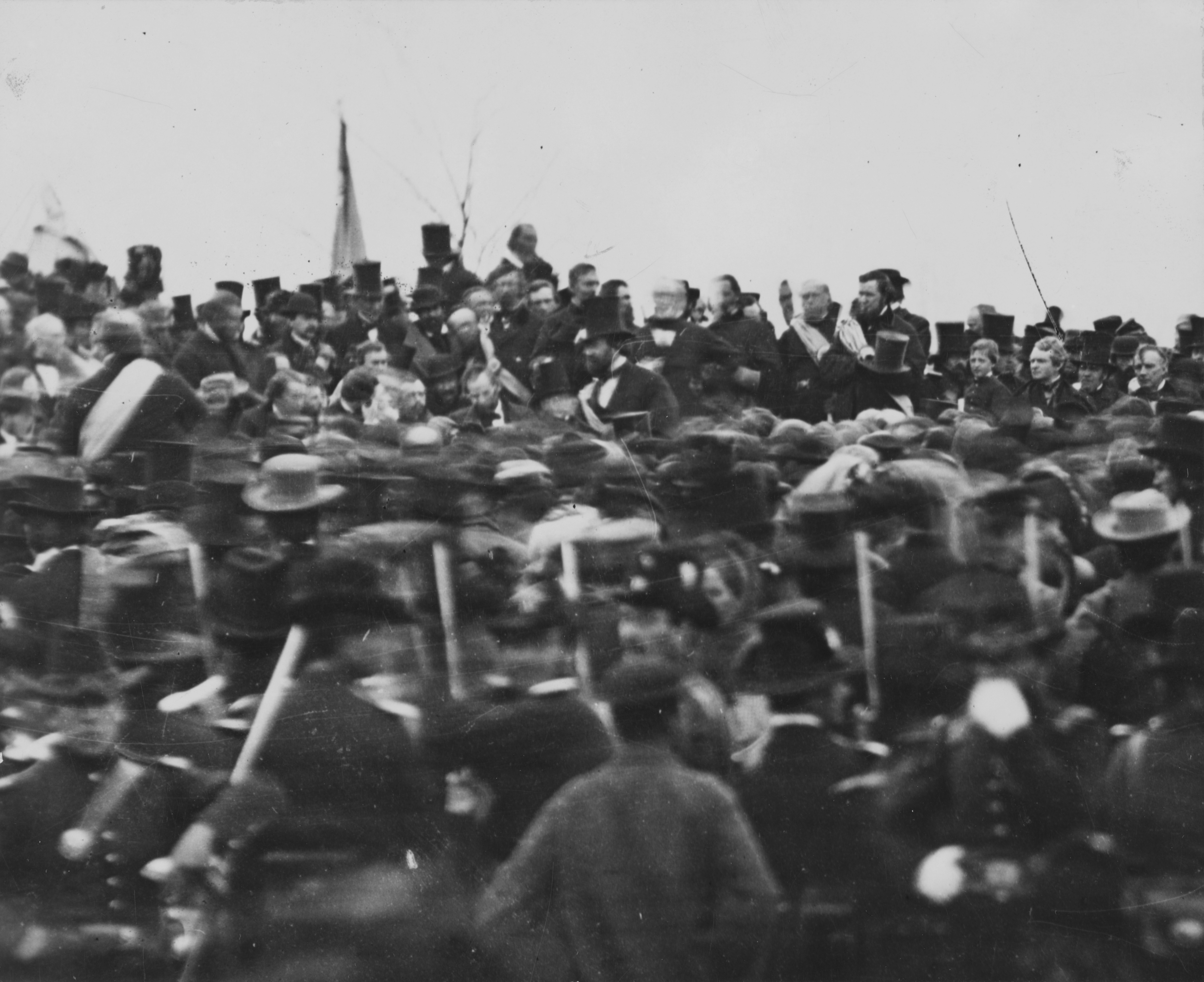
Photo of the Gettysburg Address where Abraham Lincoln where he used epistrophe when he said "... and that government of the people, by the people, for the people, shall not perish from the earth."

Epistrophe (Greek: ἐπιστροφή, "return") is the repetition of the same word or words at the end of successive phrases, clauses, or sentences. It is also known as epiphora, antistrophe, or conversio. It is a figure of speech and the counterpart of anaphora. It is an extremely emphatic device because of the emphasis placed on the last word in a phrase or sentence.

== Etymology ==
Epistrophe comes from Late Latin epistrophe derives from the Greek epistrepho (Greek: ἐπιστροφή; "a turning upon") from epi- (Greek: ἐπι-; "upon") and strepho (Greek: στρέφω; "to turn").

== Rhetorical use ==
Epistrophe involves the repetition of the same phrase at the end of successive clauses. The device is often used to develop rhythm and momentum. While used in poetry, epistrophe is a staple feature of the periodic style.

Epistrophe emphasizes the repeated phrase via both repetition and placing it at the end of a clause, often giving a sense of urgency or providing emotional weight. The trope often emphasizes the inability to escape a certain trend; a "trope of obsession," as Forsyth refers to it. Therefore, epistrophe is often suitable to encapsulate themes focused on inevitability such as obsessive love or death.

George Puttenham's definition of an epistrophe (which he calls antistrophe or "counter turn") refers to the repetition of a phrase in the same position (not necessarily at the end) and similar context. He provides the following example with the repetition of love:

She shunnes my loue, and after by a traine
She seekes my loue, and faith she loues me most,
But seing her loue, so lightly wonne and lost:
I longd not for her loue, for well I thought,
Firme is the loue, if it be as it ought.

Other definitions provided to epistrophe may include being made synonymous with anaphora, conduplicatio, or paronomasia. Greek epistrophe is a word coined by Plato as a goal of philosophical education; it was later adopted by early Christians as a word for conversion.

== Examples ==
- "Wherever there's a fight so hungry people can eat, I'll be there. Wherever there's a cop beating up a guy, I'll be there. I'll be in the way guys yell when they're mad— I'll be in the way kids laugh when they're hungry and they know supper's ready. And when our folks eat the stuff they raise and live in the houses they build— why, I'll be there" — John Steinback, The Grapes of Wrath (note the use of anaphora with "I'll be in" as well as the lengthened delay between the second and third "I'll be there"
- "Where affections bear rule, their reason is subdued, honesty is subdued, good will is subdued, and all things else that withstand evil, for ever are subdued." — Thomas Wilson
- "... this nation, under God, shall have a new birth of freedom—and that government of the people, by the people, for the people, shall not perish from the earth." — Abraham Lincoln in the Gettysburg Address
- "When I was a child, I spoke as a child, I understood as a child, I thought as a child; but when I became a man, I put away childish things." — The Apostle Paul, in the Bible, 1 Cor 13:11 (King James Translation)
- "There is no Negro problem. There is no Southern problem. There is no Northern problem. There is only an American problem." Lyndon B. Johnson in "We Shall Overcome"
- "What lies behind us and what lies before us are tiny compared to what lies within us." — Ralph Waldo Emerson
- "Hourly joys be still upon you!
  Juno sings her blessings on you. ...
  Scarcity and want shall shun you,
  Ceres' blessing so is on you."

— Shakespeare, The Tempest (4.1.108–109; 116–17)

- It was a creed written into the founding documents that declared the destiny of a nation.
  Yes we can.
  It was whispered by slaves and abolitionists as they blazed a trail towards freedom through the darkest of nights.
  Yes we can.
  It was sung by immigrants as they struck out from distant shores and pioneers who pushed westward against an unforgiving wilderness.
  Yes we can.
  It was the call of workers who organized; women who reached for the ballot; a President who chose the moon as our new frontier; and a King who took us to the mountaintop and pointed the way to the Promised Land. Yes we can to justice and equality. Yes we can to opportunity and prosperity. Yes we can heal this nation. Yes we can repair this world. Yes we can.

In the beginning of this quotation by Barack Obama epistrophe is evoked, while the latter part makes use of anaphora.

== See also ==
- Anaphora
- Antimetabole
- Anthimeria
- Figure of speech
- Epistrophy (composition), a jazz standard composed by Thelonious Monk and Kenny Clarke in 1941
