= Golden line =

Type of Latin dactylic hexameter

The golden line is a type of Latin dactylic hexameter frequently mentioned in Latin classrooms and in contemporary scholarship about Latin poetry, but which apparently began as a verse-composition exercise in schools in early modern Britain.

== Definition ==
The golden line is variously defined, but most uses of the term conform to the oldest known definition from Burles' Latin grammar of 1652:

"If the Verse does consist of two Adjectives, two Substantives and a Verb only, the first Adjective agreeing with the first Substantive, the second with the second, and the Verb placed in the midst, it is called a Golden Verse: as,

Lurida terribiles miscent aconita novercae. (Ovid, Metamorphoses 1.147)
Pendula flaventem pingebat bractea crinem."

These lines have the abVAB structure, in which two adjectives are placed at the beginning of the line and two nouns at the end in an interlocking order.

Lurida terribiles miscent aconita novercae.
adjective a, adjective b, VERB, noun A, noun B (abVAB)
"fearsome stepmothers mix ghastly aconites"

Pendula is an adjective modifying bractea and flaventem is an adjective modifying crinem.

Pendula flaventem pingebat bractea crinem.
"hanging gold leaf was colouring her yellow hair"

Another would be Virgil, Aeneid 4.139:

Aurea purpuream subnectit fibula vestem,
"a golden clasp fastens her purple cloak"

Word-by-word the line translates as "golden purple fastens clasp cloak". The endings on the Latin words indicate their syntactical relationship, whereas English uses word order to do the same task. So a Latin listener or reader would know that golden and clasp go together even though the words are separated.

The term "golden line" and its form originated in Britain, where it was an exercise for composing Latin verses. The first known use, as aureus versus, is by the Welsh epigrammatist John Owen in a footnote to his own Latin poem in 1612. The definition quoted above is in an obscure Latin textbook published in England in 1652, which never sold well and of which only four copies are extant today. It appeared in about a dozen citations between 1612 and 1900, including in some American and British Latin Grammars in the 19th and early 20th century. Scholars outside the English-speaking world have only mentioned the golden line since 1955. It is not found in any current handbooks on Latin grammar or metrics except for Mahoney's online Overview of Latin Syntax and Panhuis's Latin Grammar.

The term "golden line" did not exist in Classical antiquity. Classical poets probably did not strive to produce them (but see the teres versus in the history section below). S. E. Winbolt, the most thorough commentator on the golden line, described the form as a natural combination of obvious tendencies in Latin hexameter, such as the preference for putting adjectives towards the beginning of the line and nouns at the emphatic end. The golden line is an extreme form of hyperbaton.

There are about ten different definitions of the "golden line". Often scholars do not explicitly offer a definition, but instead present statistics or lists of golden lines, from which one must extrapolate their criteria for deeming a verse golden.

=== The so-called "silver line" ===
Although Burles's 1652 definition (see the introduction above) is explicit about the abVAB structure, many scholars also consider lines with this chiastic pattern to be "golden":

Humanum miseris volvunt erroribus aevum (Prudentius, Hamartigenia 377)
adjective a, adjective b, VERB, noun B, noun A (abVBA)
"they involve the human race with wretched errors"

Perhaps this more inclusive definition is based upon the famous definition offered by the poet John Dryden in his introduction to the Silvae, "That Verse commonly which they call golden, or two Substantives and two Adjectives with a Verb betwixt them to keep the peace." Wilkinson offered the humorous definition "silver line" for this variant. Wilkinson also offered another humorous distinction, the "bronze line", but this term has rarely been used since.

=== Criteria for inclusion and exclusion ===
Different scholars use different definitions of a golden line. Most scholars exclude the less common variants in which one or both nouns precede the verb, gold (aBVAb, AbVaB, ABVab) and silver (aBVbA, AbVBa, ABVba). Some scholars include lines with extra prepositions, adverbs, exclamations, conjunctions, and relative pronouns. For example, Orchard does not offer a definition of the golden line, but his criteria can be extracted from his list of the golden lines in Aldhelm's Carmen de virginitate. He allows relative pronouns (2, 4, 112, 221, 288), prepositions (278, 289), conjunctions like ut and dum (95, 149, 164, 260), exclamations (45), and adverbs (14). He also allows extra adjectives, as in "Haec suprema". He includes silver lines (4, 123, 260). He disqualifies inverted or mixed order, where nouns come first (101, 133, 206, 236, 275, 298). He allows participles as the verb in the middle (71, 182), but he does not include the periphrastic verbal form in 271: Atque futurorum gestura est turma nepotum.

== Use by classical poets ==
Statistics illuminate some long-term trends in the use of the golden line. The following statistical tables are based on one scholar's definitions of golden and "silver" lines (the tables are from Mayer (2002) with additions of Juvenal, Calpurnius, and Nemesianus from Heikkinen). Table 1 gives the totals for the golden and silver lines in classical poetry, listed in approximate chronological order from Catullus to Statius. Table 2 gives similar figures for a few poets in late antiquity, while Table 3 gives figures for a selection of early medieval poems from the fifth to tenth centuries.

In all three tables, the first column is the total number of verses in the work in question, followed by the number of "golden lines" and "silver lines" in the work. The last three columns give the percentage of golden and silver lines in respect to the total number of verses. Aside from a few exceptions, only poems with more than 200 lines are included, since in shorter poems the percentage figures are arbitrary and can be quite high. See, for example, the combined percentage of 14.29 in the Apocolocyntosis. Other short poems that are not included on the tables, such as the Copa, Moretum, Lydia, and Einsiedeln Eclogues, have rather high combined percentages between 3.45 and 5.26.

Table 1 Golden and Silver Lines in Classical Poetry

| Poem | Total Verses | Golden | Silver | % Golden | % Silver | % Gold & Silver |
|---|---|---|---|---|---|---|
| Catullus 64 | 408 | 18 | 10 | 4.41 | 2.45 | 6.86 |
| Horace, Satires & Epistles | 3981 | 14 | 4 | 0.35 | 0.10 | 0.45 |
| Virgil, Eclogues | 829 | 15 | 7 | 1.81 | 0.84 | 2.65 |
| Virgil Georgic 2 | 542 | 11 | 5 | 2.03 | 0.92 | 2.95 |
| Virgil Georgic 4 | 566 | 5 | 2 | 0.88 | 0.35 | 1.24 |
| Virgil Aeneid | 9896 | 34 | 26 | 0.34 | 0.26 | 0.61 |
| Culex | 414 | 18 | 5 | 4.35 | 1.21 | 5.56 |
| Ciris | 541 | 27 | 12 | 4.99 | 2.22 | 7.21 |
| Ovid, Metamorphoses | 11989 | 126 | 28 | 1.05 | 0.23 | 1.28 |
| Lucan | 8060 | 118 | 51 | 1.46 | 0.63 | 2.10 |
| Laus Pisonis | 261 | 16 | 4 | 6.13 | 1.53 | 7.66 |
| Persius | 650 | 6 | 6 | 0.92 | 0.92 | 1.85 |
| Ilias Latina | 1070 | 20 | 8 | 1.87 | .75 | 2.62 |
| Apocolocyntosis Divi Claudi | 49 | 6 | 1 | 12.24 | 2.04 | 14.29 |
| Statius, Thebais 1 | 720 | 5 | 3 | .69 | .42 | 1.11 |
| Statius, Thebais 2 | 743 | 8 | 4 | 1.08 | .54 | 1.62 |
| Statius, Thebais 3 | 721 | 2 | 1 | .28 | .14 | .42 |
| Juvenal, Satires 1-5 | 990 | 14 | 1 | 1.41 | .20 | 1.61 |
| Calpurnius, Eclogue 1 | 94 | 8 | 1 | 8.51 | 1.06 | 9.57 |
| Calpurnius, Eclogue 2 | 100 | 8 | 3 | 8.00 | 3.00 | 11.00 |
| Calpurnius, Eclogue 3 | 98 | 3 | 0 | 3.06 | 0 | 3.06 |
| Calpurnius, Eclogue 4 | 169 | 7 | 0 | 4.14 | 0 | 4.14 |
| Calpurnius, Eclogue 5 | 120 | 5 | 1 | 4.17 | .83 | 5.00 |
| Calpurnius, Eclogue 6 | 92 | 2 | 0 | 2.17 | 0 | 2.17 |
| Calpurnius, Eclogue 7 | 84 | 4 | 0 | 4.76 | 0 | 4.76 |
| Calpurnius, Eclogues TOTAL | 757 | 37 | 5 | 4.89 | .66 | 5.55 |

From Table 1 it appears that golden and silver lines occur in varying frequencies throughout the classical period, even within the corpus of a single author. There are no Latin golden or silver lines before Catullus, who uses them in poem 64 to an extent almost unparalleled in classical literature. Lucretius has a few examples. Horace has about 1 in every 300 lines, as does Virgil's Aeneid. Virgil's earlier works have a higher percentage. Ovid and Lucan use the golden line about once in every 100 lines. The high percentage of golden lines found in the Laus Pisonis and other works of the Neronian period has led some scholars to claim that the form is a mark of Neronian aesthetics. While several scholars have claimed that the golden line is mainly used to close periods and descriptions, the poems do not seem to bear this out.

Heikkinen makes the case that the golden line was a conscious feature of classical Latin pastoral poetry, as shown by the high percentages in Vergil's, Calpurnius's, and Nemesianus's Eclogues. However, statistics cannot prove that the golden line was a recognized form of classical poetics.

Table 2: Golden lines in selected late antique poetry

| Poem | Total Verses | Golden | Silver | % Golden | % Silver | % Gold & Silver |
|---|---|---|---|---|---|---|
| Nemesianus, Eclogue 1 | 87 | 1 | 0 | 1.15 | 0 | 1.15 |
| Nemesianus, Eclogue 2 | 90 | 2 | 0 | 2.22 | 0 | 2.22 |
| Nemesianus, Eclogue 3 | 69 | 2 | 2 | 2.90 | 2.90 | 5.80 |
| Nemesianus, Eclogue 4 | 73 | 2 | 1 | 2.74 | 1.37 | 4.11 |
| Nemesianus, Eclogues TOTAL | 319 | 7 | 3 | 2.19 | .94 | 3.13 |
| Prudentius, Apotheosis | 1084 | 8 | 5 | 0.74 | 0.46 | 1.20 |
| Prudentius, Hamartigenia | 966 | 11 | 3 | 1.14 | 0.31 | 1.45 |
| Prudentius, Psychomachia | 915 | 12 | 4 | 1.31 | 0.44 | 1.75 |
| Aegritudo Perdicae | 290 | 3 | 0 | 1.03 | 0.00 | 1.03 |
| Dracontius, De laudibus Dei 1 | 754 | 6 | 2 | .80 | .27 | 1.06 |
| Claudian, Panegyricus 1 | 279 | 10 | 3 | 3.58 | 1.08 | 4.66 |
| Claudian In Eutropium 1 | 513 | 5 | 8 | 0.97 | 1.56 | 2.53 |
| Claudian On Honorius's Third Consulship | 211 | 9 | 3 | 4.27 | 1.42 | 5.69 |
| Claudian On Honorius's Fourth Consulship | 656 | 10 | 5 | 1.52 | 0.76 | 2.29 |
| Ausonius, Mosella | 483 | 18 | 4 | 3.73 | 0.83 | 4.55 |

As Table 2 shows, in late antiquity the use of golden lines remains within the general range found in classical times. Of particular interest is their use by Claudian. On the average the golden line is found in every 50 lines of Claudian, but there are considerable differences between works. Table 2 gives his poem with the lowest percentage (On Honorius's Fourth Consulship) and that with the highest (On Honorius's Third Consulship).

Figurative poetry, such as that of Publilius Optatianus Porfyrius and, in Carolingian times, that of Hrabanus Maurus, rarely uses the golden line. These poets use a variety of hexameters praised by Diomedes: rhopalic verses, echo verses, and reciprocal verses. They use the golden line only once or twice, possibly because the form is rather elementary compared to their usual pyrotechnic displays.

== Use by medieval poets ==
Table 3: Golden lines in some early medieval poetry

| Poem | Total Verses | Golden | Silver | % Golden | % Silver | % Gold & Silver |
|---|---|---|---|---|---|---|
| Caelius Sedulius, Paschale 1 | 352 | 27 | 1 | 7.67 | 0.28 | 7.95 |
| Caelius Sedulius, Paschale 2 | 300 | 7 | 1 | 2.33 | 0.33 | 2.67 |
| Caelius Sedulius, Paschale 3 | 333 | 16 | 0 | 4.80 | 0.00 | 4.80 |
| Caelius Sedulius, Paschale 4 | 308 | 11 | 1 | 3.57 | 0.32 | 3.90 |
| Caelius Sedulius, Paschale 5 | 438 | 7 | 1 | 1.60 | 0.23 | 1.83 |
| Caelius Sedulius, Paschale, Total | 1731 | 68 | 4 | 3.93 | 0.23 | 4.16 |
| Corippus, Iohannis 1 | 581 | 31 | 0 | 5.34 | 0.00 | 5.34 |
| Corippus, Iohannis 2 | 488 | 11 | 2 | 2.25 | 0.41 | 2.66 |
| Corippus, Iohannis 3 | 460 | 7 | 2 | 1.52 | 0.43 | 1.96 |
| Corippus, Iohannis 4 | 644 | 16 | 0 | 2.48 | 0.00 | 2.48 |
| Corippus, Iohannis 5 | 527 | 18 | 3 | 3.42 | 0.57 | 3.98 |
| Corippus, Iohannis 6 | 773 | 10 | 3 | 1.29 | 0.39 | 1.68 |
| Corippus, Iohannis 7 | 543 | 17 | 2 | 3.13 | 0.37 | 3.50 |
| Corippus, Iohannis 8 | 650 | 5 | 0 | 0.77 | 0.00 | 0.77 |
| Corippus, Iohannis, Total | 4666 | 115 | 12 | 2.46 | 0.26 | 2.72 |
| Corippus, In laudem preface. | 99 | 6 | 0 | 6.06 | 0.00 | 6.06 |
| Corippus, In laudem 1 | 367 | 12 | 0 | 3.27 | 0.00 | 3.27 |
| Corippus, In laudem 2 | 430 | 10 | 0 | 2.33 | 0.00 | 2.33 |
| Corippus, In laudem 3 | 407 | 19 | 0 | 4.67 | 0.00 | 4.67 |
| Corippus, In laudem 4 | 377 | 13 | 0 | 3.45 | 0.00 | 3.45 |
| Corippus, In laudem, Total | 1680 | 60 | 0 | 3.57 | 0.00 | 3.57 |
| Aldhelm, Carmen de virginitate | 2904 | 188 | 23 | 6.47 | 0.79 | 7.27 |
| Ennodius, Itinerarium | 52 | 6 | 0 | 11.54 | 0.00 | 11.54 |
| Ennodius, In Natale | 170 | 4 | 4 | 2.35 | 2.35 | 4.71 |
| Vita S. Erasmi | 450 | 0 | 1 | 0.00 | 0.22 | 0.22 |
| Vita S. Verenae | 132 | 0 | 0 | 0.00 | 0.00 | 0.00 |
| Passio S. Mauricii | 252 | 6 | 2 | 2.38 | 0.79 | 3.17 |
| Vita S. Clementis | 984 | 6 | 2 | 0.61 | 0.20 | 0.81 |
| Vita S. Ursmari 1 | 798 | 11 | 1 | 1.38 | 0.13 | 1.50 |
| Vita S. Ursmari 2 | 220 | 2 | 0 | 0.91 | 0.00 | 0.91 |
| Vita S. Landelini | 529 | 6 | 0 | 1.13 | 0.00 | 1.13 |
| Vita S. Bavonis 1 | 415 | 14 | 1 | 3.37 | 0.24 | 3.61 |
| Hisperica Famina | 612 | 144 | 1 | 23.53 | 0.16 | 23.69 |
| Walther de Speyer I | 235 | 16 | 1 | 6.81 | 0.43 | 7.23 |
| Walther de Speyer II | 251 | 18 | 2 | 7.17 | 0.80 | 7.97 |
| Walther de Speyer III | 254 | 14 | 2 | 5.51 | 0.79 | 6.30 |
| Walther de Speyer IV | 252 | 11 | 1 | 4.37 | 0.40 | 4.76 |

Table 3 reveals several interesting tendencies in golden line usage in the early medieval period. The fact that Caelius Sedulius, Aldhelm, and the Hisperica Famina have a pronounced preference for the form has long been noted. Corippus in the sixth century also uses the golden line significantly more than classical authors. Note that there is not a comparable increase in the silver line: If anything, these authors have fewer silver lines. This trend may be due to the growing fondness for leonine rhymes, which are facilitated by the golden line structure but not by the silver line. Another tendency, seen in Corippus, Sedulius, Aldhelm, and Walther de Speyer, is an extremely large number of golden lines in the beginning of a work, which is not matched in the rest of the work. Many scholars only tallied figures for the golden line at the beginnings of these poems, and therefore can have inflated numbers. In the first 500 lines of Aldhelm's Carmen de virginitate, for example, there are 42 golden lines and 7 silver lines, yielding percentages of 8.4 and 1.4 respectively; in the last 500 lines (2405-2904) there are only 20 golden lines and 4 silver lines, yielding percentages of 4 and 0.8 respectively—a reduction by half. Corippus's Ioannis and Sedulius's Paschale have even more extreme reductions. These skewed percentages may indicate that the golden line is an ideal that is artfully strived for but which cannot be continuously realized over the course of a long epic.

Another possible explanation for the diminished use of golden lines within an author's work (observed already in Virgil; see Table 1) is that, with time, poets may gradually free themselves from the constraints of the form. The golden line may have been taught in the schools as a quick way to elegance, which poets would use with increasing moderation as their experience grew. Two poems that appear to be juvenalia point to this conclusion. The Hisperica Famina is a bizarre text which is apparently from seventh-century Ireland. It seems to be a collection of school compositions on set themes that have been run together. Of its 612 lines, 144—23.53 percent—have the golden line structure. Most of the lines that are not "golden" are merely too short to have more than three words; or, occasionally, they are too long. These extremely short or long lines are due to the fact that the poem is not written in hexameter. It may be written in some rough stress-based meter, but even that cannot be stated with certainty. But the ideal model that the composers took for their verses appears to have been the golden line. Walther de Speyer composed his poem on the life of St. Christopher in 984 when he was seventeen. The percentage of golden lines is high, but the number of near-misses is enormous. When you read Walther you get the impression that he was programmed in school to write golden lines.

The large number of golden lines in poetry from the sixth through ninth centuries could reflect the combination of several trends, such as the preference for hyperbaton and the growing popularity of leonine rhymes. The statistics do not (and cannot) prove that the form was ever taught and practiced as a discrete form. Even if the golden line was not a conscious poetic conceit in the classical or medieval period, it might have some utility today as a term of analysis in discussing such poetry. However, the form now appears in canonical English commentaries to authors from Callimachus to Aldhelm and most scholars who refer to the golden line today treat it as an important poetic form of indisputable antiquity.

== History ==
The first person to mention the golden line may be the grammarian Diomedes Grammaticus, in a list of types of Latin hexameters in his Ars grammatica. This work was written before 500 CE, and it has been plausibly suggested that he wrote after 350 CE. Diomedes' chapter entitled "De pedibus metricis sive significationum industria" (Keil 498-500) describes the teres versus, which has been identified by del Castillo (p. 133) as the golden line:

Teretes sunt qui volubilem et cohaerentem continuant dictionem, ut

Torva Mimalloneis inflatur tibia bombis

Rounded verses are those that conjoin a fluent and contiguous phrase, such as

Torva Mimalloneis inflatur tibia bombis.

The example verse is a golden line. However, it is difficult to understand what "conjoin a fluent and contiguous phrase" ( volubilem et cohaerentem continuant dictionem) means and how exactly it applies to this verse. None of the other ancient metricians use the term teres versus or κυκλοτερεῖς (the Greek form that Diomedes mentions as its equivalent). The only other commentator to mention the teres versus was the Renaissance scholar Julius Caesar Scaliger (1484–1558), who did not seem to understand Diomedes. In his book Poetices Libri Septem (1964 Stuttgart facsimile reprint of the 1561 Lyon edition, p. 71-72, text in Mayer), Scaliger offers a muddled attempt at understanding Diomedes. He mentions that "Quintilian and others" mention this as a teres versus:

Mollia luteola pingens vaccinia calta (a mangled version of Virgil, Eclogue 2.50)

Our manuscripts of Quintilian do not include this verse of Virgil, but it is the first pure golden line in Virgil and it becomes the most famous golden line citation. Scaliger's use of this example is evidence that someone between Diomedes and him took the term teres versus to be similar to a modern golden line.

The English fascination with the golden line seems to trace back to Bede. Bede advocated a double hyperbaton, and also the placing of adjectives before nouns. In the examples from each criterion (double hyperbaton and adjectives before nouns) Bede includes at least one golden line, but from his other examples it is clear that he did not limit these injunctions to the golden line:

But the best and most beautiful arrangement [optima ... ac pulcherrima positio] of the dactylic verse is when the penultimate parts respond to the first ones and the last parts respond to the middle ones [primis penultima, ac mediis respondet extrema]. Sedulius was in the habit of using this arrangement often, as in

Pervia divisi patuerunt caerula ponti [Sedulius, Paschal. 1.136, a golden line]

and

Sicca peregrinas stupuerunt marmora plantas [Sedulius, Paschal. 1.140, another golden line]

and

Edidit humanas animal pecuale loquelas [Sedulius, Paschal. 1.162, not a golden line]

Bede's remarks in his De arte metrica were repeated and made more strict by Renaissance guides to versification, ultimately leading to Burles's description of the golden line. The earliest is the 1484 De arte metrificandi of Jacob Wimpfeling:

It will be a mark of extraordinary beauty and no mean glory will accrue when you have distanced an adjective from its substantive by means of intervening words, as if you were to say

pulcher prevalidis pugnabat tiro lacertis.

And two years later the Ars Versificandi of Conrad Celtes followed Wimpfeling:

Fifth precept: the most charming form of poem will be to have distanced an epithet from its substantive by means of intervening words, as if you were to say

maiores{que} cadunt altis de montibus umbre
pulcer prevalidis pugnabit tiro lacertis.

In 1512 Johannes Despauterius quoted Celtis's remarks verbatim in his Ars versificatoria in the section De componendis carminibus praecepta generalia and then more narrowly defined excellence in hexameters in the section De carmine elegiaco:

Elegiac poetry rejoices in two epithets, this is to say adjectives, (not swollen, or puffed-up, or affected adjectives). This is almost always done so that the two adjectives are placed in front of two substantives, so that the first responds to the first. Nonetheless, you will frequently find different types, for we are not imparting laws, but good style. Propertius, book 2:

Sic me nec solae poterunt avertere sylvae
Nec vaga muscosis flumina fusa iugis.

Nor is this inelegant in other genres of poetry, for examples

Sylvestrem tenui musam meditaris avena.

Care must be taken that the two words are not in the same case and number, because that leads to ambiguity. That is not the case when Virgil says

Mollia lutheola pingit vaccinia calta.

Moreover, there should not be two epithets [for one noun], because that is faulty according to Servius. An example would be:

dulcis frigida aqua.

Despauterius here combines Bede's two rules into one general precept of elegance: Two adjectives should be placed before two substantives, the first agreeing with the first. It is not quite the golden line, for there is no provision for a verb in the middle. However, Despauterius quotes the famous example of the golden line, Eclogue 2.50, as a good example of the type. This line is the first pure golden line in Virgil's works. It is also the example line given in Scaliger above. The same general remarks about epithets are found in John Clarke's 1633 Manu-ductio ad Artem Carmificam seu Dux Poeticus (345):

Epitheta, ante sua substantiva venustissime collocantur, ut :

Pendula flaventem pingebat bractea crinem
Aurea purpuream subnectit fibula vestem, [Aeneid 4.139]
Vecta est fraenato caerula pisce Thetis.

The source of Clarke's first example line is unknown, but the same line is also one of Burles's examples of the golden line. Burles's discussion of the golden line is clearly based upon this tradition concerning the position of epithets. Burles's golden line is a narrow application of the principles outlined by Bede almost a millennium earlier.

The earliest citations of the golden line term, such as Burles, are in British guides to composing Latin verses, and it seems that the term derives from school assignments in 17th century Britain and perhaps earlier.

Scholars like to believe that their critical approaches to classical poetry are direct and immediate, and that they understand classical literature in its own context or, depending on their critical stance, from the perspective of their own context(s). However, the use of "the golden line" as a critical term in modern scholarship demonstrates the power of the intervening critical tradition. The golden line may originally have been the teres versus of Diomedes, but this fact does not legitimate its use as a critical term today. No commentators today count up versus inlibati, iniuges, quinquipartes, or any of the other bizarre forms assembled by Diomedes.

Far more interesting than the appearance of the golden line in ancient and medieval poetry is the use of the term by these modern critics. Today major works and commentaries on canonical poets in Latin and Greek discuss them in light of the golden line, and occasionally even the silver line: Neil Hopkinson's Callimachus, William Anderson's Metamorphoses, Richard Thomas's Georgics, Alan Cameron's Claudian, Andy Orchard's Aldhelm. Most of these critics assume or imply that golden lines were deliberate figures, practiced since Hellenistic times and artfully contrived and composed by the poets in question. This process of scouring the canonical texts for such special verse forms is entirely in the spirit of the ancient lists of Servius, Victorinus, and Diomedes Grammaticus. Thus, in a curious way, the arcane wordplay that fascinated ancient grammarians has—in the English-speaking world, at least—come again to play a role in interpreting and explicating the central works of the classical canon.

== In non-English scholarship ==
Although English-speaking scholars have referred to the golden line since 1612, the first non-English scholars to mention the form appear to be around 1955. Non-English-speaking scholars who refer to the golden line in print usually pointedly use the English term: Munari 1955:53-4 "golden lines", Hernández Vista 1963: "golden lines", Thraede p. 51: "die Spielarten der 'golden line.' " Baños p. 762: "el denominado versus aureus o golden line" Hellegouarc'h p. 277: "l'origine du 'versus aureus' ou 'golden line.'" Schmitz p. 149 n 113, "der von John Dryden gepraegte Terminus Golden Line." Baños, Enríquez, and Hellegouarc'h all refer exclusively to Wilkinson 215–217 and other English scholars for discussions of the term. Typical would be the French article of Kerlouégan, which never mentions the term, but which is entirely devoted to the form. Scholars writing in all languages use English golden line used together with translations such as verso áureo (Spanish, first attested 1961), verso aureo (Italian 1974), goldene Zeile (German 1977), vers d’or (French 1997), goldener Vers (German 1997), gouden vers (Dutch 1998), goue versreels (Afrikaans 2001), χρυσóς στíχоς (Greek 2003), Золотой стих (Russian 2004), zlaté verše (Slovak 2007), verso dourado (Portuguese 2009) and vers d’or (Catalan 2013). However, in most scholarship in languages besides English (and by non-native speakers writing in English) the dominant term has been versus aureus.

Precursors

These works are often cited in golden line literature, but they do not mention the term and are only peripherally connected to the form, except for Kerlouégan:

- 1908 – Friedrich Caspari, De ratione, quae inter Vergilium et Lucanum intercedat, quaestiones selectae. Dissertation, Leipzig, p. 85-93.
- 1916 – Eduard Norden, P. Vergilius Maro Aeneis Buch VI Teubner, Leipzig Berlin, p. 384-389.
- 1949 – J. Marouzeau, L' Ordre des mots dans la phrase latine. Volume Complementaire p. 106 paragraph 266 and p. 127 paragraph 18.
- 1972 – François Kerlouégan, "Une mode stylistique dans la prose latine des pays celtiques." Études Celtiques 13:275–297.

Chronological listing of non-English golden line citations

- 1955 – F. Munari, Marci Valerii Bucolica. Collez. Filol. Testi e Manuali. 2 (Firenze: Vallecchi Editore, 1955) p. 53.
- 1961 – J. de Echave-Sustaeta, 'Acotaciones al estilo de Las Geórgicas', Helmantica 12, no. 37 (1961), pp. 5–26.
- 1962 – J. Echave-Sustaeta, Virgilio Eneida libro II. Introducción, edición y comentario, Madrid: Clásicos Emerita, C.S.I.C 1962 p. 40.
- 1963 – V. E. Hernández Vista, 'La introducción del episodio de la muerte de Príamo: estudio estilístico', Estudios Clásicos 38, (1963), pp. 120–36.
- 1964 – M. Lokrantz, L'opera poetica Di S. Pier damiani. Acta Univ. Stockh. Stud. Lat. Stockh. (Stockholm: Almqvist & Wiksell, 1964).
- 1969 – Serafín Enríquez López, Virgilio en sus versos aureos : tesis de Licenciatura, Barcelona : Universidad de Barcelona. Facultad de Filosofía y Letras. Sección Lenguas Clásicas, 1969 Directed by Javier Echave-Sustaeta.
- 1969 – Iosephus (J.M.) Mir, "Laocoontis Embolium" Latinitas vol 17 1969 p. 101-112.
- 1970 – Iosephus (J.M.) Mir “De verborum ordine in oratione Latina. Pars I.” Latinitas, 18: 32-50, p. 40.
- 1972 – Iosephus (J.M.) Mir, “Quid nos doceat Vergilius ex disciplina stilistica proposito quodam Aeneidis loco” Palaestrina Latina 42.4 (1972) p. 163-176. p.174-175.
- 1972 – Francisco Palencia Cortés "El mundo visual-dinámico-sonoro de Virgilio." Cuadernos de Filología Clásica 3 (1972) p. 357-393. (p. 370-374).
- 1973 – Veremans, J. 1973. “Compte-Rendu Des Séances Du Groupe Strasbourgeois.” Rev. Etud. Lat. 51: 29–32. See Veremans 1976
- 1973 – Javier Echave-Sustaeta, "Virgilio desde dentro dos claves de estilo en las «Églogas»" Estudios clásicos,17, Nº 69-70, 1973, p. 261-289. p.284.
- 1974 – Arsenio Pérez Álvarez El Verso áureo en Juvenco: tesis de licenciatura; bajo la dirección del Doctor José Closa Farré. Barcelona: Universidad de Barcelona. Facultad de Filosofía y Letras. Departamento de Filología Latina, 1974
- 1974 – G. B. Conte, Saggio Di Commento a Lucano: Pharsalia VI 118-260, l'Aristia Di Sceva (Pisa: Libreria goliardica, 1974), p. 72.
- 1975 – Werner Simon, Claudiani Panegyricus de consulatu Manlii Theodori: (Carm. 16 u. 17), Berlin: Seitz, 1975, p. 141.
- 1976 – Ulrich Justus Stache, Flavius Cresconius Corippus in laudem Iustini Augusti Minoris. Ein Kommentar. Berlin: Mielke 1976, p. 110
- 1976 – Jozef Veremans, “L'asclépiade mineur chez Horace, Sénèque, Terentianus Maurus, Prudence, Martianus Capella et Luxorius”, Latomus, 35, Fasc. 1 (JANVIER-MARS 1976), pp. 12-42. Note: the apparent beginning of a bizarre Francophone understanding of the term to mean minor asclepiads with two hemistichs each with 2 words of 3 syllables.
- 1976 – Dietmar Korzeniewski, Hirtengedichte aus spätrömischer und karolingischer Zeit: Marcus Aurelius Olympius Nemesianus, Severus Sanctus Endelechius, Modoinus, Hirtengedicht aus d. Codex Gaddianus, Wiss. Buchges., 1976 p. 126
- 1977 – Victor Schmidt, Redeunt Saturnia regna: Studien zu Vergils vierter Ecloga, Dissertation. Groningen., 1977 p. 132 Attributessperrungen (goldene Zeile) also p. 10.
- 1977 – Antoni González i Senmartí, “En torno al problema de la Cronología de Nono: su posible datación a partir de testimonios directos e indirectos,” Universitas Tarraconensis 2 (1977) p. 25-160. p. 95-96, 151.
- 1977 – Javier Echave-Sustaeta, “El estilo de la Oda I, 1 de Horacio,” Anuario de filología, ISSN 0210-1343, Nº. 3, 1977, págs. 81-100, p. 92
- 1978 – Klaus Thraede. Der Hexameter in Rom. Munich: C. H. Beck'sche. p. 51: "die Spielarten der 'golden line.'
- 1978 – Giovanni Ravenna “Note su una formula narrativa (forte -- verbo finito) " in Miscellanea di Studi in Memoria di Marino Barchiesi. Rivista Di Cultura Classica E Medioevale vol 20 1978 p. 1117-1128. p. 1118 1126.
- 1978 – Raul Xavier. Vocabulário de poesia Rio de Janeiro: Imago. 1978. p. 53.
- 1987 – J. Hellegouarc'h, "Les yeux de la marquise...Quelques observations sur les commutations verbales dans l'hexamètre latin." Revue des Études Latines 65:261–281.
- 1988 – S. Enríquez El hexámetro áureo en latín. Datos para su estudio, Tesis doctoral, Granada (available in microfiche).
- 1990 – Marina del Castillo Herrera, La metrica Latina en el Siglo IV. Diomedes y su entorno. Granada: Universidad de Granada. Connects Diomedes' teres versus with the áureo verso but does not define or elaborate.
- 1992 – J. M. Baños Baños, "El versus aureus de Ennio a Estacio", Latomus 51 p. 762-744.
- 1993 – Norbert Delhey. Apollinaris Sidonius, Carm. 22: Burgus Pontii Leontii. Einleitung, Text und Kommentar. Untersuchungen zur antiken Literatur und Geschichte 40. Berlin/New York, p. 86. (silver lines).
- 1994 – J. J. L. Smolenaars, Statius: Thebaid VII, Commentary. Leiden: E.J. Brill, p. 37.
- 1995 – Fernando Navarro Antolín, Lygdamus: Corpus Tibullianum III. 1–6, New York : E.J. Brill, 1995, p. 381.
- 1998 – Dirk Panhuis, Latijnse grammatica. Garant, Leuven-Apeldoorn "gouden, zilveren, en bronzen vers."
- 1999 – S. Enríquez. "El hexámetro áureo en la poesía latina", Estudios de Métrica Latina" I, pp.327–340, Luque Moreno-Díaz Díaz (eds.).
- 2000 – Christine Schmitz, Das Satirische in Juvenals Satiren. Berlin: de Gruyter, 2000, p. 148-9.
- 2003 – Abdel-gayed Mohamed, A.H. 2003. Scholia Sto 10 Vivlio Epigrammaton Tou Martiali (Epigr. 1-53) Σχολια Στο 10ο Βιβλιο Επιγραμματων Του Μαρτιαλη (Επιγρ. 1 – 53). Thessalonike, Greece: Aristoteleio Panepistemio Thessalonikis Philosophiki Scholi Αριστοτελειο Πανεπιστημιο Θεσσαλονικης Φιλοσοφικη Σχολη - Τμημα Φιλολογιας Τομεας Κλασικων Σποδων.
- 2004 – Andreas Grüner, Venus ordinis der Wandel von Malerei und Literatur im Zeitalter der römischen Bürgerkriege. Paderborn: Verlag Ferd.Schoning GmbH & Co, 2004, p. 88-94. "Seit Dryden bezeichnet man das betreffende Schema als golden line."
- 2004 – Enrico Di Lorenzo. L'esametro greco e latino. Analisi, problemi e prospettive, Atti delle "Giornate di Studio" su L'esametro greco e latino: analisi, problemi e prospettive. Fisciano 28 e 29 maggio 2002. Quaderni del Dipartimento di Scienze dell'Antichità. Napoli, p. 77.
- 2004 – Shmarakov, R.L. 2004. “‘Jeweled Style’ и Архитектоника Целого: ‘Гильдонова Война’ Клавдиана.” Вестник Тульского Государственного Педагогического Университета. 1: 67–73.
- 2007 – Škoviera, D. 2007. “Der Humanistische Dichter Valentinus Ecchius Und Die Legende von Dem Heiligen Paulus Dem Eremiten = Humanistický Básnik Valentín Ecchius a Legenda o Svätom Pavlovi Pustovníkovi.” Graecolatina Orient. 29–30: 109–40.
- 2008 – Unknown author "Gouden Vers: PV in het midden + 2 adj vooraan + 2 subst achteraan (of omgekeerd)"
- 2009 – Vieira, B. 2009. “Em Que Diferem Os Versos de Virgílio e Lucano.” Aletria Rev. Estud. Lit. 19.3: 29–45.

== See also ==
- Hyperbaton
- Prosody (Latin)
- Synchysis

== Bibliography ==
- Edward Burles, Grammatica Burlesa. London 1652, p. 357. Facsimile edition, ed. R. C. Alston, in the series English Linguistics 1500-1800 (A Collection of Facsimile Reprints), 307. Menston, England: Scholar Press Ltd. 1971.
- Marina del Castillo Herrera, La metrica Latina en el Siglo IV. Diomedes y su entorno, Granada: Universidad de Granada, 1990.
- Seppo Heikkinen, "From Persius to Wilkinson: The Golden Line Revisited", Arctos : Acta Philologica Fennica 49 (2015), pages 57-77.
- Kenneth Mayer, "The schoolboys' revenge: how the golden line entered classical scholarship", Classical Receptions Journal, Volume 12, Issue 2, April 2020, Pages 248–278, https://doi.org/10.1093/crj/clz029
- Kenneth Mayer, "The Golden Line: Ancient and Medieval Lists of Special Hexameters and Modern Scholarship," in Carol Lanham, ed., Latin Grammar and Rhetoric: Classical Theory and Modern Practice, Continuum Press 2002, pp. 139–179.
- Andrew Orchard, The Poetic Art of Aldhelm, Cambridge: Cambridge University Press, 1994.
- L. P. Wilkinson, Golden Latin Artistry, Cambridge: Cambridge University Press, 1963, pp. 215–216.
- S. E. Winbolt, Latin Hexameter Verse: An Aid To Composition, London: Methuen, 1903, pp. 220–221.
