= Claudius Agathemerus =

1st century AD Greek physician

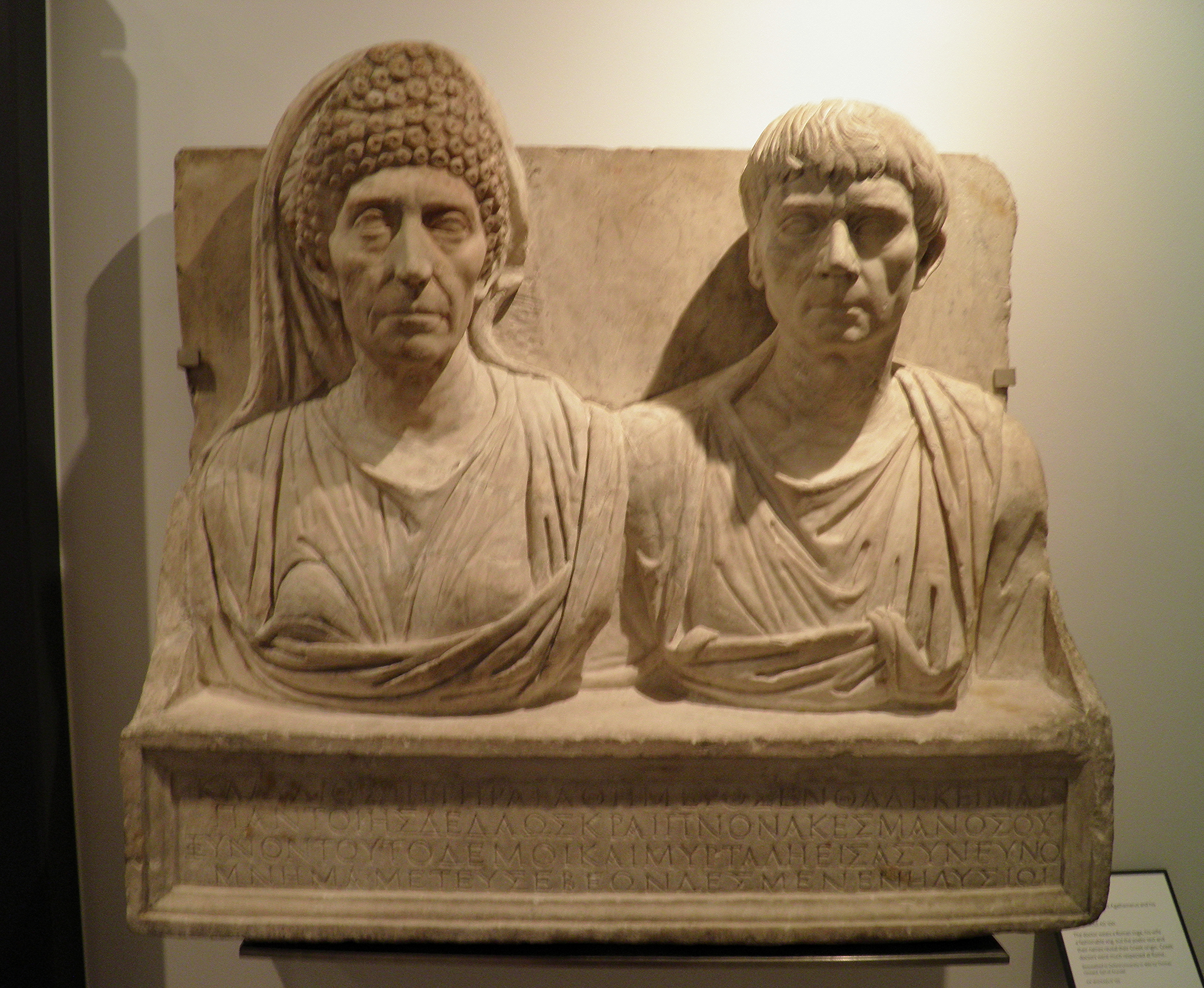
Tombstone, the doctor Claudius Agathemerus and his wife Myrtale, from Rome, about AD 100, Ashmolean Museum

Claudius Agathemerus (Ancient Greek: Κλαύδιος Ἀγαθήμερος) was an ancient Greek physician who lived in the 1st century. He was born in the Lacedaemon, and was a pupil of the philosopher Cornutus, in whose house he became acquainted with the poet Persius about 50 AD. In the old editions of Suetonius he is called Agaternus, a mistake which was first corrected by Reinesius, from the epitaph upon him and his wife, Myrtale, which is preserved in the Marmora Oxoniensia and the Greek Anthology. The apparent anomaly of a Roman praenomen being given to a Greek may be accounted for by the fact which we learn from Suetonius, that the Spartans were the hereditary clients of the gens Claudia.
