= Barbarism (linguistics) =

Linguistic deviation

A barbarism is a nonstandard word, expression or pronunciation in a language, particularly one regarded as an error in morphology, while a solecism is an error in syntax. The label was originally applied to mixing Ancient Greek or Latin with other languages, but expanded to indicate any inappropriate words or expressions in classical studies and eventually to any language considered unpolished or rude. The term is used mainly for the written language.

With no accepted technical meaning in modern linguistics, the term is little used by contemporary descriptive scientists.

== Classical ==
The word barbarism (Greek: βαρβαρισμός) was originally used by the Greeks for foreign terms used in their language and is related to the word "barbarian".

The first Latin grammarian to use the word barbarolexis was Marius Plotius Sacerdos in the 3rd century AD. Cominianus provides a definition. Charisius, in the 4th century, clearly excluded Greek words from being considered barbarisms in Latin. According to Raija Vainio, "if a word—either a Latin or a Greek one—was corrupted by an element from another language, this was a barbarolexis, a barbarous way of writing the word."

Isidore of Seville around 625 in his Etymologiae defines a barbarism as, "the uttering of a word with an error in a letter or in a quantity...And it is called barbarism from the barbarian peoples, since they were ignorant of the purity of Latin speech; for each nation becoming subject to the Romans, transmitted to Rome along with their wealth their faults, both of speech and of morals."

== English ==
The earliest use of the word in English to describe inappropriate usage was in the 16th century to refer to mixing other languages with Latin or Greek, especially in texts treating classics. By the seventeenth century barbarism had taken on a more general, less precise sense of unsuitable language. In The History of Philosophy, for example, Thomas Stanley declared, "Among the faults of speech is Barbarisme, a phrase not in use with the best persons, and Solecisme, a speech incoherently framed" [sic].

Hybrid words, which combine affixes or other elements borrowed from multiple languages, were sometimes decried as barbarisms. Thus, the authors of the Encyclopædia Metropolitana criticized the French word linguistique ("linguistics") as "more than ordinary barbarism, for the Latin substantive lingua is here combined, not merely with one, but with two Greek particles". Such mixing is "casual and massive" in modern English.

Although barbarism has no precise technical definition, the term is still used in non-technical discussions of language use to describe a word or usage as incorrect or nonstandard. Gallicisms (use of French words or idioms), Germanisms, Hispanisms, and so forth in English can be construed as examples of barbarisms, as can Anglicisms in other languages.

== Russian ==
In the 18th and the 19th centuries, the Russian of the noble classes was severely "barbarized" by French. Speaking in French had become not only fashionable but also a sign of distinction of a properly groomed person. One may see a prominent example in Leo Tolstoy's War and Peace. While the cream of the high society could afford a genuine French gouvernante (governess, or female live-in tutor), the provincial "upper class" had problems. Still, the desire to show off their education produced what Aleksander Griboyedov's Woe from Wit termed "the mixture of the tongues: French with Nizhegorodian" (смесь языков: французского с нижегородским). French-Nizhegorodian was often used for comical effect in literature and theatre.

== See also ==
- Classical compound
- Fowler's Dictionary of Modern English Usage
- Vulgarism
- Error (linguistics)
- Solecism
