= Hiberno-Latin =

Learned style of literary Latin

- Region: Ireland
- Era: 6th-12th centuries
- Language family: Indo-European: Italic; Latino-Faliscan; Classical Latin; Vulgar Latin; Hiberno-Latin
- Early forms: Proto-Indo-European: Proto-Italic; Proto-Latino-Faliscan; Old Latin
- Writing system: Latin

Language codes
- ISO 639-3: None (mis)
- Glottolog: None
- IETF: la-IE

Hiberno-Latin was a learned style of literary Latin first used and subsequently spread by Irish monks during the period from the sixth century to the twelfth century.

== Vocabulary and influence ==
Hiberno-Latin was notable for its curiously learned vocabulary. While neither Hebrew nor Greek was widely known in Western Europe during this period, odd words from these sources, as well as from Irish and British sources, were added to Latin vocabulary by these authors. It has been suggested that the unusual vocabulary of the poems was the result of the monks learning Latin words from dictionaries and glossaries which did not distinguish between obscure and common words; unlike many others in Western Europe at the time, the Irish monks did not speak a language descended from Latin. During the sixth and seventh centuries AD, Irish monasticism spread through Christian Europe; Irish monks who founded these monasteries often brought Hiberno-Latin literary styles with them.

Notable authors whose works contain something of the Hiberno-Latin spirit include St Columba, St Columbanus, St Adamnan, and Virgilius Maro Grammaticus. St Gildas, the Welsh author of the De Excidio et Conquestu Britanniae, is also credited with the Lorica, or Breastplate, an apotropaic charm against evil that is written in a curiously learned vocabulary; this too probably relates to an education in the Irish styles of Latin. John Scotus Eriugena was probably one of the last Irish authors to write Hiberno-Latin wordplay. St Hildegard of Bingen preserves an unusual Latin vocabulary that was in use in her convent, and which appears in a few of her poems; this invention may also be influenced by Hiberno-Latin. According to Charles D. Wright, the Hiberno-Latin language went extinct around the twelfth century as the Visio Tnugdali was also written in the Hiberno-Latin as a final flourish for the language.

== Hisperica Famina ==
The style reaches its peak in the Hisperica Famina, which means roughly "Western orations"; these Famina are rhetorical descriptive poems couched in a kind of free verse. Hisperica is understood as a portmanteau word combining Hibernia, Ireland, and Hesperides, the semi-legendary "Western Isles" that may have been inspired by the Azores or the Canary Islands; the coinage is typical of the wordplay used by these authors. A brief excerpt from a poem on the dawn from the Hisperica Famina shows the Irish poet decorating his verses with Greek words:

Titaneus olimphium inflamat arotus tabulatum,
thalasicum illustrat vapore flustrum . . .

Translation:

The titanian star inflames the dwelling places of Olympus,
and illuminates the sea's calm with vapour.

One usage of Hesperia in classical times was as a synonym for Italy, and it is noticeable that some of the vocabulary and stylistic devices of these pieces originated not among the Irish, but with the priestly and rhetorical poets who flourished within the world dominated ecclesiastically by Rome (especially in Italy, Gaul, Spain and Africa) between the fourth and the sixth centuries, such as Juvencus, Avitus of Vienne, Dracontius, Ennodius and Venantius Fortunatus. (Thus the very word famen, plural famina – a pseudo-archaic coinage from the classical verb fari, 'to speak' – is first recorded in the metrical Gospels Evangeliorum libri of Juvencus. Similarly, the word-arrangement often follows the sequence adjective 1 - adjective 2 - verb - noun 1 - noun 2, known as the "golden line", a pattern used to excess in the too-regular prosody of these poets; the first line quoted above is an example.) The underlying idea, then, would be to cast ridicule on these Roman-oriented writers by blending their stylistic tricks with incompetent scansion and applying them to unworthy subjects.

== Altus Prosator ==
On a much more intelligible level, the sixth-century abecedarian hymn Altus prosator shows many of the features of Hiberno-Latin: the word prosator, the "first sower" meaning creator, refers to God using an unusual neologism. The text of the poem also contains the word iduma, meaning "hands;" this is probably from Hebrew ידים (yadaim, "two hands"). The poem is also an extended alphabetical acrostic, another example of the wordplay typical of Hiberno-Latin. Irish (but not Continental) manuscripts traditionally attributed the poem to the sixth-century Irish mystic Saint Columba, but this attribution is doubtful. Marking with an asterisk (*) words that are learned, neologisms, unusually spelled, or unusual in the context they stand, the poem begins:

Altus *prosator, *vetustus
dierum et ingenitus
erat absque origine
primordii et *crepidine
est et erit in sæcula
sæculorum infinita;
cui est unigenitus
Xristus et sanctus spiritus
coæternus in gloria
deitatis perpetua.
Non tres deos *depropimus
sed unum Deum dicimus,
salva fide in personis
tribus gloriosissimis.

Translation:

High creator, Ancient
of Days, and unbegotten,
who was without origin
at the beginning and foundation,
who is and shall be in infinite
ages of ages;
to whom was only begotten
Christ, and the Holy Ghost,
co-eternal in the everlasting
glory of Godhood.
We do not propose three gods,
but we speak of one God,
saving faith in three
most glorious Persons.

== Similar usage ==
- In Italian, Francesco Colonna created a similar style (in prose), packed with neologisms drawn from Hebrew, Greek and Latin, for his allegory Hypnerotomachia Poliphili (1499).
- The Spanish Golden Century poet Luis de Góngora was the champion of culteranismo (sometimes called gongorism in English), a style that subjected Spanish to abstruse Latinate neologism, obscure allusions to Classical mythology and violent hyperbaton.
- In English, euphuism – a 16th-century tendency named after the character Euphues who appears in two works by its chief practitioner John Lyly – shows similar qualities.

== See also ==
- British Latin
- Hermeneutic style
- Vulgar Latin

== Bibliography ==
- James Carney, Medieval Irish Lyrics Berkeley, 1967.
- Thomas Owen Clancy and Gilbert Márkus, Iona: the Earliest Poetry of a Celtic Monastery Edinburgh, 1995.
- Michael Herren, editor, The Hisperica Famina. (Pontifical Institute of Mediaeval Studies, Toronto)
  - Volume 1, 1974. ISBN 0-88844-031-6
  - Volume 2, 1987. ISBN 0-88844-085-5
- Andy Orchard, "The Hisperica famina as Literature" University of Toronto, 2000.
- Harris, Jason (2009). Making Ireland Roman: Irish Neo-Latin Writers and the Republic of Letters. Cork University Press. ISBN 978-1859184530.
