= Walter of Speyer =

German bishop and poet

Walter of Speyer (Note: German: Walt(h)er von Speyer, Latin: Gualterus Spirensis.) (967 – 3 December 1027) was a German writer and prelate who served as the bishop of Speyer from 1004.

== Life ==
Walter was born in 967. He was taught to read by his parents. He was sent to the cathedral school at Speyer at the age of seven to study under Bishop Balderic. Among the authors he studied were Homer (through the Ilias Latina), Martianus Capella, Horace, Persius, Juvenal, Boethius (the Consolation of Philosophy), Statius, Terence, Lucan and Virgil. By 984, he was a subdeacon.

Walter served as a chaplain to the Emperor Otto III, accompanying him to Venice in April 1001. By 8 August 1004 he was the bishop of Speyer. He described the diocese as a cowpatch (vaccina), i.e., a backwater. In 1007, he attended the Synod of Frankfurt in support of Henry II's creation of the diocese of Bamberg. In 1009, Henry granted him the right to mint coins at Marbach am Neckar. In 1013–1014, he negotiated Henry's the coronation as Holy Roman Emperor with Pope Benedict VIII.

Walter took part in the election of Conrad II in 1024. Four days after his election, Conrad made a major donation to Speyer and aid the cornerstone for a new cathedral that would serve as his burial place. The cathedral school flourished under Walter. An original charter of Walter's, with his seal, dated 7 April 1024, is the oldest in the episcopal archive. He died on 3 December 1027 His epitaph, written by Ekkehard IV, extols his education and learning.

== Works ==
A page from the Vita et passio sancti Christophori martyris

At Balderic's request, Walter wrote a Latin biography of Saint Christopher, the Vita et passio sancti Christophori martyris ('life and suffering of the holy martyr Christopher'). He began the work when he was 14 or 15 years old and finished it three years later in 984, publishing it only after Balderic's death in 986. It consists of two accounts of Christopher's life and martyrdom "in the prose of Cicero and the verse of Vergil", in his own words, edited by Balderic. The verse account is divided into six books of hexameters. They are prefaced by two dedicatory letters, a prologue and a poem on his own education, known as the Libellus scholasticus, which is an important source of information on the 10th-century cathedral curriculum. One of the letters was sent with a copy of the work to the nun Hazecha, the treasurer of Quedlinburg Abbey and a former classmate. Hazecha had also written a life of Christopher in verse, but a librarian had misplaced it. The other letter was sent with a copy to Liutfred, Benzo and Friderich at Salzburg Cathedral sometime after 986. The Salzburg copy is the only surviving copy and it includes a copy of the letter to Hazecha. The manuscript is now Munich, Bayerische Staatsbibliothek, Clm 14798.

The Munich manuscript also contains another short composition by Walter, called De sizzugiis ('on syzygy'). It consists of a figure made of Balderic's and Walter's intertwined names surrounded by four hexameters forming a square.

A friend of Burchard of Worms, Walter is suspected of having contributed to Burchard's Decretum, a collection of canon law.
