= Diomedes Grammaticus =

Latin Grammarian during 4th century CE

Diomedes Grammaticus was a Latin grammarian who probably lived in the late 4th century AD. He wrote a grammatical treatise, known either as De Oratione et Partibus Orationis et Vario Genere Metrorum libri III or Ars grammatica in three books, dedicated to a certain Athanasius. Since he is frequently quoted by Priscian (e.g. lib. ix. pp. 861, 870, lib. x. 879, 889, 892), he must have lived before the year 500. His third book on poetry is particularly valuable, containing extracts from Suetonius's De poetica. This book contains one of the most complete lists of types of dactylic hexameters in antiquity, including the teres versus, which may (or may not) be the so-called "golden line." Diomedes wrote about the same time as Charisius and used the same sources independently. The works of both grammarians are valuable, but whereas much of Charisius has been lost, the Ars of Diomedes has come down to us complete (although probably abridged). In book I he discusses the eight parts of speech; in II the elementary ideas of grammar and of style; in III poetry, quantity, and meters. The best edition is in H. Keil's Grammatici Latini, vol I.
