= French adverbs =

Adverbs in French, like in English, are used to modify adjectives, other adverbs, and verbs or clauses. They do not display any inflection; that is, their form does not change to reflect their precise role, nor any characteristics of what they modify.

== Formation ==
In French, as in English, most adverbs are derived from adjectives. In most cases, this is done by adding the suffix -ment ("-ly") to the adjective's feminine singular form. For example, the feminine singular form of lent ("slow") is lente, so the corresponding adverb is lentement ("slowly"); similarly, heureux → heureusement ("happy" → "happily").

As in English, however, the adjective stem is sometimes modified to accommodate the suffix:

- If the adjective ends in an i, then -ment is added to the masculine singular (default) form, rather than to the feminine singular form:
  - vrai → vraiment ("real" → "really")
  - poli → poliment ("polite" → "politely")
- If the adjective ends in -ant or -ent, then the -nt is stripped and -mment is added:
  - constant → constamment ("constant" → "constantly")
  - récent → récemment ("recent" → "recently") (-emment and -amment have the same pronunciation: [amɑ̃])
- Some adjectives make other changes:
  - précis → précisément ("precise" → "precisely")
  - gentil → gentiment ("nice" → "nicely")

Some adverbs are derived from adjectives in completely irregular fashions, not even using the suffix -ment:

- bon → bien ("good" → "well")
- mauvais → mal ("bad" → "badly")
- meilleur → mieux (the adjective "better" → the adverb "better")
- traditionally, pire → pis (the adjective "worse" → the adverb "worse") or more commonly, pire → pire

And, as in English, many common adverbs are not derived from adjectives at all:

- ainsi ("thus" or "this way")
- vite ("quickly")

== Placement ==
The placement of French adverbs is almost the same as the placement of English adverbs.

An adverb that modifies an adjective or adverb comes before that adjective or adverb:

- complètement vrai ("completely true")
- pas possible ("not possible")
- trop bien cuit ("too well cooked" or "overdone")

An adverb that modifies an infinitive (verbal noun) generally comes after the infinitive:

- marcher lentement ("to walk slowly")

But negative adverbs, such as pas ("not"), plus ("not any more"), and jamais ("never"), come before the infinitive:

- ne pas marcher ("not to walk")

An adverb that modifies a main verb or clause comes either after the verb, or before the clause:

- Lentement il commença à marcher or Il commença lentement à marcher ("Slowly he began to walk" or "He began slowly to walk")

Note that, unlike in English, this is true even of negative adverbs:

- Jamais je n'ai fait cela or Je n'ai jamais fait cela ("Never have I done that" or "I have never done that").

== Semantic classification ==
Traditionally, adverbs are divided semantically into three large subcategories: those expressing place or time; those expressing manner, quantity, affirmation, doubt, or negation; and those establishing a logical relation. To these three groups may be added adverbs of connection (or linking), adverbs used as interrogative or exclamatory words, and, finally, modal adverbs. Certain adverbs may belong to several of these subcategories at once.

=== Adverbs of place ===
This type of adverb gives an indication of place for the word it modifies.

à droite, à gauche, ailleurs, alentour, après, arrière, autour, avant, dedans, dehors, derrière, dessous, devant, ici, là, là-bas, loin, où, partout, près, vis-à-vis, etc.

=== Adverbs of time ===
This type of adverb provides an indication of time (duration or chronological sequence) to the word it modifies.

alors, après, aujourd'hui, auparavant, aussitôt, autrefois, avant, bientôt, cependant, déjà, demain, depuis, désormais, enfin, ensuite, hier, jadis, jamais, maintenant, parfois, par semaine, quand, quelquefois, soudain, souvent, sur ces entrefaites, tard, tôt, toujours, tout à coup, tout de suite, etc.

=== Adverbs of manner ===
An adverb in this subcategory provides an indication of manner to the word it modifies.

à bras-le-corps, à califourchon, admirablement, ainsi, à la légère, à la va-comme-je-te-pousse, à la va-vite, à l'aveuglette, à loisir, à nouveau, à tire-d'aile, à tire-larigot, à tort, à tue-tête, aussi, bel et bien, bien, bon marché, comme, comment, d'arrache-pied, debout, de guingois, également, ensemble, exprès, mal, mieux, n'importe comment, pis, plutôt, pour de bon, presque, tant bien que mal, vite, volontiers, etc.

In this group may also be included the majority of adverbs ending in -ment.

=== Adverbs of affirmation ===
This type of adverb provides an indication of affirmation (or doubt) to the word it modifies.

assurément, certainement, certes, oui, peut-être, précisément, probablement, sans doute, volontiers, vraiment, etc.

In contemporary usage, the adverb oui is used rather as an interjection.

The semantics of these adverbs being of the order of epistemic modality, they can be included in the set of modal adverbs.

=== Adverbs of negation ===
This type of adverb brings an indication of negation to the word it modifies. An adverb of negation most often forms an adverbial phrase, more specifically, a compound word, une locution discontinue.

Ne […] guère, ne […] jamais, ne […] pas, ne […] plus, ne […] point, ne […] rien, non, etc.

=== Adverbs of quantity ===
This type of adverb (also called "adverb of degree") supplies an indication of quantity to the word it modifies. It is used in the realm of grammatical comparison.

ainsi, assez, aussi, autant, beaucoup, combien, davantage, encore, environ, fort, guère, même, moins, peu, plus, presque, quelque, si, tant, tellement, tout, très, trop, un peu, etc.

An adverb of quantity can be combined with the preposition de to form a quantifier:

Beaucoup de bruit pour rien.

The quantifier (or "determiner" or "determinative phrase") consisting of the adverb beaucoup and the preposition de actualizes the noun bruit.

=== Adverbs of logical relation ===
Adverbs of logical relation express opposition, concession, cause, or consequence. These are logical connectors.

aussi, cependant, donc, encore, en revanche, même, par ailleurs, par conséquent, par suite, pourtant, quand même, seulement, tout de même, toutefois, etc.

=== Linking adverbs ===
Linking adverbs, also called "sentence adverbs" or "connecteurs," are adverbs (often adverbs of logical relation) which modify not a verb exactly, but, rather, an entire proposition, an entire sentence. Their role is to introduce a sentence just as a coordinating conjunction does; used this way, these adverbs become "function words." This category partially overlaps with the preceding.

ainsi, alors, aussi, certes, donc, en effet, enfin, ensuite, par contre, pourtant, puis, tantôt, etc.

For example,

Il mangea une pomme, puis alla immédiatement se coucher.

=== Interrogative and exclamatory adverbs ===
These are adverbs of quantity, manner, place, cause, time, etc., used in direct or indirect interrogative or exclamatory sentences. Just like the adverbs of the preceding category, they lose their quality of lexical word to become true function words.

combien, combien de, comme, comment, pourquoi, quand.

For example,

Comment est-il allé à Paris ? / J'aimerais savoir comment il est allé à Paris. Il est allé à pied.

=== Modal adverbs ===
The nature of modal adverbs (or "modalizing adverbs") is not to modify a nucleus of the sentence, but to inform us of the attitude of the speaker with regard to their own speech. It could be said that such adverbs treat the speech act rather than the content of the speech.

certainement, hélas, heureusement, malheureusement, par bonheur, etc.

For example,

Hier, j'ai capturé un faisan vivant. Je comptais le manger aujourd'hui. Or, cette nuit, il s'est malheureusement échappé du poulailler où je l'avais mis.

From a strictly syntactic point of view, the adverb malheureusement modifies the verb s’est échappé, but from a semantic point of view, it is hard to imagine that the pheasant in question could have been "unhappy" to escape the cooking pot. Here, the speaker actually indicates their own perspective on the facts they recount.

Such adverbs constitute modal adjuncts (or "sentence modifiers"). Being situated on another plane than the utterance that surrounds them, they are often syntactically independent and thus approach the quality of an interjection or parenthetical (for example, car ensuite). So, in the previous example with the pheasant, the last sentence could just as well be written, or read, in these three forms:

- Or, cette nuit, il s'est, malheureusement, échappé du poulailler où je l'avais mis.
- Or, cette nuit, il s'est (malheureusement !) échappé du poulailler où je l'avais mis.
- Or, cette nuit, il s'est—malheureusement—échappé du poulailler où je l'avais mis.

which are equivalent in meaning to this:

Or, cette nuit, il s'est—pour mon malheur—échappé du poulailler où je l'avais mis.
