= Lucius Annaeus Cornutus =

1st century AD Roman Stoic philosopher

Lucius Annaeus Cornutus (fl. 60s AD; Ancient Greek: Λεύκιος Ἀνναῖος Κορνοῦτος) was a Stoic philosopher who flourished in the reign of Nero, when his house in Rome was a school of philosophy.

== Life ==
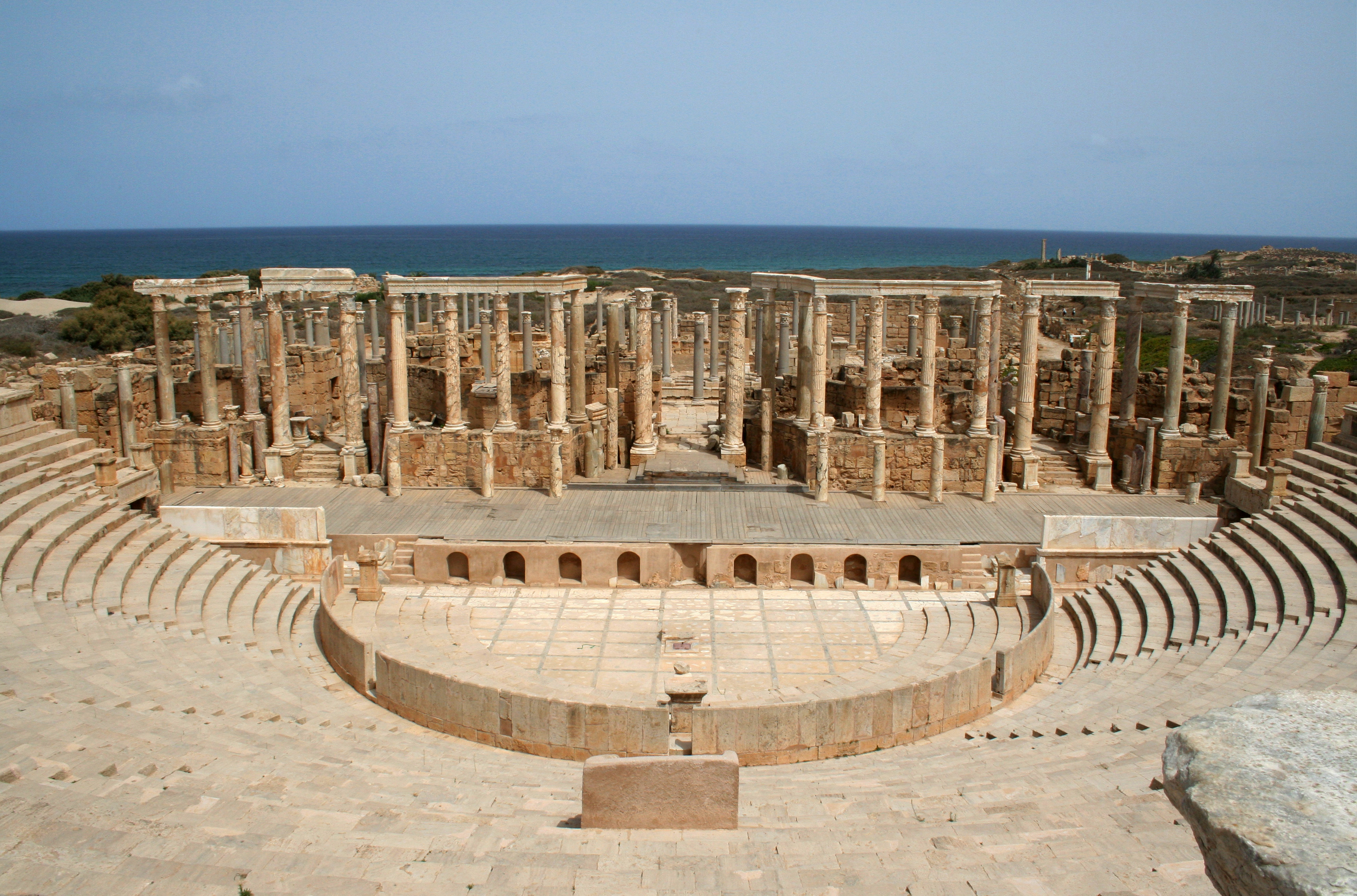
The amphitheatre of Leptis Magna, built during Cornutus' lifetime.

Cornutus was a native of Leptis Magna in Libya, but resided for the most part in Rome. He is best known as the teacher and friend of Persius, whose fifth satire is addressed to him, as well as other distinguished students, such as Claudius Agathemerus. "Through Cornutus Persius was introduced to Annaeus, as well as to Lucan, who was of his own age, and also a disciple of Cornutus". At Persius's death, Cornutus returned to Persius' sisters a bequest made to him, but accepted Persius' library of some 700 scrolls. He revised the deceased poet's satires for publication, but handed them over to Caesius Bassus to edit, at the special request of the latter.

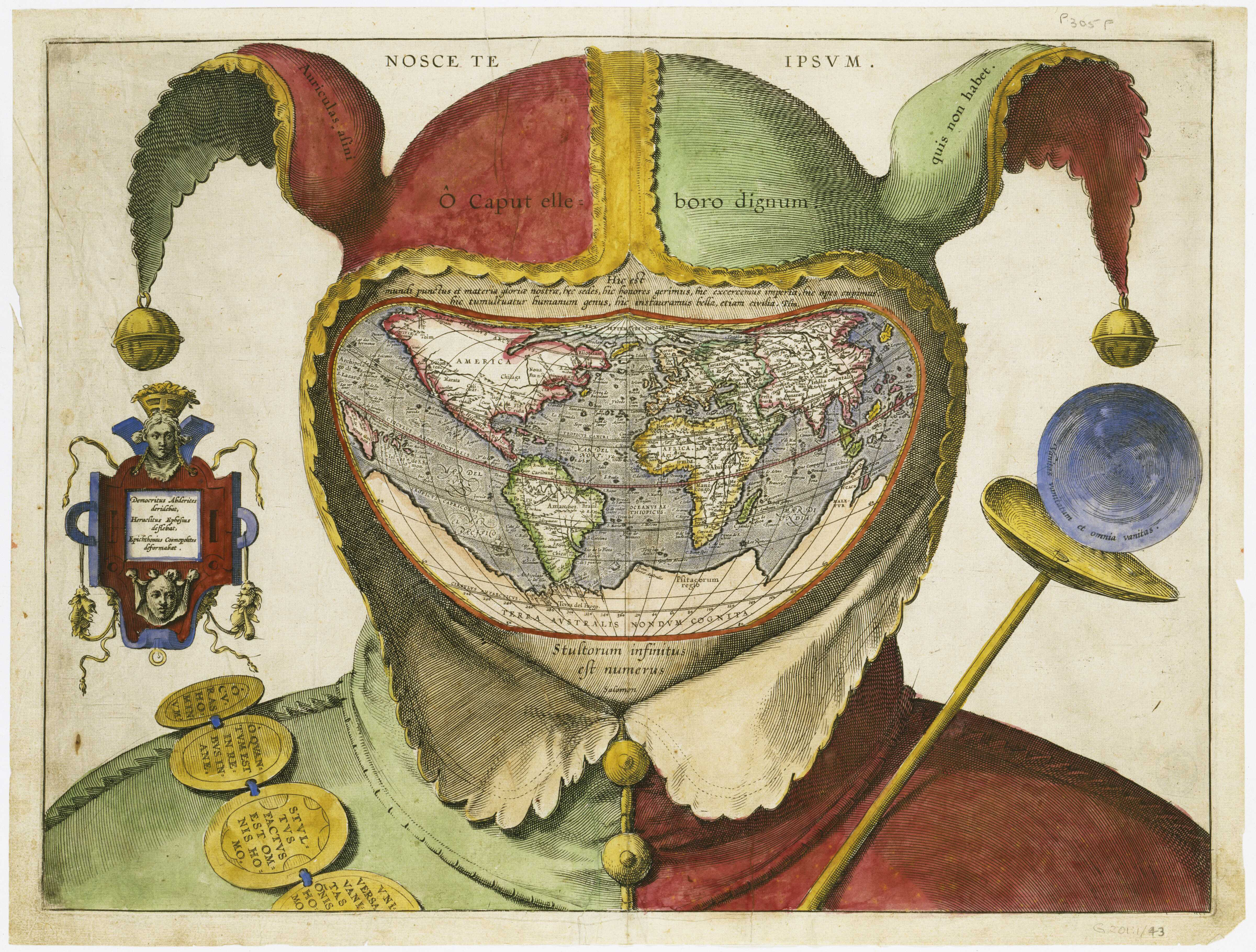
Fool's Cap Map of the World (1580s), with Cornutus' Auriculas asini quis non habet? on the ears.

Among Persius's satires were lines that, as Suetonius records, "even lashed Nero himself, who was then the reigning prince. The verse ran as follows:

Auriculas asini Mida rex habet
(King Midas has an ass's ears)

but Cornutus altered it to:

Auriculas asini quis non habet?
Who has not an ass's ears?

in order that it might not be supposed that it was meant to apply to Nero."

Annaeus Cornutus was banished by Nero nevertheless – in 66 or 68 AD – for having indirectly disparaged the emperor's projected history of the Romans in heroic verse, after which time nothing more is heard of him.

== Writings ==
He was the author of various rhetorical works in both Greek and Latin, such as De figuris sententiarum. Excerpts from his treatise De enuntiatione vel orthographia are preserved in Cassiodorus. A commentary on Virgil is frequently quoted by Servius, but tragedies mentioned by Suetonius have not survived.

Cornutus wrote a work on Rhetoric, and a commentary on the Categories of Aristotle, (πρὸς Ἁθηνόδωρον καὶ Ἀριστοτέλην) whose philosophy he attacked along with his fellow Stoic Athenodorus. He also wrote a work called On Properties (Περὶ ἐκτῶν).

=== Compendium of Greek Theology ===
His one major surviving work, the philosophical treatise, Theologiae Graecae compendium ("Compendium of Greek Theology") is a manual of "popular mythology as expounded in the etymological and symbolical interpretations of the Stoics". This early example of a Roman educational treatise, provided an account of Greek mythology on the bases of highly elaborated etymological readings. Cornutus sought to recover the earliest beliefs that primitive people had about the world by examining the various names and titles of the gods. The result, to modern eyes, is often bizarre, with many forced etymologies, as can be seen from the opening paragraph, where Cornutus describes Heaven (Ouranos):

The Heaven [ouranos], my boy, encompasses round about the earth and the sea and everything both on the earth and the sea. On this account it has acquired its appellation, since it is an "upper limit" [ouros anô] of all things and "marks of the bounds" [horizôn] of nature. Some say, however, that it is called Heaven [ouranos] from its "looking after" [ôrein] or "tending to" [ôreuein] things, that is, from its guarding them, from which also "doorkeeper" [thyrôros] and "watching carefully" [polyôrein] are named. Still others derive its etymology from its "being seen above" [horasthai anô]. Together with everything it encompasses, it is called the "world" [kosmos] from its being "so beautifully ordered" [diakekosmêsthai]

The book continues in a similar vein, proceeding from such gods as Zeus, Hera, Cronus, and Poseidon, to the Furies, Fates, Muses, and Graces. The work is pervaded throughout with a strong undercurrent of Stoic Physics.

We are told that the world has a soul that preserves it called Zeus who dwells in Heaven whose substance is fiery. Zeus is the power that pervades everything, and who assigns Fate to each person. The gods have sent us Reason (Logos), which does not work evil, but which is part of the divine Reason of the universe:

"Ocean" is the Logos that "glides swiftly" and changes continuously, whereas Tethys is the stability of the qualities. For from their blending or mixing come about those things that exist; and nothing would exist if either one unmixed gained the upper hand over the other.

=== Spurious works ===
Scholia to Persius are also attributed to Annaeus Cornutus; the latter, however, are of much later date, and are assigned by Jahn to the Carolingian period. The so-called Disticha Cornuti belong to the Late Middle Ages.

In 1891, Johannes Graeven proposed that an anonymous rhetorical treatise (the Anonymous Seguerianus) written in the 3rd century was written by a Cornutus. This attribution has not been generally accepted and, in any case, would refer to a later Cornutus.

== Editions ==
- Ramelli, Ilaria (ed.). Anneo Cornuto. Compendio di teologia greca. Milan: Bompiani Il Pensiero Occidentale. 2003. ISBN 8845292495.
- Torres, José B., Lucius Annaeus Cornutus: Compendium de Graecae Theologiae traditionibus, Bibliotheca Teubneriana, Berlin, De Gruyter, 2018. Online version at De Gruyter.
