= Chiasmus =

Reversal of grammatical structures in successive phrases

In rhetoric, chiasmus (Note: /kaɪˈæzməs/ ky-AZ-məs) or, less commonly, chiasm, (Note: Latin term from Greek χίασμα chiásma, "crossing", from the Greek χιάζω, chiázō, to shape like the letter "Χ") is the reversal of grammatical structures in successive phrases or clauses without repetition of words.

A similar device, antimetabole, also involves a reversal of grammatical structures in successive phrases or clauses in an A-B-B-A configuration, but unlike chiasmus, presents a repetition of words.

== Examples ==
Chiasmus balances words or phrases with similar, though not identical, meanings:

But O, what damned minutes tells he o'er
Who dotes, yet doubts; suspects, yet strongly loves.

— Shakespeare, Othello 3.3

"Dotes" and "strongly loves" share the same meaning and bracket, as do "doubts" and "suspects".

Additional examples of chiasmus:

By day the frolic, and the dance by night.

— Samuel Johnson, The Vanity of Human Wishes (1749)

Despised, if ugly; if she's fair, betrayed.

— Mary Leapor, "Essay on Woman" (1751)

For comparison, the following are considered antimetabole, in which the reversal in structure involves the same words:

Pleasure's a sin, and sometimes sin's a pleasure.

— Lord Byron, Don Juan (1824)

Whoever sheds human blood, / by humans shall their blood be shed;

— Genesis 9:6

Both chiasmus and antimetabole can be used to reinforce antithesis. In chiasmus, the clauses display inverted parallelism. Chiasmus was particularly popular in the literature of the ancient world, including Hebrew, Greek, Latin and K'iche' Maya, where it was used to articulate the balance of order within the text. Many long and complex chiasmi have been found in Shakespeare and the Greek and Hebrew texts of the Bible. Chiasmus is also found throughout the Quran and the Book of Mormon.

== Conceptual chiasmus ==
Chiasmus can be used in the structure of entire passages to parallel concepts or ideas. This process, termed "conceptual chiasmus", uses a criss-crossing rhetorical structure to cause an overlapping of "intellectual space". Conceptual chiasmus utilizes specific linguistic choices, often metaphors, to create a connection between two differing disciplines. By employing a chiastic structure to a single presented concept, rhetors encourage one area of thought to consider an opposing area's perspective.

== Effectiveness ==
Chiasmus represented as an "X" structure. When read left to right, top to bottom, the first topic (A) is reiterated as the last, and the middle concept (B) appears twice in succession.

Chiasmus derives its effectiveness from its symmetrical structure. The structural symmetry of the chiasmus imposes the impression upon the reader or listener that the entire argument has been accounted for. In other words, chiasmus creates only two sides of an argument or idea for the listener to consider, and then leads the listener to favor one side of the argument.

== Thematic chiasmus ==
The Wilhelmus, the national anthem of the Netherlands, has a structure composed around a thematic chiasmus: the 15 stanzas of the text are symmetrical, in that verses one and 15 resemble one another in meaning, as do verses two and 14, three and 13, etc., until they converge in the eighth verse, the heart of the song.

Written in the 16th century, the Wilhelmus originated in the nation's struggle to achieve independence. It tells of the Father of the Nation, William of Orange, who was stadholder in the Netherlands under the king of Spain. In the first person, as if quoting himself, William speaks to the Dutch people and talks about both the outer conflict – the Dutch Revolt – as well as his own, inner struggle: on one hand, he tries to be faithful to the king of Spain, on the other hand, he is above all faithful to his conscience: to serve God and the Dutch people. This is made apparent in the central 8th stanza: "Oh David, thou soughtest shelter from King Saul's tyranny. Even so I fled this welter". Here the comparison is made between the biblical David and William of Orange as merciful and just leaders who both serve under tyrannic kings. As the merciful David succeeds the unjust Saul and is rewarded by God with the kingdom of Israel, so too, with the help of God, will William be rewarded a kingdom; being either or both the Netherlands, and the kingdom of God.

== See also ==
- Antanaclasis
- Antimetabole
- Arch form
- Chiastic structure
- Contrapposto
- Figure of speech
- Golden line (a Latin poetic line based on an abAB structure)
- Palindrome
- Rhetoric
- Russian reversal
- Silver line (a Latin poetic line based on an abBA structure)
- Spoonerism
- Synchysis (the reverse of the chiasmus)
- The Throne Verse
- Transpositional pun

== Sources ==
- Baldrick, Chris. 2008. Oxford Dictionary of Literary Terms. Oxford University Press. New York. ISBN 978-0-19-920827-2
- Corbett, Edward P. J. and Connors, Robert J. 1999. Style and Statement. Oxford University Press. New York, Oxford. ISBN 0-19-511543-0
- Forsyth, Mark. 2014. The Elements of Eloquence. Berkley Publishing Group/Penguin Publishing. New York. ISBN 978-0-425-27618-1
- Lund, Nils Wilhelm (1942). Chiasmus in the New Testament, a study in formgeschichte. Chapel Hill: University of North Carolina Press. OCLC 2516087.
- McCoy, Brad (Fall 2003). "Chiasmus: An Important Structural Device Commonly Found in Biblical Literature" (PDF). CTS Journal. 9 (2). Albuquerque, New Mexico: Chafer Theological Seminary: 18–34. Archived from the original (PDF) on February 29, 2024.
- Parry, Donald W. (2007). Poetic Parallelisms in the Book of Mormon (PDF). Provo, Utah: Neal A. Maxwell Institute for Religious Scholarship. ISBN 978-0-934893-36-7. Archived from the original (PDF) on March 16, 2022.
- Smyth, Herbert Weir (1920). A Greek Grammar for Colleges. New York: American Book Company. p. 677. OCLC 402001.
- Welch, John W. (1995). "Criteria for Identifying and Evaluating the Presence of Chiasmus". Journal of Book of Mormon Studies. 4 (2). Brigham Young University. Archived from the original on October 13, 2015.
- Welch, John W. (1999) [1981]. Chiasmus in antiquity: structures, analyses, exegesis. Provo, Utah: Research Press. ISBN 0934893330. OCLC 40126818.
