= Synchysis =

Rhetorical technique

Synchysis is a rhetorical technique wherein words are intentionally scattered to create bewilderment, or for some other purpose. By disrupting the normal course of a sentence, it forces the audience to consider the meaning of the words and the relationship between them.

== Examples ==
- "I run and shoot, quickly and accurately."
- "Matter too soft a lasting mark to bear" – Alexander Pope, "Epistle II. To a Lady" (1743)
- "When earthquakes swallow, or when tempests sweep,
  Towns to one grave, whole nations to the deep" – Alexander Pope, Essay on Man.

(That is, "When earthquakes swallow towns to one grave, or when tempests sweep whole nations to the deep".)

== In poetry ==
This poetry form was favoured by Latin poets. It is described by the website Silva Rhetoricae as "Hyperbaton or anastrophe taken to an obscuring extreme, either accidentally or purposefully.". While some debate its intentionality in Latin poetry, Synchysis provided authors with creative flexibility while trying to conform to Greek and Latin metre.

Because various word orderings can be considered as synchyses, it may be opposed to the more distinct chiasmus, which is a phrase in the form A-B-B-A, either in the same line or in two consecutive lines. Synchysis can also be compared to anastrophe, a figure of speech in which a novel arrangement is contrasted with the typical ordering of the subject, object and verb in a language without free syntax in those elements.

A line of Latin verse in the form adjective A - adjective B - verb - noun A - noun B, with the verb in the center (or a corresponding chiastic line, again with the verb in the center), is known as a golden line. A highly common occurrence in Virgil's Aeneid, an example is aurea purpuream subnectit fibula vestem, "a golden clasp bound her purple cloak" (Virgil, Aeneid 4.139). Usually, synchysis is formed through the adjective A - adjective B - noun A - noun B structure, but it can also exist as adjective-noun-adjective-noun.

Today, it is mainly found in poetry, where poets use it to maintain metre or rhyme.

== Examples in Latin poetry ==
Catullus notably made use of synchysis in his poetry. Catullus 75 has this line:

Huc est mens deducta tuā mea Lesbia culpa

Taking mea with Lesbia this line reads:

To this point, (my) mind is reduced by your guilt, my Lesbia.

The correct way to translate the line, however, is to take it with the more distant mens, observing Catullus's synchysis:

To this point, Lesbia, my mind is reduced by your guilt.

Another example comes from Horace (Odes I.35, lines 5ff.), part of a hymn to a goddess:

te pauper ambit sollicitā prece
ruris colonus, te dominam aequoris

quicumque Tyrrhenā lacessit

Carpathium pelagus carinā.

The meaning is "thee, (the mistress) of the countryside, the poor farmer beseeches with anxious prayer, thee, the mistress of the ocean, whoever provokes the Carpathian sea in a Tyrrhenian boat (beseeches)", dominam being understood with ruris as well as aequoris. Often, through failure to spot the synchysis, ruris is taken with colonus, and the verse is incorrectly translated as "the poor farmer of the countryside".

== See also ==
- Chiasmus
- Golden line
