= Fool's Cap Map of the World =

Sixteenth-century world map

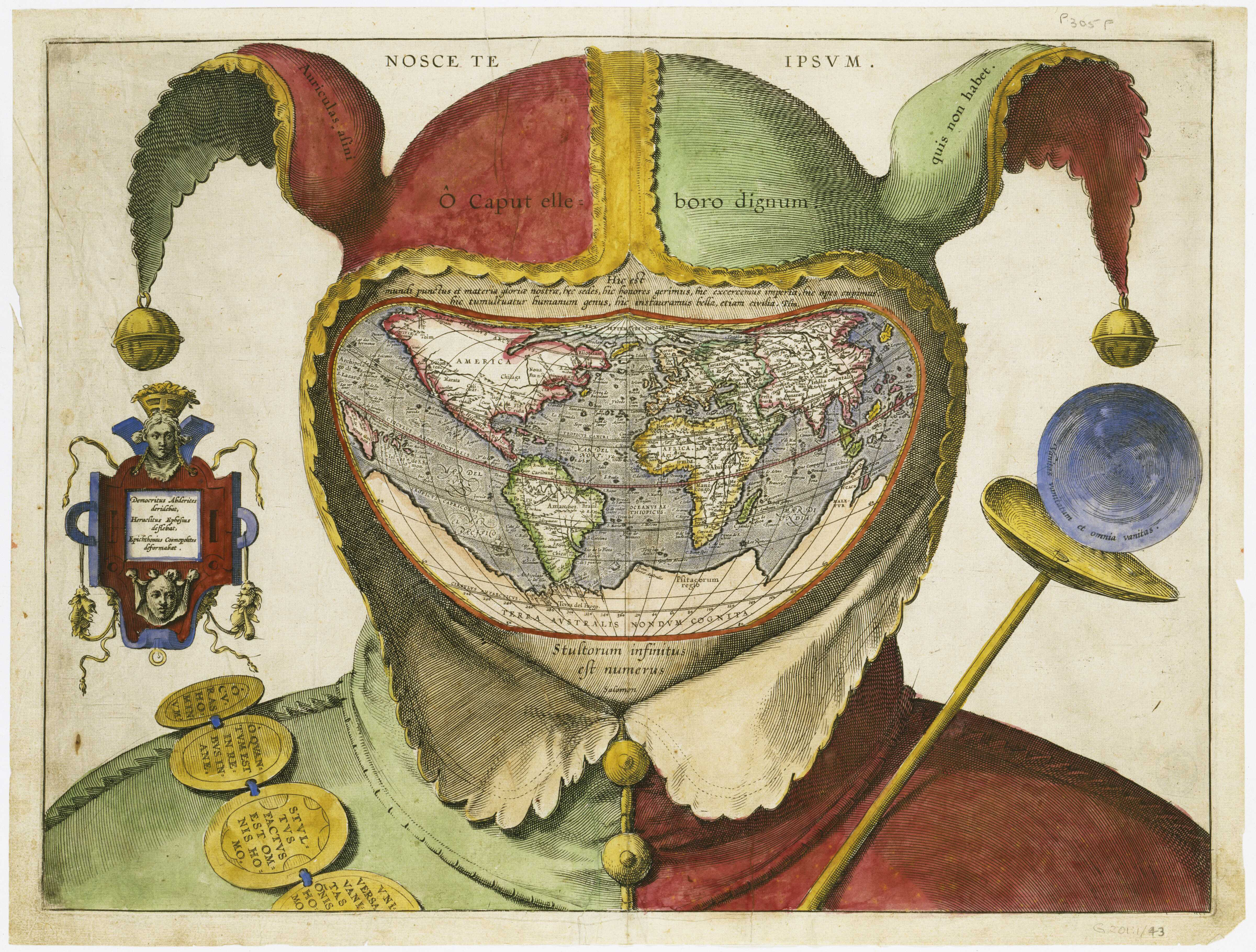
Fool's Cap Map of the World (circa 1580), presents a map of the world in the face of jester referencing the hubris of era to think that the map of world was a fully known and knowable subject.

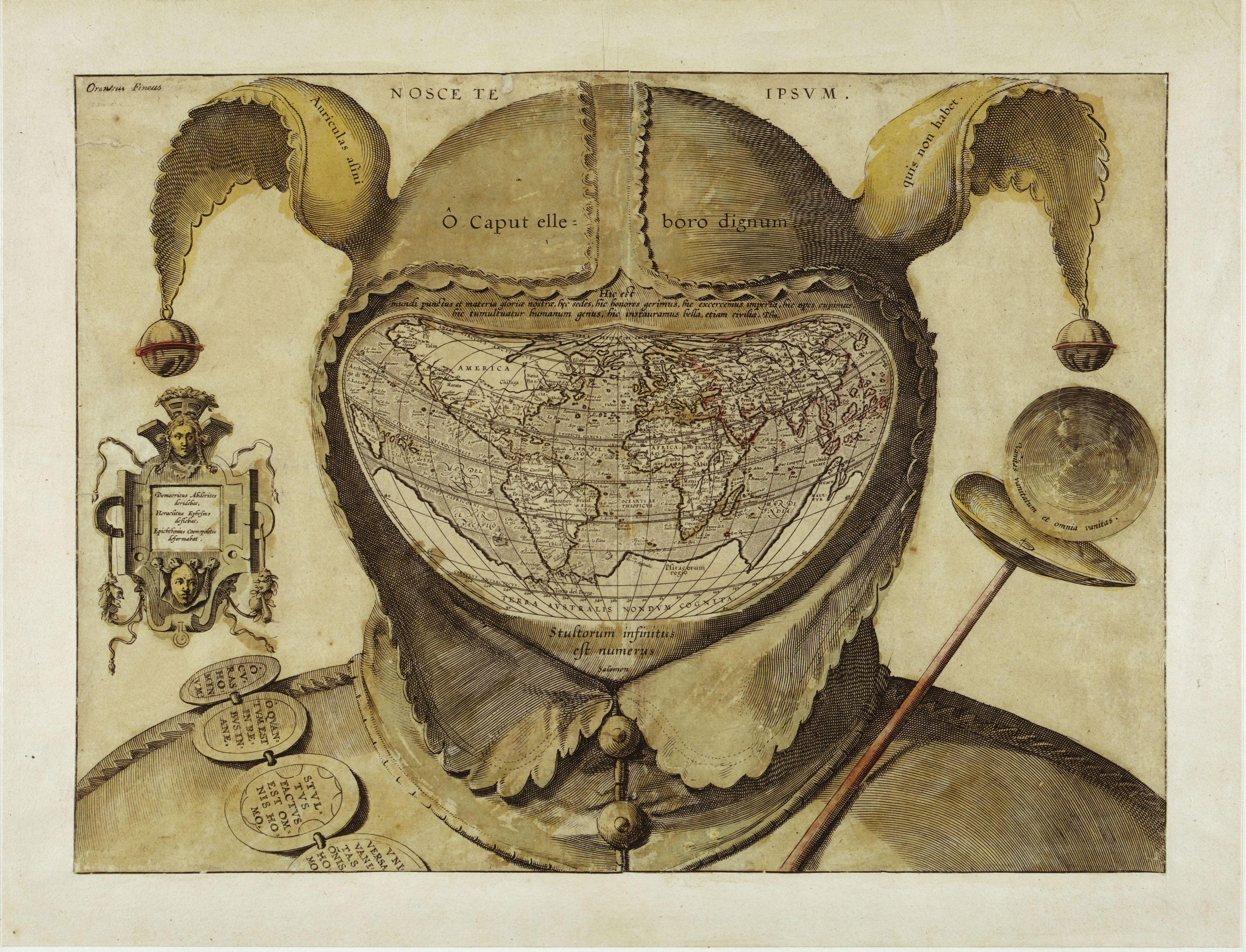

The Fool's Cap Map of the World is an artistic presentation of a world map created by an unknown artist sometime between 1580 and 1590 CE. The engraving takes the form of a court jester with the face replaced by cordiform (heart-shaped or leaf-shaped) world map based on the designs of cartographers such as Oronce Finé, Gerardus Mercator, and Abraham Ortelius.

The map featured in the artwork is based on Abraham Ortelius's Theatrum Orbis Terrarum ("Theatre of the Lands of the World"), which is one of the most referenced world maps in history. It also appears to draw inspiration from a foolscap map created in 1575 by the French mapmaker Jean de Fourmont. There is wide speculation that it was created by members of a Christian sect called the Familists, which valued global viewpoints while stressing the importance of self-reflection. In the left-hand corner, the name Orontius Fineus is inscribed, which is Latinized for Oronce Finé, a French mathematician and cartographer who died in 1555. Because Fool's Cap was published so long after Finé's death, the inscription is not thought to represent him as the artist but rather the subject of the work's ridicule.

The late sixteenth century was the height of Europe's Age of Discovery, which was a period in world history when previously isolated parts of the world became connected to form the world system and laid the groundwork for globalization. Fool's Cap Map of the World appears to be a commentary on the foolishness of people at the time to think that they had the world figured out. The picture also has elements of a vanitas work of art, reminding viewers of their limitations. It features multiple quotes in Latin to illustrate the key themes of the painting. The fool holds a sceptre that reads (translated) "Vanity of vanities, all is vanity," from Ecclesiastes. The cap is emblazoned with, "O head, worthy of a dose of hellebore." Hellebore is a poisonous flower that was used at the time to treat madness. The ears of the cap feature a quote from the Roman philosopher Lucius Annaeus Cornutus that reads, "Who doesn't have donkey's ears?"
