= Hyperbaton =

Figure of speech

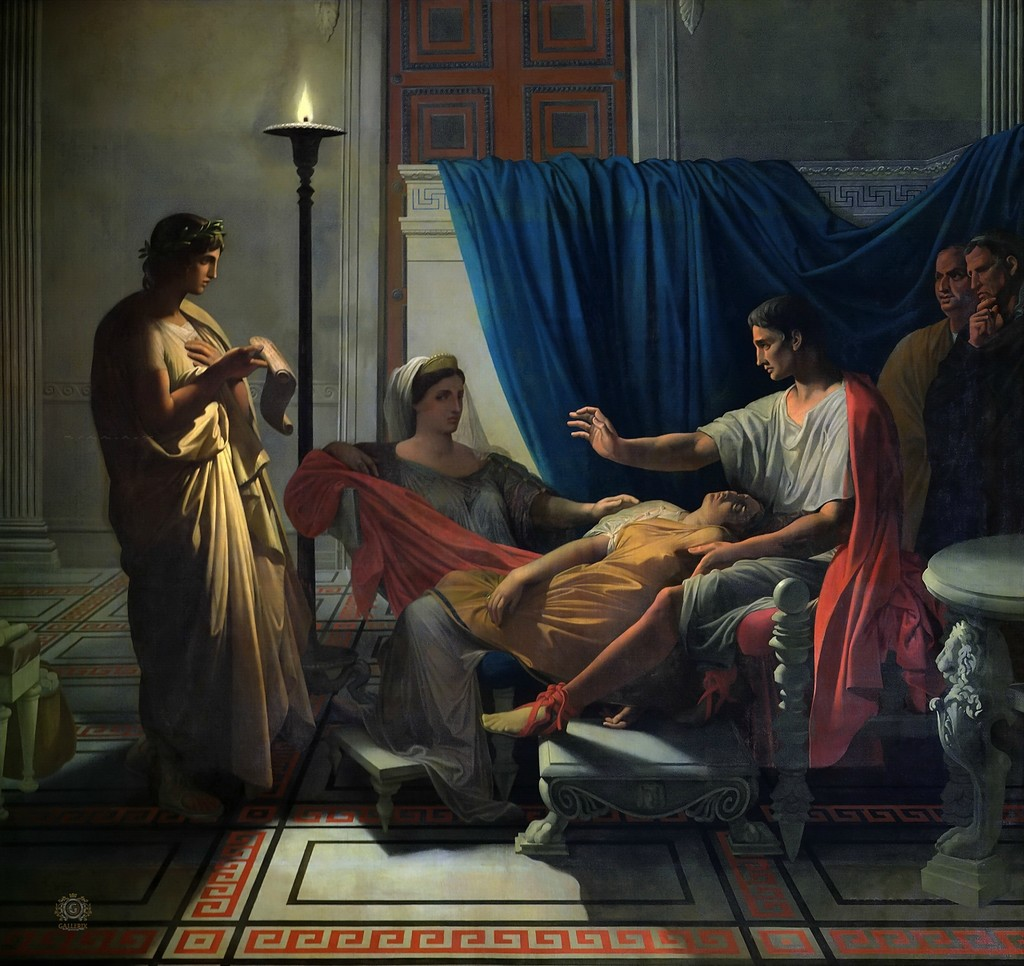
Jean-Auguste-Dominique Ingres, Virgil reading The Aeneid before Augustus, Livia and Octavia (1812); Virgil's Aeneid's famed opening lines—"Arma virumque cano, Troiæ qui primus ab oris" or "I sing of arms and the man, who first from the shores of Troy—" is a anastrophic hyperbaton: Troiæ prefaces the second clauses instead of being paired with its head word (oris).

Hyperbaton /haɪˈpɜːrbətɒn/, in its original meaning, is a figure of speech in which a phrase is made discontinuous by the insertion of other words. In modern usage, the term is also used more generally for figures of speech that transpose sentences' natural word order, which is also called anastrophe. Anastrophe is a hyponym of the antimetabole, where anastrophe only transposes one word in a sentence.

== Etymology ==
The word is borrowed from the Greek hyperbaton (ὑπέρβατον), meaning "stepping over", which is derived from hyper ("over") and bainein ("to step"), with the -tos verbal adjective suffix. The idea is that to understand the phrase, the reader has to "step over" the words inserted in between.

Anastrophe is from the Greek: ἀναστροφή, anastrophē, "a turning back or about".

== Classical usage ==
The separation of connected words for emphasis or effect is possible to a much greater degree in highly inflected languages, whose sentence meaning does not depend closely on word order, unlike languages like English with highly-strict word order. In Latin and Ancient Greek, the effect of hyperbaton is often to emphasize the first word. It has been called "perhaps the most distinctively alien feature of Latin word order." Donatus, in his work On tropes, includes under hyperbaton five varieties: hysterologia, anastrophe (for which the term hyperbaton is sometimes used loosely as a synonym), parenthesis, tmesis, and synchysis.

=== Ancient Greek ===
- ὑφ' ἑνὸς τοιαῦτα πέπονθεν ἡ Ἑλλὰς ἀνθρώπου (huph' henòs toiaûta péponthen hē Hellàs anthrṓpou) (Demosthenes 18.158)

"Greece has suffered such things at the hands of only one person"

In the above example, the word "(only) one", henos, occurs in its normal place after the preposition "at the hands of" (hupo), but "person" (anthrōpou) is unnaturally delayed, giving emphasis to "only one."

- πρός σε γονάτων (prós se gonátōn) (occurs several times in Euripides)

"[I entreat] you by your knees"

Here the word "you" (se) divides the preposition "by" from its object "knees".

- τίνα ἔχει δύναμιν; (tína ékhei dúnamin?) (Plato, Republic 358b)

"What power does it have?"

=== New Testament Greek ===
Hyperbaton is also common in New Testament Greek, for example:

οὗτος ὁ ἄνθρωπος πολλὰ ποιεῖ σημεῖα
hoûtos ho ánthrōpos pollà poieî sēmeîa
"This man is performing many signs" (not merely a few)

διὰ τὸ ἐγγὺς εἶναι Ἰερουσαλὴμ αὐτόν
dià tò engùs eînai Ierousalḕm autón
"because of him being near Jerusalem" (not far)

ἴδετε πηλίκοις ὑμῖν γράμμασιν ἔγραψα τῇ ἐμῇ χειρί
ídete pēlíkois humîn grámmasin égrapsa têi emêi kheirí
"See, I have written to you with big letters in my own hand" (not small ones)

ταλαίπωρος ἐγὼ ἄνθρωπος
talaípōros egṑ ánthrōpos
"I (am) a wretched man" (not a fortunate one)

In all these examples and others in the New Testament, the first word of the hyperbaton is an adjective or adverb which is emphasised by being separated from the following noun. The separating word can be a verb, noun, or pronoun.

=== Latin ===
==== Prose ====
In Latin hyperbaton is frequently found in both prose and verse. The following examples come from prose writers. Often, there is an implied contrast between the first word of the hyperbaton and its opposite:

- meo tu epistulam dedisti servo? (Plautus, Pseudolus 1203)

"You gave the letter to my slave (i.e. not your own)?"

- duas a te accepi epistulas heri (Cicero, Att., 14.2.1)

"I received two letters (duas epistulas) from you yesterday" (not just one).

- hae permanserunt aquae dies complures. (Caesar, B.C. 1.50.1):

"This flood (hae aquae) lasted (permanserunt) several days" (unlike the earlier one).

- ille sic dies (Cicero, Att. 5.1.3)

"So (passed) that day (ille dies)"

In all the above examples, the first word of the hyperbaton can be said to be emphasised. The following is different, since the emphasis seems to be on the word in the middle:

- sum enim ipse mensus (Cicero, ad Quintum fratrem, 3.1.4)

"for I measured (sum mensus) it myself (ipse)"

In the following an adjective of size is brought to the front, emphasising the whole phrase:

- pro ingenti itaque victoria id fuit plebi. (Livy 4.54.6)

"The people saw this, therefore, as an enormous victory."

- magnam enim secum pecuniam portabat (Nepos, Hannibal, 9.2)

"for (enim) he was carrying a large sum of money (magnam pecuniam) with him (secum)".

- magno cum fremitu et clamore (Cicero, to Atticus, 2.19.2)

"with (cum) a great deal of roaring and shouting"

The first word of the hyperbaton can also be an adverb, as in the following example:

- aeque vita iucunda (Cicero, de Finibus 4.30)

"a life (vita) equally pleasant (aeque iucunda).

It is also possible for the noun to come first ("postmodifier hyperbaton"), as in the following:

- dies appetebat septimus (Caesar, B.G. 6.35.1)

"The seventh day was approaching"

- Antonius legiones eduxit duas. (Cicero, ad Fam. 10.30.1)

"Antonius led out two legions."

A hyperbaton can also be used to demonstrate a kind of picture shown in the text:

- hac in utramque partem disputatione habita (Caesar, Bel. Gall. 5.30)

"With this dispute having been held favouring either side" (showing the dispute being on either side of the accusative prepositional phrase)

Another kind of hyperbaton is "genitive hyperbaton" in which one of the words is in the genitive case:

- contionem advocat militum (Caesar, Bellum Civile 2.32)

"He called a meeting of the soldiers."

The following even have a double hyperbaton:

- cum ipse litteram Socrates nullam reliquisset. (Cicero, de Orat. 3.60)

"When Socrates himself didn't leave a single line of writing."

- unam esse in celeritate positam salutem (Caesar, Bell. Gall. 5.29.7)

"their one (hope of) salvation rested in speed (celeritate)" (with emphasis on one and speed)

- praeda potitus ingenti est (Livy 40.49.1)

"he took possession of an enormous amount of booty".

In the following, a genitive hyperbaton and an adjectival hyperbaton are interleaved:

- magnus omnium incessit timor animis (Caesar Bellum Civile 2.29)

"Great fear (magnus timor) overcame the minds of all of them (omnium animis)."

Another kind of hyperbaton (called "conjunct hyperbaton" by Devine and Stephens) is found when a phrase consisting of two words joined by et ("and") is separated by another word:

- Aspendus, vetus oppidum et nobile (Cicero, Verr. 2.1.53)

"Aspendus, an old town, and a noble one".

- Faesulas inter Arretiumque (Livy, 22.3.3)

"Between Faesulae and Arretium".

==== Poetry ====
In poetry, especially poetry from the 1st century BC onwards, hyperbaton is very common; some 40% of Horace's adjectives are separated from their nouns.

Frequently two hyperbata are used in the same sentence, as in the following example:

- quam Catullus unam/ plus quam se atque suos amavit omnes (Catullus 58a)

"whom alone (quam unam) Catullus loved (amavit) more than himself and all his own (suos omnes)."

Often two noun phrases are interleaved in a double hyperbaton:

- saevae memorem Iunonis ob iram (Virgil, Aeneid, 1.5)

"on account of the mindful anger (memorem iram) of cruel Juno (saevae Iunonis)".

The type in the examples below, where two adjectives are followed by a verb and then two nouns in the same order as the adjectives, is often referred to as a "golden line":

- lurida terribiles miscent aconita novercae (Ovid, Metamorphoses, 1.147)

"Fearsome stepmothers (terribiles novercae) mix lurid aconites (lurida aconita)."

- irrita ventosae linquens promissa procellae (Catullus 64.55)

"abandoning his useless promises (irrita promissa) to the windy storm (ventosae procellae)"

Occasionally (but rarely) three separate noun phrases can be interleaved, for example:

- nullum Martia summo / altius imperium consule Roma videt (Ovid, Ex Ponto 4.9.65–6.)

"Martial Rome (Martia Roma) sees no higher command (nullum altius imperium) than supreme Consul (summo consule)"

In the following line, a conjunct hyperbaton is interleaved with another noun phrase:

venator cursu canis et latratibus instat (Virgil, Aeneid 12.751)
"the hunting dog (venator canis) threatens him with running and barking (cursu et latratibus)."

In other cases one hyperbaton is inserted inside another:

- in nova fert animus mutatas dicere formas / corpora (Ovid, Metamorphoses 1.1)

"My spirit leads me to tell of forms transformed (mutatas formas) into new bodies (nova corpora)."

- ab Hyrcanis Indoque a litore silvis (Lucan 8.343)

"from the Hyrcanian forests (Hyrcanis silvis) and from the Indian shore (Indo litore)."

The following example is from Ovid's Metamorphoses. Here the clause quae duri colerent iuvenci "which patient bullocks might cultivate", which already contains a hyperbaton of the phrase duri iuvenci "patient bullocks", is in turn is split up by the words pater arva:

non mihi quae duri colerent pater arva iuvenci ... reliquit (Ovid, Met. 3.584)
"My father did not leave me any fields (arva) which patient bullocks (duri iuvenci) might cultivate"

In some cases, the placing of two adjectives together may highlight a contrast between them, for example, in the following sentence from Horace, where the fragility of the boat is contrasted with the roughness of the sea:

- qui fragilem truci commisit pelago ratem (Horace, Odes, 1.3.10f)

"who committed a fragile boat (fragilem ratem) to the rough sea (truci pelago)"

Similarly in the example from Ovid below "transparent" is contrasted with "dense":

- et liquidum spisso secrevit ab aere caelum (Ovid, Metamorphoses 1.23)

"and He separated the transparent heaven (liquidum caelum) from the dense atmosphere (spisso aere)."

Sometimes pretty effects are obtained by apparently switching the order of the adjectives:

gratia sic minimo magna labore venit (Ovid, Amores, 3.4.46)
"thus great influence (gratia magna) comes with very little labour (minimo labore)"

Usually the adjective in a discontinuous noun phrase comes first, as in the above examples, but the opposite is also possible:

- cristāque tegit galea aurea rubrā (Virgil, Aeneid 9.50)

"And a golden helmet with a red crest (crista rubra) covers him."

- silva lupus in Sabina (Horace, Odes, 1.22)

"a wolf (lupus) (lurking) in the Sabine forest (silva Sabina)."

The above example illustrates another occasional feature of hyperbaton, since the word "wolf" (lupus) is actually inside the phrase "Sabine forest" (silva Sabina). This kind of word-play is found elsewhere in Horace also, e.g. grato, Pyrrha, sub antro "Pyrrha, beneath a pleasant grotto", where Pyrrha is indeed in a grotto; and in the quotation from Horace Odes 1.5 below, the girl is surrounded by the graceful boy, who in turn is surrounded by a profusion of roses:

- quis multa gracilis te puer in rosa (Horace, Odes, 1.5)

"what graceful boy (gracilis puer) (is embracing) you (te) amidst many a rose (multa rosa)?"

In Ovid, hyperbaton or dislocated word order is particularly common in his elegiac poetry. Kenney quotes the following. Here the words timebam ne caperer "I was afraid lest I might be captured", which are already dislocated into caperer ne timebam, are interleaved with the phrase si progressa forem nocte "if I had gone out in the night":

- si progressa forem caperer ne nocte timebam (Ovid, Her. 3.19)

"If I had gone out (progressa forem) at night (nocte), I was afraid I might be captured"

Housman comments: "the dislocation of nocte together with its juxtaposition with timebam lends emphasis to [Briseis's] fears of getting lost in the dark."

Anastrophe is common in Latin poetry, such as in the first line of the Aeneid:

Arma virumque cano, Troiæ qui primus ab oris

("I sing of arms and the man, who first from the shores of Troy")

In the example, the genitive case noun Troiæ ("of Troy") has been separated from the noun that it governs (oris, "shores") in a way that would be rather unusual in Latin prose. In fact, the liberty of Latin word order allows "of Troy" to be taken to modify "arms" or "the man" but is not customarily interpreted so.

=== Other languages ===
The classical type of hyperbaton is also found in Slavic languages like Polish:

Piękny Markowi kupili obraz
beautiful {for Mark} {they bought} painting
"They bought a beautiful painting for Mark."

Certain conditions are necessary for hyperbaton to be possible in Polish: discontinuous noun phrases typically contain just one modifier, and the noun and modifier must be separated by a verb (and not, for example, by the indirect object Markowi alone).

Similar constructions are found in other languages, such as Russian, Latvian, and Modern Greek from which the following example comes:

Το κόκκινο είδα το φόρεμα.
To kókkino eída to phórema.
"It is the red dress (το κόκκινο φόρεμα) that I saw."

Ntelitheos (2004) points out that one condition enabling such constructions is that the adjective is in contrastive focus ("the red dress, not the blue one").

== English usage ==
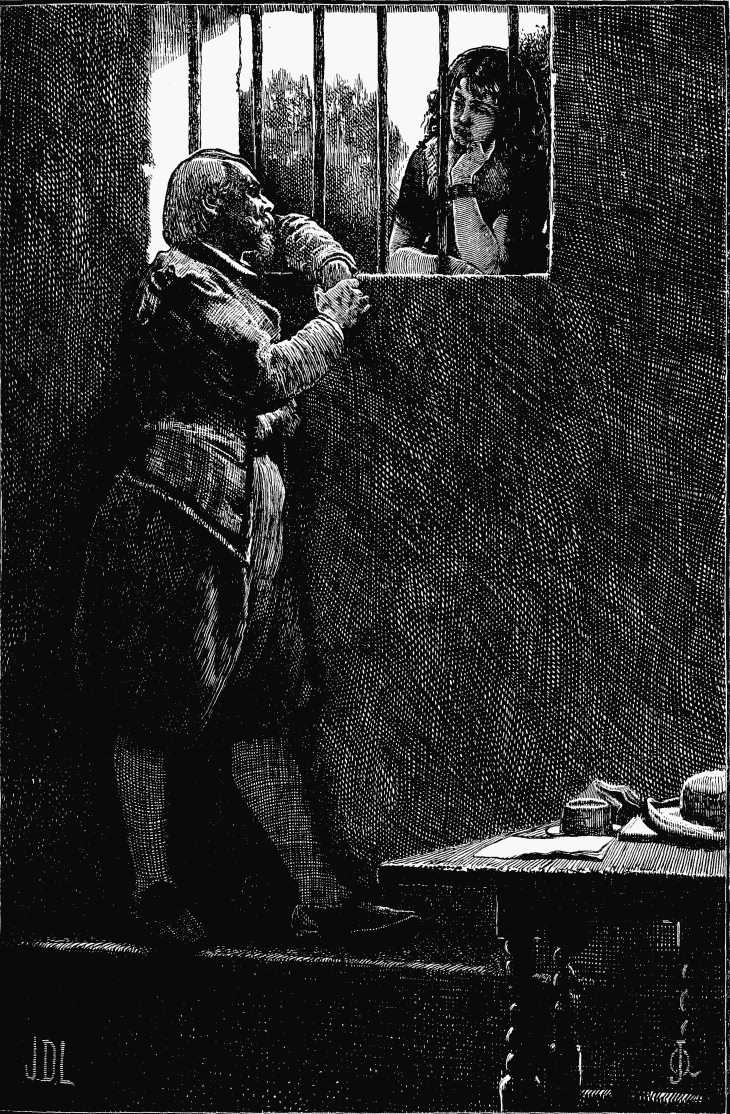
The above painting depicts Richard Lovelace in Gatehouse Prison where he wrote "To Althea, from Prison" with the hyperbaton "Stone walls do not a prison make, / Nor iron bars a cage."

While less common in English, hyperbata are still used and are defined as a purposeful inversion or transposition of dogmatic word order. Hyperbata are often closely associated with or considered a type of or synonymous with inversions: the metathesis of two elements switch their placements.

A common types of hyperbaton include placing the adjective after the noun it modifies: for example, "the forest burned with a fire unquenchable;" or delay the verb to the end of the sentence: thus Milton's phrase "who disobeys him, disobeys me" becomes "him who disobeys, me disobeys."

Hyperbaton is often used for the purpose of emphasis. The effectiveness of hyperbaton— though he defines hyperbaton as involving appending information to an already-complete sentence, such as in W. H. Auden's opening to "Musée des Beaux Arts:" "About suffering they were never wrong, / The Old masters—" derives from the spontaneity of adding truth to an already closed statement. Additionally, the relocation of phrases to the beginning or end of a sentence increases their importance as those positions in a sentence draw greater emphasis.

Occasionally, devices such as parenthesis (the insertion of a phrase that interrupts the sentence's normal syntax) and apposition (placing an explanative or modifying element directly after another element; such as in Luke 3:2: "John, son of Zechariah") are considered as hyponyms of hyperbata.

=== Examples ===
The following are examples of hyperbaton in which the author intentionally edited word order (opposed to the grammar becoming archaic):

- "Stone walls do not a prison make, / Nor iron bars a cage" — Richard Lovelace, "To Althea, From Prison"
- "Object there was none. Passion there was none." — Edgar Allan Poe, The Tell-Tale Heart.
- "The helmsman steered, the ship moved on; / Yet never a breeze up blew" — Samuel Taylor Coleridge, The Rime of the Ancient Mariner
- "For while the tired waves, vainly breaking, / Seem here no painful inch to gain" — Arthur Hugh Clough, Say Not the Struggle Naught Availeth.
- "Backward ran sentences until reeled the mind." — Wolcott Gibbs's 1936 parody of Time magazine.
- "Alone with Christ, desolate else, left by mankind." — Lionel Johnson, The Church of a Dream (1890)

==== Anastrophe examples ====
Subject–verb–object ("I like potatoes") might be changed to object–subject–verb ("potatoes I like").

Because English has a settled natural word order, anastrophe emphasizes the displaced word or phrase. For example, the name of the City Beautiful urbanist movement emphasises "beautiful". Similarly, in "This is the forest primeval", from Henry Wadsworth Longfellow's Evangeline, the emphasis is on "primeval".

If the emphasis that comes from anastrophe is not an issue, the synonym inversion is perfectly suitable.

Anastrophe also occurs in English poetry, as in the third verse of Samuel Taylor Coleridge's The Rime of the Ancient Mariner:

He holds him with his skinny hand,

"There was a ship," quoth he.

"Hold off! unhand me, grey-beard loon!"

Eftsoons his hand dropt he.

The word order of "his hand dropt he" is not the customary word order in English, even in the archaic English that Coleridge seeks to imitate. Also, excessive use of the device if the emphasis is unnecessary or even unintended, especially for the sake of rhyme or metre, is usually considered a flaw, such as the clumsy versification of Sternhold and Hopkins's metrical psalter:

The earth is all the Lord's, with all

her store and furniture;

Yea, his is all the work, and all

that therein doth endure:

For he hath fastly founded it

above the seas to stand,

And placed below the liquid floods,

to flow beneath the land.

However, some poets have a style that depends on heavy use of anastrophe. Gerard Manley Hopkins is particularly identified with the device, which renders his poetry susceptible to parody:

Hope holds to Christ the mind's own mirror out
To take His lovely likeness more and more.

When anastrophe draws an adverb to the head of a thought, such as for emphasis, the verb is drawn along. That causes a verb-subject inversion:

"Never have I found the limits of the photographic potential. Every horizon, upon being reached, reveals another beckoning in the distance" (W. Eugene Smith).

In Robert Frost's "Mending Wall," the poem's opening clause begins with an object noun, and yet this inversion does not occur, effectively creating a tension that is worked against through the rest of the poem:

"Something there is that doesn't love a wall..."

A popular cultural example of anastrophe would be Yoda from the Star Wars series. “Powerful you have become, the dark side I sense in you.”

== See also ==
- Apposition
- Figure of speech
- Golden line
- Parenthesis
- Split infinitive
- Epiphrase
- Scrambling (linguistics)

== Bibliography ==
- Aubrey, Mike. Discontinuous Syntax in the New Testament part 3.
- Devine, Andrew M. & Laurence D. Stephens (1999), Discontinuous Syntax: Hyperbaton in Greek. Oxford University Press. Review by M.C. Beckwith.
- Devine, Andrew M. & Laurence D. Stephens (2006), Latin Word Order. Structured Meaning and Information. Oxford: Oxford University Press. Pp. xii, 639. ISBN 0-19-518168-9: Ch. 7 "Hyperbaton", pp. 524–610.
- Kenney, E. J. (2002). "Ovid's language and style". In Brill's Companion to Ovid (pp. 27-89). Brill.
- Nisbet, R. G. M. (1999). "The Word-Order of Horace's Odes". Proceedings of the British Academy, 93, 135-154.
- Ntelitheos, Dimitrios (2004). Syntax of Elliptical and Discontinuous Nominals. University of California, Los Angeles, M.A. thesis.
- Powell, J. G. (2010) "Hyperbaton and register in Cicero", in E. Dickey and A. Chahoud (eds.), Colloquial and Literary Latin, Cambridge: Cambridge University Press, 163–185.
- Siewierska, A. (1984). "Phrasal Discontinuity in Polish", Australian Journal of Linguistics 4, 57–71.
- Smyth, Herbert Weir (1920). Greek Grammar. Cambridge MA: Harvard University Press. pp. 673–674. ISBN 0-674-36250-0.
- Spevak, Olga (2010). Constituent Order in Classical Latin Prose. Studies in Language Companion Series (SLCS) 117. Amsterdam/Philadelphia: John Benjamins Publishing Company, 2010. Pp. xv, 318. ISBN 9789027205841: pp. 23–26.
