= Comminianus =

Latin grammarian

Comminianus (also referred to as Cominianus or Comminian) was a Latin grammarian of the late fourth century. His writings no longer exist and he is only known through the Ars grammatica of Charisius. He is the final author mentioned in Alcuin's poetic recounting of the Latin authors contained in his library at York Minster.
