= Remmius Palaemon =

1st century AD Roman grammarian

Quintus Remmius Palaemon or Quintus Rhemnius Fannius Palaemon was a Roman grammarian and a native of Vicentia. He lived during the reigns of Emperors Tiberius and Claudius.

== Life ==
From Suetonius, we learn that he was originally a slave who obtained his freedom and taught grammar at Rome. Suetonius preserves several anecdotes of his profligate and arrogant character. He was said to be so steeped in luxury that he bathed several times a day. Tiberius and Claudius both felt he was too dissolute to allow boys and young men to be entrusted to him. He referred to the great grammarian Varro as a "pig". However, he had a remarkable memory and wrote poetry in unusual meters, and he enjoyed a great reputation as a teacher; Quintilian and Persius are said to have been his pupils.

== Works ==
His lost Ars, a system of grammar much used in his own time and largely drawn upon by later grammarians, contained rules for correct diction, illustrative quotations and discussed barbarisms and solecisms. An extant Ars grammatica (discovered by Jovianus Pontanus in the 15th century) and other unimportant treatises on similar subjects have been wrongly ascribed to him.

Among Palaemon's ascribed works is a Song on Weights and Measures (Carmen de Ponderibus et Mensuris) now dated to between the late 4th and early 6th centuries. In this poem, first edited in 1528, the term gramma is used for a weight equal to two oboli. (Two oboli—a diobol—corresponds to 1/24th of a Roman ounce or about 1.14 grams.) This eventually led to the adoption of the term gram as a unit of weight (poids, later of mass) by the French National Convention in 1795.
