= Ars grammatica =

Generic title for surveys of Latin grammar

An ars grammatica (English: art of grammar) is a generic or proper title for surveys of Latin grammar. The first ars grammatica seems to have been composed by Remmius Palaemon (first century AD), but is now lost. The most famous ars grammatica since late antiquity has been that composed by Donatus and was one of the first experimental texts printed by Gutenberg.

== Donatus' Ars Grammatica ==
Two artes grammaticae circulate under the name Donatus. The first, the Ars Minor, is a brief overview of the eight parts of speech: noun, pronoun, verb, adverb, participle, conjunction, preposition, and interjection (nomen, pronomen, verbum, adverbium, participium, conjunctio, praepositio, interjectio). The text is presented entirely in a question-and-answer format (e.g. "How many numbers does a noun have?" "Two: singular and plural.").

Donatus' Ars Major is only a little longer, but on a much more elevated plane. It consists of a list of stylistic faults and graces, including tropes such as metaphor, synecdoche, allegory, and sarcasm. Donatus also includes schemes such as zeugma and anaphora.

== Diomedes' Ars Grammatica ==
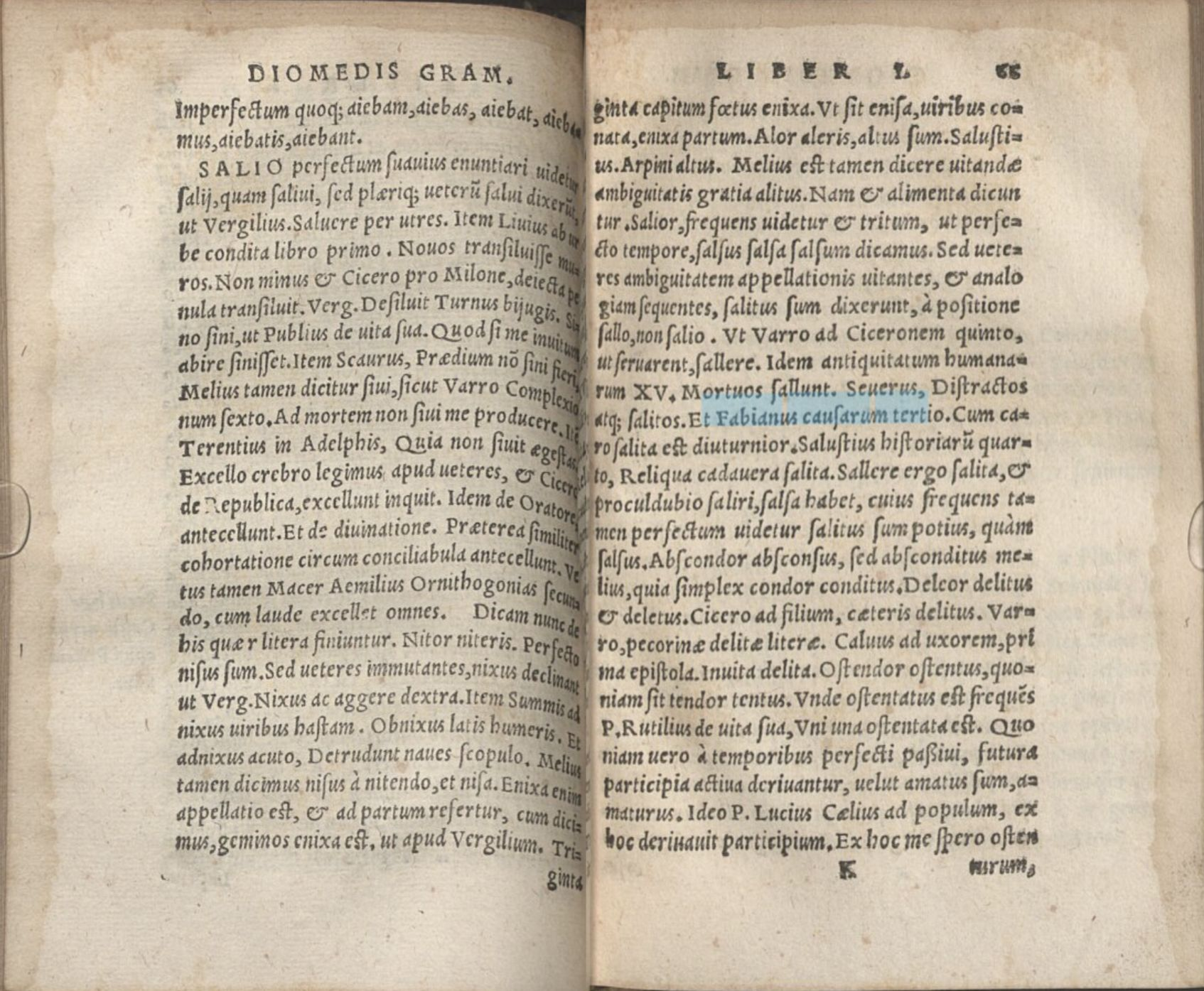
1542 edition of Diomedes' Ars grammatica

The Ars Grammatica or De Oratione et Partibus Orationis et Vario Genere Metrorum libri III by Diomedes Grammaticus is a Latin grammatical treatise. Diomedes probably wrote in the late 4th century AD. The treatise is dedicated to a certain Athanasius.

- Book I the eight parts of speech
- Book II the elementary ideas of grammar and of style
- Book III poetry, quantity, and meters

The third book on poetry is particularly valuable, containing extracts from Suetonius' De poetica. This book contains one of the most complete lists of types of dactylic hexameters in antiquity, including the teres versus, which may be the so-called golden line.

The Ars of Diomedes still exists in a complete form (although probably abridged). It was first published in a collection of Latin Grammarians printed at Venice by Nicolas Jenson in about 1476. The best edition of Diomedes's Ars Grammatica is in Grammatici Latini vol. I by Heinrich Keil.

== Alcuin's Ars Grammatica ==
In around the 790s, Alcuin of York composed an Ars grammatica as the first of a group of four opera didascalica ('educational works') in question-and-answer form rooted in Donatus's Ars grammatica. The other three texts were De orthographia, Ars rhetorica, and De dialectica. Alcuin's Ars grammatica begins with a section Disputatio de vera philosophia ('dialogue on true philosophy'). In the assessment of Rita Copeland and Ineke Sluiter, 'the content of these works is highly derivative, but the pedagogy is innovative, and the way in which the work of compilation has been executed gives a new ideological twist to traditional material'.

== Other works of ars grammatica ==
Other extant works of Ars grammatica have been written by

- Gaius Plinius Caecilius Secundus (first century)
- Charisius (fourth century)
- Gaius Marius Victorinus (fourth century)
- Maurus Servius Honoratus (fourth to fifth century)
- Pseudo-Remmius Palaemon
