= Caesius Bassus =

1st century Roman lyric poet

Gaius Caesius Bassus (d. AD 79) was a Roman lyric poet who lived in the reign of Nero.

He was the intimate friend of Persius, who dedicated his sixth satire to him, and whose works he edited (Schol. on Persius, vi. I). He had a great reputation as a poet; Quintilian (Instit. x. I. 96) went so far as to say that with the exception of Horace, he was the only lyric poet worth reading.

He is also identified with the author of a treatise De Metris of which considerable fragments, probably of an abbreviated edition, are extant (ed. Keil, 1885). The work was probably originally in verse, and afterwards recast or epitomized in prose form to be used as an instruction book. An account of some of the metres of Horace (in Keil, Grammatici Latini, vi. 305), bearing the title Ars Caesii Bassi de Metris is not by him but chiefly borrowed by its unknown author, from the treatise mentioned above.

He is said to have lost his life in the eruption of Vesuvius in AD 79.
