= Charisius =

4th-century Roman grammarian

Flavius Sosipater Charisius (fl. 4th century AD) was a Latin grammarian.

He was probably an African by birth, summoned to Constantinople to take the place of Euanthius, a learned commentator on Terence.

== Ars Grammatica ==
The Ars Grammatica, in five books, is addressed to his son (not a Roman, as the preface shows). The surviving text is incomplete: the beginning of the first, part of the fourth, and the greater part of the fifth book are lost.

The work, which is a compendium, is valuable as it contains excerpts from the earlier writers on grammar, who are in many cases mentioned by name: Remmius Palaemon, Julius Romanus (Gaius Iulius Romanus), Comminianus.

The edition of Heinrich Keil, in Grammatici Latini, i. (1857), has been superseded by that of Karl Barwick (1925).
