= Ilias Latina =

Latin hexameter poem

The Ilias Latina is a short Latin hexameter version of Homer's Iliad that gained popularity in antiquity and remained popular through the Middle Ages. It was very widely studied and read in Medieval schools as part of the standard Latin educational curriculum. According to Ernest Robert Curtius, it is a "crude condensation", the original 15,693 line poem being condensed into 1,070 lines. It is attributed to Publius Baebius Italicus, said to be a Roman senator, and is dated to the decade 60–70 CE. It includes at least two acrostic elements: the first lines (after emendation) spell out ITALICUS, while the last lines spell SCRIPSIT, which taken together translate to "Italicus wrote (it)."
