= Parenthetical phrase =

Grammatically optional part inserted into a passage

In rhetoric, a parenthesis (pl.: parentheses) (Note: from the Ancient Greek word παρένθεσις parénthesis 'injection, insertion', literally '(a) putting in beside') or parenthetical phrase is an explanatory or qualifying word, phrase, clause, or sentence inserted into a passage. The parenthesis could be left out and still form grammatically correct text. Parenthetical expressions are usually delimited by round brackets (also known as parentheses), square brackets, dashes, or commas. English-language style and usage guides originating in the news industry of the twentieth century, such as the AP Stylebook, recommend against the use of square brackets for parenthesis and other purposes, because "They cannot be transmitted over news wires." Usage of parentheses goes back (at least) to the 15th century in English legal documents.

== Examples ==
Billy-bob, a great singer, was not a good dancer.
The phrase a great singer, set off by commas, is both an appositive and a parenthesis.
A dog (not a cat) is an animal that barks.
The phrase not a cat is a parenthesis.
My umbrella (which is somewhat broken) can still shield the two of us from the rain.
The phrase which is somewhat broken is a parenthesis.
Please, Gerald, come here!
Gerald is both a noun of address and a parenthesis.
People who eat broccoli are typically healthier—and happier—than people who don't.
The phrase and happier, set off by dashes, is a parenthesis.

== Types ==
The following are examples of types of parenthetical phrases. Within each example sentence, the parenthetical phrase is displayed in italics.

- Introductory phrase: Once upon a time, my father ate a muffin.
- Interjection: My father ate the muffin, gosh damn it!
- Aside: My father, if you don't mind me telling you this, ate the muffin.
- Appositive: My father, a jaded and bitter man, ate the muffin.
- Absolute phrase: My father, his eyes flashing with rage, ate the muffin.
- Free modifier: My father, chewing with unbridled fury, ate the muffin.
- Resumptive modifier: My father ate the muffin, a muffin which no man had yet chewed.
- Summative modifier: My father ate the muffin, a feat which no man had attempted.
