= Persius =

Roman poet and satirist (AD 34–62)

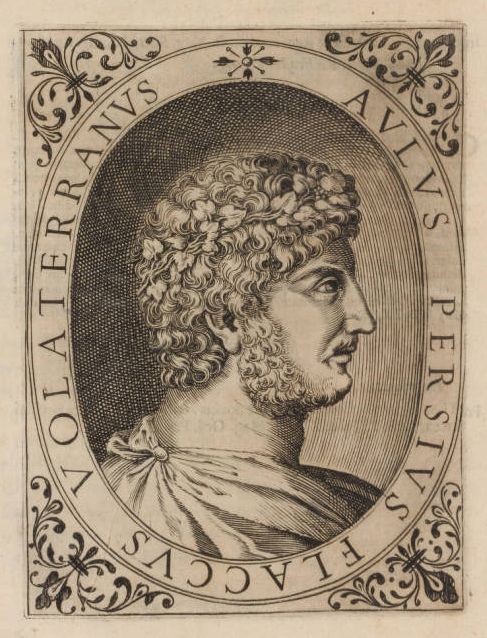
Persius as depicted in the 1630 Italian translation of his works by Francesco Stelluti

Aulus Persius Flaccus (/ˈpɜːrʃiəs, ˈpɜːrʃəs/; 4 December 34 – 24 November 62 AD) was a Roman poet and satirist of Etruscan origin. In his works, poems and satire, he shows a Stoic wisdom and a strong criticism for what he considered to be the stylistic abuses of his poetic contemporaries. His works, which became very popular in the Middle Ages, were published after his death by his friend and mentor, the Stoic philosopher Lucius Annaeus Cornutus.

== Life ==
According to the Life contained in the manuscripts, Persius was born into an equestrian family at Volterra (Volaterrae, in Latin), a small Etruscan city in the province of Pisa, of good stock on both parents' side. When he was six years old he lost his father; his stepfather died a few years later. At the age of twelve Persius came to Rome, where he was taught by Remmius Palaemon and the rhetor Verginius Flavus. During the next four years he developed friendships with the Stoic Lucius Annaeus Cornutus, the lyric poet Caesius Bassus and the poet Lucan. Lucan would become a generous admirer of all Persius wrote. He also became close friends with Thrasea Paetus, the husband of Arria, a relative of Persius's; over the next ten years Persius and Thrasea Paetus shared many travels together. Later, he met Seneca, but was not impressed by his genius.

In his boyhood, Persius wrote a tragedy dealing with an episode in Roman history, and another work, probably on travel (although this would have been before the travels with Thrasea Paetus). Reading the satires of Lucilius made Persius want to write like him, and he set to work on a book of his own satires. But he wrote seldom and slowly; a premature death (uitio stomachi) prevented him from completing the book. He has been described as having "a gentle disposition, girlish modesty and personal beauty", and is said to have lived a life of exemplary devotion towards his mother Fulvia Sisennia, his sister and his aunt. To his mother and sister he left his considerable fortune. Cornutus suppressed all his work except the satires, to which he made some slight alterations before handing it over to Bassus for editing. It proved an immediate success.

=== Doubts over his biography ===
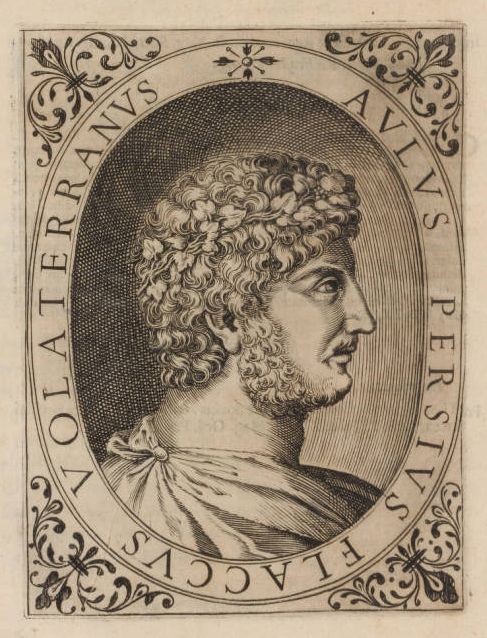

The scholia add a few details—on what authority is, as generally with such sources, very doubtful. The Life itself, though not free from the suspicion of interpolation and undoubtedly corrupt and disordered in places, is probably trustworthy. The manuscripts say it came from the commentary of Valerius Probus, no doubt a learned edition of Persius like those of Virgil and Horace by this same famous "grammarian" of Berytus, the poet's contemporary. The only case in which it seems to conflict with the Satires (Saturae) themselves is in its statement as to the death of Persius's father. The declaiming of a suasoria in his presence (Sat. 3.4 sqq.) implies a more mature age than that of six in the performer. But pater might here mean "stepfather," or Persius may have forgotten his own autobiography, may be simply reproducing one of his models. The mere fact that the Life and the Satires agree so closely does not of course prove the authenticity of the former. One of the points of harmony is, however, too subtle for us to believe that a forger evolved it from the works of Persius: the Life gives the impression of a "bookish" youth, who never strayed far from home and family. This is also the picture drawn by the Satires; many of the characters that Persius creates have the same names as characters found in Horace.

A keen observer of what occurs within his narrow horizon, Persius did not shy away from describing the seamy side of life (cf. e.g. such hints as Sat. iii.110), especially the relationship between excesses of consumption and moral failure; he shows little of Horace's easy-going acceptance of human weaknesses. Perhaps the sensitive, homebred nature of Persius can also be glimpsed in his frequent references to ridicule, whether of great men by street gamins or of the cultured by philistines. Montaigne mentions Persius several times.

== Work ==
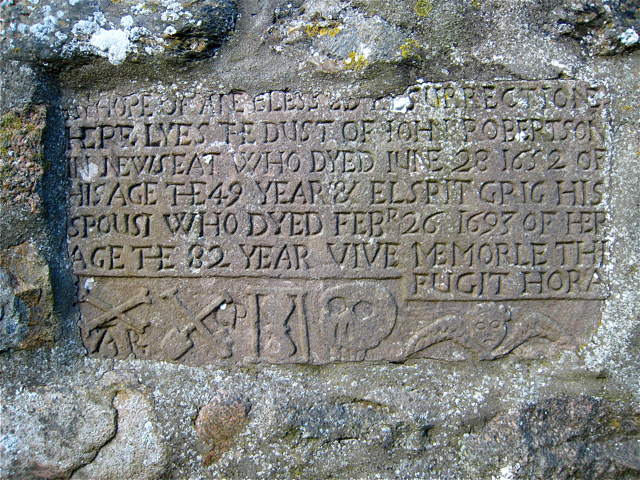
17th-century Scottish gravestone with a quote from Persius: Vive memor lethi fugit hora, "Live mindful of death, for time flies."

The chief interest of Persius's work lies in its relation to Roman satire in its interpretation of Roman Stoicism, and in its use of the Latin tongue. The influence of Horace on Persius can, in spite of the silence of the Life, hardly have been less than that of Lucilius. Not only characters, as noted above, but whole phrases, thoughts and situations come directly from him. The resemblance only emphasizes the difference between the caricaturist of Stoicism and its preacher. Persius strikes the highest note that Roman satire reached; in earnestness and moral purpose he rises far superior to the political rancour or good-natured persiflage of his predecessors and the rhetorical indignation of Juvenal. From him we learn how that philosophy could work on minds that still preserved the depth and purity of the old Roman gravitas. Some of the parallel passages in the works of Persius and Seneca are very close, and cannot be explained by assuming the use of a common source. Like Seneca, Persius censures the style of the day, and imitates it. Indeed, in some of its worst failings, straining of expression, excess of detail, exaggeration, he outbids Seneca, whilst the obscurity, which makes his little book of not seven hundred lines so difficult to read and is in no way due to great depth of thought, compares poorly with the terse clearness of the Epistolae morales. A curious contrast to this tendency is presented by his free use of "popular" words. As of Plato, so of Persius, we hear that he emulated Sophron; the authority is a late one (the Byzantine Lydus, De mag. I.41), but we can at least recognize in the scene that opens Sat. 3 kinship with such work as Theocritus' Adoniazusae and the Mimes of Herodas.

Persius's satires are composed in hexameters, except for the scazons of the short prologue above referred to. The first satire censures the literary tastes of the day as a reflection of the decadence of the national morals. The theme of Seneca's 114th letter is similar. The description of the recitator and the literary twaddlers after dinner is vividly natural, but an interesting passage which cites specimens of smooth versification and the languishing style is greatly spoiled by the difficulty of appreciating the points involved and indeed of distributing the dialogue (a not uncommon crux in Persius). The remaining satires handle in order (2) the question as to what we may justly ask of the gods (cf. Second Alcibiades), (3) the importance of having a definite aim in life, (4) the necessity of self-knowledge for public men (cf. Plato's First Alcibiades), (5) the Stoic doctrine of liberty (introduced by generous allusions to Cornutus' teaching), and (6) the proper use of money.

The Life tells us that the Satires were not left complete; some lines were taken (presumably by Cornutus or Bassus) from the end of the work so that it might be quasi finitus. This perhaps means that a sentence in which Persius had left a line imperfect, or a paragraph which he had not completed, had to be omitted. The same authority says that Cornutus definitely blacked out an offensive allusion to the emperor's literary taste, and that we owe to him the reading of the manuscripts in Sat. i.121,—"auriculas asini quis non (for Mida rex) habet!" Traces of lack of revision are, however, still visible; cf. e.g. v.176 (sudden transition from ambition to superstition) and vi.37 (where criticism of Greek doctores has nothing to do with the context). The parallels to passages of Horace and Seneca are recorded in the commentaries: in view of what the Life says about Lucan, the verbal resemblance of Sat. iii.3 to Phars. x.163 is interesting. Examples of bold language or metaphor: i.25, rupto iecore exierit caprificus, 60, linguae quantum sitiat canis; iii.42, intus palleat, 81, silentia rodunt; v.92, ueteres auiae de pulmone reuello. Passages like iii.87, 100 sqq. show elaboration carried beyond the rules of good taste. "Popular" words: baro, cerdo, ebullire, glutto, lallare, mamma, muttire, obba, palpo, scloppus. Fine lines, etc., in i.116 sqq., ii.6 sqq., 61 sqq., 73 sqq., iii.39 sqq.

=== Authorities ===
The manuscripts of Persius fall into two groups, one represented by two of the best of them, the other by that of Petrus Pithoeus, so important for the text of Juvenal. Since the publication of J. Bieger's de Persii cod. pith. recte aestimando (Berlin, 1890) the tendency has been to prefer the tradition of the latter.

The first important editions were: (1) with explanatory notes: Isaac Casaubon (Paris, 1605, enlarged edition by Johann Friedrich Dübner, Leipzig, 1833); Otto Jahn (with the scholia and valuable prolegomena, Leipzig, 1843); John Conington (with translation; 3rd ed., Oxford, 1893), etc.; but there are several modern editions.

== Editions ==
- Hemphill, Samuel (1901) The Satires of Persius. Hodges, Figgis & Co., Ltd.
- Braund, Susanna M. (2004) Juvenal and Persius. Loeb Classical Library. Harvard University Press.
