= Joannis Avramidis =

Greek-Austrian artist (1922–2016)

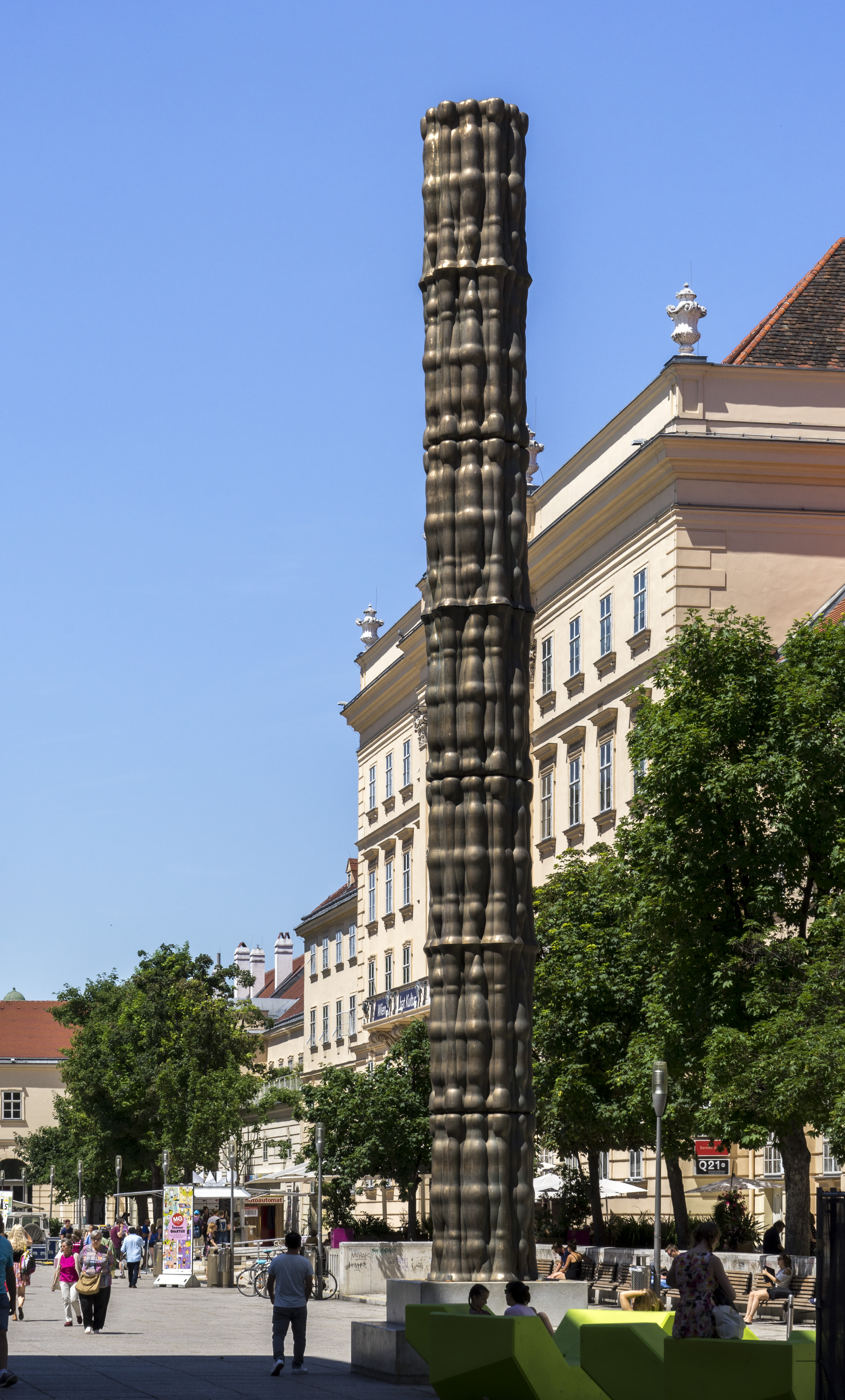
"Column of Humanity" (1993–1996) in Vienna, Austria

Joannis Avramidis (Greek: Iωάννης Aβραμίδης; born 23 September 1922, Batumi – 16 January 2016, Vienna) was a contemporary Greek-Austrian painter and sculptor. He was born in Batumi, on the Black Sea, in the Adjarian Autonomous Soviet Socialist Republic, an Autonomous Republic of the former Soviet Union (in present-day Georgia), to a family of Pontic Greeks, who had fled the repression of ethnic minorities in the Ottoman Empire in the turmoil leading up to the Greco-Turkish War.

== Life and career ==
He began studying painting at the State Art School of Batumi in 1937, the same year his father had violently died in prison as a victim of ethnic repression by Stalin's henchmen. Alas, his studies came to a premature end in 1939 when the whole family (i.e. his mother and her 4 children) had to re-emigrate again, this time to Greece, due to the USSR's sustained policy leading to ethnic cleansing. After living 4 difficult years in Greece, first in Athens and later in Northern Greece, he was conscripted in 1943, as a 21-year old, during the Axis occupation of Greece, and deported to Vienna, Austria, to work in forced labour at the train repair shop "Eisenbahnausbesswerungswerke Kledering" (Simmering district) maintaining railway vehicles for the National Socialist's regime.

Once the Second World War had come to an end, Avramidis was categorised as suspicious by the Soviet occupation authorities in Vienna due to his knowledge of Russian and deported to an internment camp near Budapest. However, he managed to escape and return to Vienna.

There Avramidis began studying painting as a regular student in the masterclass of Robin Christian Andersen (1890–1969), from 1945 till 1949, at the Academy of Fine Arts Vienna (in German: Akademie der bildenden Künste Wien). Fellow academy students were a.o. Ernst Fuchs, Erich (later called Arik) Brauer, Giselbert Hoke and Kurt Absolon.

Somewhat fortuitously, in 1953, having finished art school a couple of years earlier, his talents as a sculptor were discovered by Fritz Wotruba, which led him, at the age of 31, to attend Wotruba's sculpture classes at the same academy, from 1953 to 1956. Upon graduation in 1956, Avramidis received the Staatspreis der Akademie der Bildenden Künste in Wien, his first honorary award of many.

«Wotruba war ein Glücksfall für mich, dabei interessierte er mich eigentlich gar nicht als Lehrer. Außerdem hatte ich die Akademie schon verlassen. Aber dann kam ich mit einem Kopf an die Akademie, Wotruba holte sofort seine gesamte Schülerschaft.» (in German);

Translation :

«Wotruba was a stroke of luck for me, although I wasn't really interested in him as a teacher. Besides, I had already left the academy. But then I came to the academy with a head and Wotruba immediately brought in his entire student body.»

— Joannis Avramidis

Ten years later, he returned to his Alma mater to become a professor until his retirement in 1992 :

- 1965/66 : Head of the Class for Nude Drawing at the Academy of Fine Arts in Vienna, Austria
- 1966/67 : Visiting Professor at the Academy of Fine Arts, Hamburg, Germany
- 1968–1992 : Head of the Masterclass for Sculpture at the Academy of Fine Arts, Vienna, Austria.

At the academy he worked closely together with Heimo Kuchling, an art theorist who initiated and taught the subject "Morphology of the Fine Arts" (in German: Morphologie der Bildenden Kunst).

Avramidis was a member of the Wiener Secession.

In 1962 Avramidis made the acquaintance of Alberto Giacometti at the 31st Biennale in Venice, where he represented Austria together with Friedrich (who later called himself Friedensreich) Hundertwasser. His 22 sculptures were praised for their "quality and drama" by Giacometti, who had been awarded a grand solo show at the art event for which he received the Grand Prize for Sculpture that year.

Franco Russoli, a friend of Giacometti and director of the Pinacoteca di Brera in Milan, later expanded on this comment by recognising in the work of Avramidis "the constantly recurring image of loneliness, the search for a refuge in the embrace of people locked in their own inability to communicate".

Avramidis later participated in documenta III (1964) and documenta 6 (1977) in Kassel and enjoyed an important number of participations in exhibitions over the years, both solo or in group.

=== Private life ===
Joannis Avramidis was the son of the merchant, ship owner and flower grower Konstantin Avramidis and his wife Eleni, who had emigrated to the Russian Tsarist Empire in 1916 in order to escape the oppression of the Greek minority in the Ottoman Empire. His father Konstantin was a Black Sea Greek whose family had lived in Georgia for generations. Joannis Avramidis had three younger siblings: Georgette, Thomas and Sofia. From the late 1960s onwards, Thomas often helped with fabricating his brother's sculptures.

In 1952 Avramidis wed Waltraud Rathofer, a restoration expert, whom he divorced in 1955, the same year he officially became an Austrian citizen.

In 1962 he married a fellow art student, another pupil of Wotruba, Annemarie Avramidis née Persche (Vienna, 1939–2013). They had a daughter Julia Frank-Avramidis (* 1969), who is also a painter.

After the death in 2014 of his wife Annemarie, a poet and accomplished sculptor in her own right, he completely withdrew from public life, and during the night of January 16, 2016, Joannis Avramidis died at the age of 93, in Vienna, surrounded by his family.

== Artistic development and style ==
=== Beginnings as painter ===
The teachings of Professor Andersen at the Academy (1945–1949) introduced Avramidis to early Renaissance painters such as Masaccio and Piero della Francesca. As a student, he painted small landscapes (Note: Some of these early paintings are held at the Belvedere, Vienna.) and intimistic subjects that are suggestive of a certain penchant for melancholy and a proximity to Pittura metafisica. Andersen taught him the importance of composition and of reducing the painter's palette to local colours.

1948 was the year Avramidis made his first set of "Kubische Köpfe" (Cubic Heads) in charcoal.

After his graduation in 1949 as a painter, he began a further study in the Masterclass for Conservation and Technology taught by Robert Eigenberger (1890–1979).

=== A new vocation as sculptor ===
In 1953, Avramidis made his first sculpture, a "Kopf" (Head), out of quarry stone (now in the collection of the National Gallery, Athens). He showed this work to Fritz Wotruba, who had been teaching in Vienna since his return from exile in Switzerland. Wotruba's enthusiasm led him to accept Avramidis into his sculpture class at the Academy of Fine Arts in Vienna and award a private studio space to Avramidis to work in for the duration of his studies. Fellow students were: Andreas Urteil, Alfred Hrdlicka, Alfred Czerny, Erwin Reiter, Franz Anton Coufal, Leopold Höfinger, Roland Goeschl and Oswald Oberhuber.

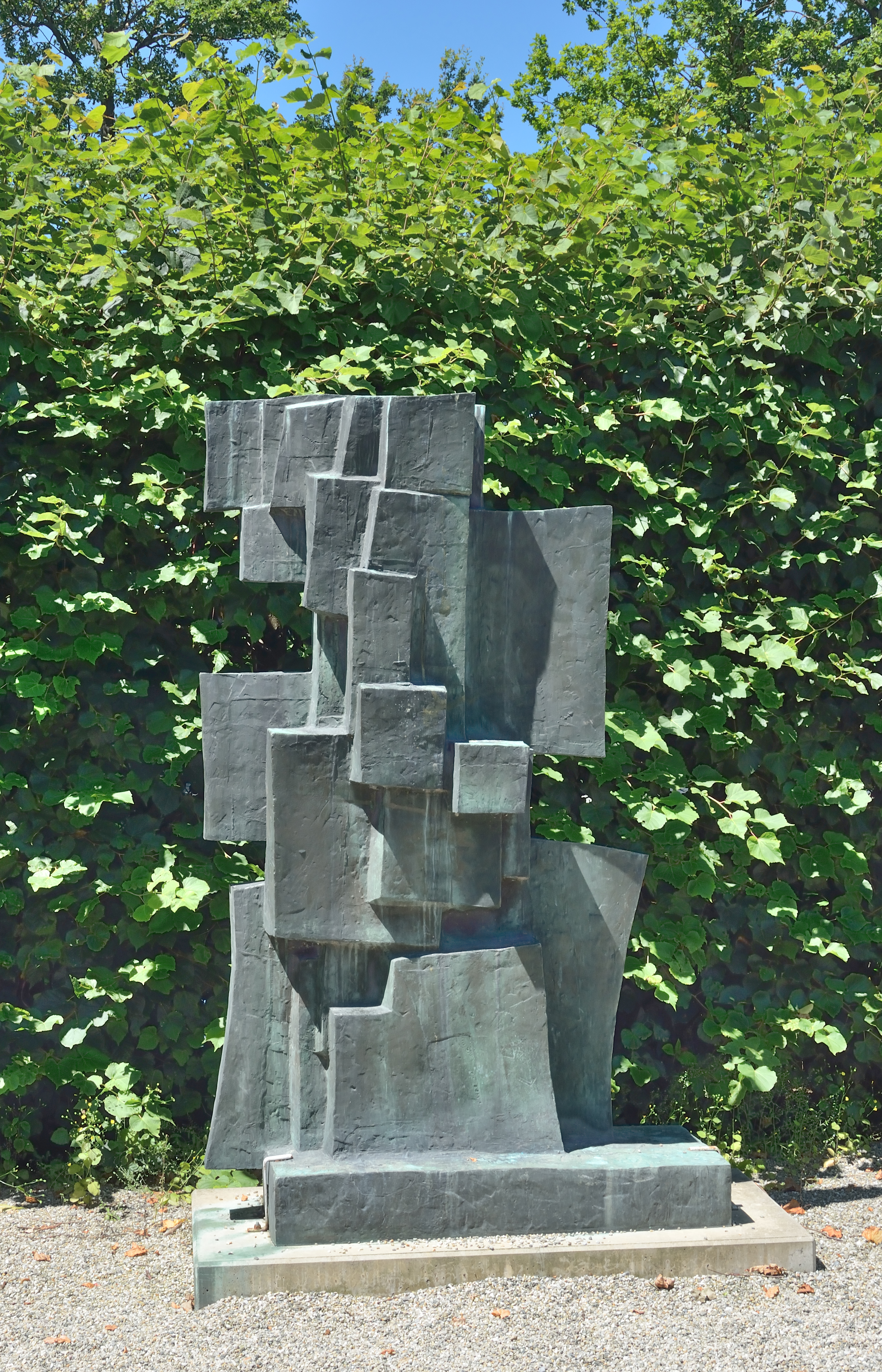
"Große Figur für Luzern" (1966–67) by Fritz Wotruba, Österreichischer Skulpturenpark, Graz

While his 1954 bronze sculpture "Kleine Halbfigur" (Small Half-Figure) is still embedded in the Wotruba tradition with its additive, cubist construction, other bronze sculptures such as "Torso" and "Kopf" (Head) mark the beginnings of an independent development towards the calculated multi-axiality of the figure. The tendency towards exact segmentation of the limbs can be observed particularly in the nude drawings and proportion schemes for sculptures.

In 1955, he spent some time studying in Paris, where he became friends with the poet and translator Jean-Claude Hemery (1931–1985).

Since 1956, his graduation year, the search for the 'absolute figure' stands at the centre of his work. Consequently, two eras serve as sources of inspiration for the artist, eras in which the figure and its proportions were held as the measure of all things. These are the Classical Antiquity and the Italian Renaissance. Avramidis allows the borders between abstraction and figurative depiction to merge in his sculptures. Softly rounded curves suggest the human body without defining it, whilst various profile views are fanned out, as though blurred.

«Ich habe das Wunschbild, daß meine Arbeit so wenig wie möglich zeitabhängig ist. Meine Idealvorstellung ist, daß ich meine Arbeit auch in einer anderen Zeit hätte machen können, etwa in der Frührenaissance oder in der antiken Archaik.» (in German)

Translation :

«I would like my work to be as timeless as possible. My ideal vision is that I could have made my work in a different era as well, for example in the early Renaissance or the ancient archaic period.»

— Joannis Avramidis

"Avramidis’ Ahnenreihe ist eine klassische, wobei “klassisch” nichts Geringeres als die Vollendung einer Idee meint. Avramidis’ Utopie der “Absoluten Figur” erwuchs aus dem steten Kampf zwischen den der Natur abgerungenen “Daten” und der durch die Idee gleichermaβen erzwungenen Konstruktion: Zeichnung und Skulptur als unauflösbar verflochtene Annäherung an ein Ideales, die Zeiten übergreifendes Menschenbild, das es zu rekonstruieren galt. Avramidis’ einzigartige Leistung gründet in der lakonischen Nüchternheit seiner bilhauerischen Vorstellung, welche die gröβtmöglische Objektivierung der Form konstruktiv anstrebt und dennoch nichts als deren sublimierte Sinnlichkeit meint. Es war Avramidis’ Überzeugung, daβ es nur noch möglich sei, in das geistige Zentrum der Bildhauerei vorzustoβen, indem das Individuelle zugunsten des Universellen preisgegeben werden müsse." (in German);

Translation : "Avramidis' line of ancestors is a classical one, whereby "classical" means nothing less than the fulfilment of an idea. Avramidis' utopia of the "Absolute Figure" grew out of the constant struggle between the "data" wrested from nature and the construction forced by the idea in equal measure: drawing and sculpture as an indissolubly interwoven approach to an ideal image of man that transcended the ages and had to be reconstructed. Avramidis' unique achievement is based on the laconic sobriety of his sculptural conception, which constructively strives for the greatest possible objectification of form and yet means nothing more than its sublimated sensuality. Avramidis was convinced that it was only possible to advance into the spiritual centre of sculpture by abandoning the individual in favour of the universal."

— Michael Semff, Direktor der Staatlichen Graphischen Sammlung in München, in "Joannis Avramidis – Skulpturen und Zeichnungen", monograph, 2005

In 1959, he was invited by commissioner Josef Musil to participate with a stone sculpture, "Figur“ (Figure), and a bronze sculpture, "Studie“ (Study), in the Austrian selection for the 28th Venice Biennale (16 June – 21 Oct 1956), where work of eleven other Austrian painters and sculptors was shown in the elegant National Pavilion designed by Josef Hoffman.

1957 marked the year during which Avramidis got his first solo show, at the renowned Galerie Würthle (est. 1865, since 1881 active in Vienna), and when he developed the first sketches for sculptures based on mathematical calculations, such as "Bein" (Leg), a bronze. It is also the year in which he made the acquaintance of Annemarie Persche, who would later become his second wife.

==== Figuren and Saülenfiguren ====
While Avramidis' 1958 bronze sculpture "Modellierte Figur" (Modelled Figure) was still modelled after an Ancient Greek kouros, his "Große Figur“ (Large Figure) from the same year was the first sculpture to consistently define the body as a coupled column, where limbs and body are fused together in a closed shape. In his modular Figuren-sculptures, Avramidis was to reduce the anthropomorphic to its most elemental form, thus testing one of his key design principles for the following decades and creating Avramidis' signature style. From a single Figur he quickly evolved into creating a series of Figurengruppen (Groups of Figures), clustering the individual figures tightly into a fused block of figures. The groups always concern an uneven number of figures. In Avramidis' distinct style épuré (purist style), all the figures are faceless, anonymous, static and stern, which would lead Werner Hofmann to describe Avramidis' style as "Der Rhythmus der Strenge" (the Rhythm of Severity).

In 1963 Avramidis made a sculpture entitled "Saülen" (Columns) for the first time. Another version from 1963, "Modell für eine Säule II" (Model for a Column II) shows the principle of stacking a single Figur or a Figurengruppe with the same, but inverted, Figur or Figurengruppe, thus creating a mirrored columnar effect which could then be replicated endlessly. This process would ultimately be leading Avramidis to conceive his magnum opus, the "Humanitas-Saüle" (Column of Humanity), during the 1990s, work that is clearly influenced by Constantin Brâncuși's Endless Column.

==== Polis, Tempel and Agora ====
During the 1965–66 academy year, when he had taken over the Class for Nude Drawing (in German : Klasse für Aktzeichnen) at the Academy of Fine Arts Vienna from Herbert Boeckl (1894–1966), he began working on "Polis", a further evolution of the Figurengruppe, and made the initial sketches for "Tempel" (Temple), a never realised project Avramidis pursued till the end of his life. He made a number of preparatory sketches and models such as "Tempel in Olympia", 1963 – 1974, or "Tempel – Modellierte Figur", which evolved from the Polis-group into a circular wall of columns, with the 1958 bronze "Modellierte Figur" projected to stand in the centre of the large-scale "Tempel" sculpture.

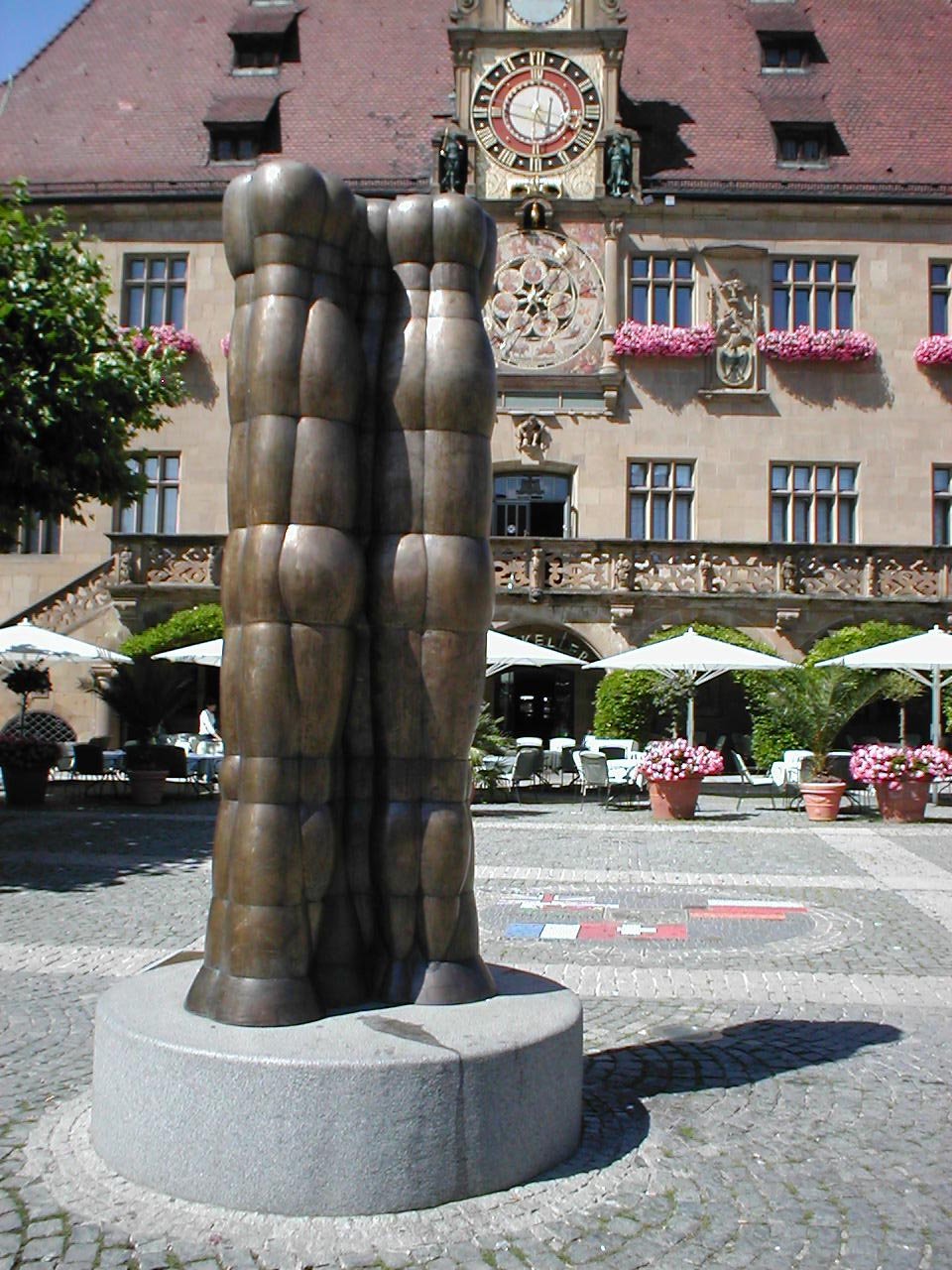
Große Dreiergruppe für Agora (1980), Rathaus Heilbronn

"Agora" was another, even grander, project that never made it to realisation, although Avramidis' sketches and sculpture studies can give us a glimpse of what was intended. In one drawing from 1972 he imagined a giant Head to be surrounded by individual figures or group figures.

Polis, (Note: The ancient Greek word "polis" (in Greek: πόλις) refers to the city or the state, but above all it also refers to the community of citizens. It consists of people with equal rights who voluntarily join together to form a unit. It goes back to Plato's Utopian idea of a City-State as a unity of free and equal individuals.) Temple and Agora (Note: The ancient Greek word "agora" (in Greek: ἀγορά), meaning "gathering place" or "assembly", was a central public space in ancient Grecian cities of which the Ancient Agora of Athens is the best-known example. The agora was the centre of the athletic, artistic, business, social, spiritual, and political life in the city. It is the best representation of a city-state's response to accommodate the social and political order of the polis.) are all topoi that stem from his encounter as an adolescent boy with the impressive remnants of Greek antiquity in Athens during the years of hardship spend in exile in Greece with his family. These formative years led him to discover his ancestral roots as a "Hellene", a persona that would guide him through all of his career.

==== Bandfiguren ====
In 1966, Avramidis started making a new type of sculptures, called "Bandfiguren" (Band Figures) — as an antithesis to his closed upright "Säulenfiguren"—, during his tenure as visiting professor at the Hochschule für bildende Künste Hamburg. They generally come in three typical formal declinations: Orthogonale Bandfiguren (Rectangular Band Figures) and Bandfiguren in the form of Kantprofile (Edge Profiles) or Rundprofile (Round Profiles): (Note: The Kantprofile are band extrusions of a more or less square cross section, with clear edges; the Rundprofile are band extrusions of a round cross section, without any edges, whereas Halbprofile are extrusions of a demi-lune type of section. Orthogonale Bandfiguren are basically Kantprofile but extruded in a rectilinear ribbon with bends at 90° angles.)

- examples of a Bandfigur (Kantprofil) are "Der Schreitende" (Walker) from 1966 to 1969, "Sitzende Bandfigur" (Seated Band Figure) from 1983 and "Kämpfer" (Fighter) from 1967 to 1986
- examples of a Bandfigur (Rundprofil) are "Sitzende Figur" (Seated Figure) from 1983, and a new development : the "Halbprofile" (Half Profiles),
- In the late 1960s, Avramidis started drawing "Rectangular Figures" to be made into aluminium sculptures such as "Figure (Rectangular Figure)", from 1970.

Art historian Prof. Dr. Christa Lichtenstern, writes about the Bandfiguren as being "centrifugal, in opposite direction: it stands under the guiding type of the ribbon (i.e. band) and increasingly seeks mobility and openness of space.", in contrast to the Saülenfiguren.

==== Kopffiguren ====
A recurring topos in Avramidis' oeuvre is the human head, in an often highly stylised, upright, even stern representation which is crystallising into total abstraction. This makes one think that Avramidis was not only imbued by Brâncuși's approach to sculpting heads, but sometimes willing to take the abstraction one step further.

As in his Figuren, features that are usually associated with the facial recognition of an individual person such as eyes, mouth, nose or ears cannot be distinguished in a lot of the sculptures or the drawings & paintings he produced over the years. All that remains are smooth (i.e. untextured), rounded, reduced shapes representing the oblong form of a skull, firmly attached to a strong, muscular neck, and sometimes a more prominent chin or the suggestion of hair mass, as can be witnessed in "Kopf 2" (Head 2) and "Kopf IV" (Head IV), both from 1959, "Kopf" (Head), from 1961 to 1970, "Kopf II" (Head II), from 1965, and "Stirn-Kinn Kopf" (Forehead-Chin Head), from 1971.

"Kopf IV [3 Stadien]" (Head IV [3 Stages]), from 1959, and "Asymmetrical Head", from 1960, are both intriguing works showing three evolving phases in the construction of a head. The 3 heads are made respectively of an aluminium lattice-work construction, an aluminium lattice-work construction filled in with plaster, and, finally, a bronze, presented together on a single aluminium plaque.

"Head-Rhombus" is an atypical head from 1967, in stainless steel, which Avramidis rarely used.

"Kopf – Das trojanische Pferd" (Head – The Trojan Horse), from 1970, changes course again both in shape as in materiality by resorting to the use of an orange-tinged synthetic resin filled in on an aluminium lattice-work construction. A similar shape exists also in bronze: "Kopf, das trojanische Pferd" (Head, the Trojan Horse).

"Großer Kopf" (Large Head), a large bronze from 1970, is other proof of the artistic design parameters used in Avramidis' work concerning harmony, symmetry and proportion, but, this time, a distinctive nose, mouth, chin and the subtle suggestion of eyes are clear identifiers of the human head.

"Kopf mit tiefenräumlichen Flächen I" (Head with Deep Spatial Surfaces I), from 1969/70, a version of which is shown in a courtyard at the German Bundestag, boldly offers a dramatic counterpoint to the previously rounded shapes. Here, Avramidis goes for even greater spatial reduction by opting for only 2 strong wedge-shaped forms, with almost razor-sharp angular edges, representing just the skull and neck. Another version, "Kopf mit tiefenräumlichen Flächen III" (Head with Deep Spatial Surfaces III), also from 1969/70, adds a third form, a trapezoidal prism, suggestive of a nose.

Avramidis also produced Rectangular Figure or Band Figure heads such as "Head Front Side (Rectangular Head)", from 1968, in aluminium, and "Bandkopf II" (Band Head II), from 1981/82, in solid aluminium.

During the 1990s Avramidis painted or drew a number of iterations on the Köpfe-theme and made a new type of an egg-shaped bronze head in 1996.

In 1999, an exhibition dedicated solely to Avramidis' Heads was organised by Galerie Thomas.

In 2003, he conceived of "Rechter Halbkopf" (Right Semi-Head), going back to the same mixed media technique used in 1970 on "Kopf – Das trojanische Pferd" (Head – The Trojan Horse).

==== Baum and Mensch-Baum ====
Another theme Avramidis often came back to are "Baüme" (Trees) and its anthropomorphic derivative "Mensch-Baüme" (Man Trees), pouring the morphing of Man into Tree in bronze.

=== Always a painter ===
During his lifetime Avramidis deliberately never exhibited any of his painted work to the public. Only after his demise, a number of paintings have emerged from the artist's estate, now run by his daughter Julia. A surprising 2022 gallery show "Paintings & Sculptures" shed a new light on the artist and his complete oeuvre.

Some rather compelling paintings in earthy reds or steely blues accompany or even re-invigorate the understanding of well known sculptures as they offer a different view of the inner thinking of Avramidis. Other paintings open up the private world of his restricted circle of friends for whom he apparently loved making portraits, such as Klaus Demus (1983) or the architect Roland Rainer (1987). He also drew portraits of the poet Michael Guttenbrunner (1983), his brother Thomas (1969) and of himself, in versions dating back to 1970 and 1990, all donated to the National Gallery of Greece.

From the 1980s onwards, Avramidis also painted a series of unusual colour studies, termed "Sonnen" (Suns), abstractions within the confines of a pure circular form, often on a white background. In the eye of the beholder, they're evidently alien to the rest of his oeuvre, or are they not ...? We may never know why Avramidis made such precise colour studies when his sculptures were generally devoid of colour.

He even started painting landscapes, from memory, reminiscent of his walks in the Prater park between the sculptors’ building of the Academy of Fine Arts and the state studios in the Krieau area where he worked. In these landscapes the return to the figurative is unexpected, as the connection to the sculptural works is not in terms of form, rather in the principle that he always stressed, as far back as 1962 at the Venice Biennale:

«Nichts ohne die Erfrischung durch die Unmittelbarkeit der lebendigen Anschauung.» (in German)

Translation:

«Nothing without the invigoration by means of the immediacy of living contemplation.»

— Joannis Avramidis, quotation reported by Wieland Schmied

It can be concluded Avramidis never ceased to be a painter after all, even as he gained fame through his sculptures during his lifetime.

Undoubtedly the attraction lay in the fact that the act of painting or drawing is performed rapidly, almost instinctively, while sculpture, especially the cerebral type Avramidis committed to, requires time, reflection and nearly as much preparatory work as architecture.

=== Notable pupils ===
Austrian sculptors Reinhard Puch (* 1947) and Wolfgang Götzinger (1944–2015) trained under Prof. Avramidis at the Akademie.

== Honours and awards ==
- 1956 : State Prize of the Academy of Fine Arts in Vienna (in German : Staatspreis der Akademie der Bildenden Künste in Wien)
- 1958 : Austrian promotion prize for sculpture (in German : Österreichischer Förderungspreis für Plastik)
- 1961 : Award from the City of Vienna (in German : Förderungspreis der Stadt Wien)
- 1961 : Hugo von Montfort-prize (Bregenz)
- 1961 : Prize of the Austrian Federation of Industry (in German : Preis des Österreichischen Industriellenverbandes)
- 1964 : City of Vienna Prize for Visual Arts (in German : Preis der Stadt Wien für Bildende Kunst)
- 1968 : Will Grohmann-Prize (City of Berlin)
- 1973 : Prize of the 2nd International Small-Scale Sculpture Biennale, Budapest
- 1973 : Grand Austrian State Prize for Visual Arts (in German: Großer Österreichischer Staatspreis für Bildende Kunst) with a laudatio from Fritz Wotruba.

«Avramidis ist nicht nur "die" Begabung seiner Generation in Österreich, er ist es sicherlich auch in Deutschland, und er gehört zu den wenigen großen Bildhauern unserer Zeit.» (in German)

Translation :

«Avramidis is not only "the" talent of his generation in Austria, he is certainly also "the" talent of his generation in Germany, and he is one of the few great sculptors of our time.»

— Fritz Wotruba, on the occasion of the Grand Austrian State Prize awarded to Joannis Avramidis, 1973

- 1973 : elected Member of the Austrian Senate of the Arts (in German: Mitglied des Österreichischen Kunstsenats)
- 1985 : Austrian Decoration for Science and Art (in German: Österreichische Ehrenzeichen für Wissenschaft und Kunst) and elected member of the Kurie für Kunst.
- 1998 : elected Corresponding Member of the Academy of Athens
- 2000 : elected Corresponding Member of the Bavarian Academy of Fine Arts (in German : Bayerischen Akademie der Schönen Künste)
- 2013 : Grand Decoration of Honour in Gold with Star for Services to the Republic of Austria (in German: Große Goldene Ehrenzeichen mit Stern für Verdienste um die Republik Österreich)
- 2014 : Jerg-Ratgeb-prize (HAP Grieshaber Stiftung Reutlingen)

== Exhibitions ==
- 1956 : The 28th Venice Biennale of 1956, Italy.
- 1957 : Galerie Würthle, Vienna, Austria.
- 1961 : first showing in the Galerie Welz, Salzburg, Austria.
- 1962 : The 31st Venice Biennale of 1962, Italy. (Note: The 1962 Venice Biennale show included a.o.: "Kleine Figur" (1959–62), "Figur I", (1959), "Vierfigurengruppe" (1959–60))
- 1964 : Avramidis Urteil Wotruba. Skulptur & Plastik 3., gallery show 8 May – 13 June 1964, Galerie Dr. Appel, Frankfurt am Main, Germany
- 1964 : 3rd edition of Documenta, Kassel, Germany.
- 1965 : Galerie im Taxispalais, Innsbruck, Austria.
- 1967 : Joannis Avramidis, exhibition 24 Feb – 16 April 1967 at the Kestner-Gesellschaft, Hanover, Germany, and exhibition 6 Sep – 1 Oct 1967 at the Deutsche Gesellschaft für Bildende Kunst (Kunstverein Berlin) and the Galerie im Europa-Center Berlin, Germany.
- 1967 : Städtische Kunstgalerie, Bochum, Germany.
- 1967 : Joannis Avramidis. Skulptur + Plastik 6, gallery show 10 June – 22 July 1967, Galerie Appel und Fertsch, Karmeliterkloster Frankfurt, Germany.
- 1968 : Joannis Avramadis – Sculptures and Drawings, exhibition from 03.02.68 – 25.02.68, Kunstnernes Hus, Oslo, Norway.
- 1968 : Galerie nächst St. Stephan, Vienna, Austria; Kunstverein, Berlin, Germany; Badischer Kunstverein, Karlsruhe, Germany;
- 1969 : Twentieth Century Sculpture Walker Art Center – Selections from the Collection, exhibition, Walker Art Center, Minneapolis, USA.
- 1970 : Joannis Avramidis, gallery show June–July 1970, Galerie Krugier, Geneva, Switzerland.
- 1971 : Joannis Avramidis, gallery show, Krugier Gallery, New York, USA.
- 1973 : Galerie auf der Stubenbastei, Vienna, Austria.
- 1973 : 2nd International Small-Scale Sculpture Biennale (in Hungarian: II. Nemzetközi Kisplasztikai Biennálé) in Budapest, Hungary.
- 1974 : Joannis Avramidis : Trigonpersonale 5. Plastik – Grafik, exhibition 5.10. – 10.11.1974, Künstlerhaus and Neue Galerie am Landesmuseum Joanneum, Graz, Austria.
- 1975 : Galerie Ulysses, Vienna, Austria.
- 1977 : 6th edition of Documenta, Kassel, Germany. Galerie Dröscher, Hamburg, Germany.
- 1979 : 3rd Biennale of Sydney, Australia.
- 1979 : Neue Galerie, Vienna; Carinthischer Sommer, Stift Ossiach, Carinthia, Austria.
- 1979 : Teste – Köpfe – Têtes – Heads, gallery show 30 Nov – 31 Dec 1979, Galleria Pieter Coray, Lugano, Switzerland.
- 1979–80 : Joannis Avramidis – Skulpturen und Handzeichnungen, exhibition from 18 Nov 1979 till 6 Jan 1980, Kunsthalle Bremen, Germany.
- 1980 : Joannis Avramidis – Skulpturen und Handzeichnungen, exhibition from 11 Jan till 10 Feb 1980, Städtische Kunsthalle Mannheim, Germany.
- 1980 : Joannis Avramidis. Skulpturen, Entwürfe, Zeichnungen, exhibition, Kunsthalle Nürnberg, Germany.
- 1981 : Skulptur im öffentlichen Raum, outdoor sculpture exhibition 23.8.1981–31.10.1981 on the ramparts in the centre of Bremen and in the Bürgerpark Bremerhaven from 23.08.1981 till 31.10.1981, Bremen, Germany.
- 1981 : Antologia 25 scultori 1892–1980, gallery show from 9 April to 16 May 1981 at the Galleria Pieter Coray, Milan, Italy.
- 1982 : erection of „Große Säule“ (1963) in front of the Hofburg on the Michaelerplatz on the occasion of the festive exhibition of the Vienna Secession, Vienna, Austria.
- 1982 : Malerei und Plastik des 20. Jahrhunderts (Painting and Sculpture from the XX^{th} century), exhibition at the Staatsgalerie Stuttgart, Germany.
- 1986 : Adrian X, Aduatz, Avramidis ... Die unbekannte Sammlung – Aspekt Steiermark: Dauerleihgaben des Bundesministeriums für Unterricht, Kunst und Sport an die Neue Galerie am Landesmuseum Joanneum in Graz (Adrian X, Aduatz, Avramidis ... The Unknown Collection – Aspect Styria: Permanent Loans from the Federal Ministry for Education, the Arts and Sport to the Neue Galerie at the Landesmuseum Joanneum in Graz), exhibition «Aspekt Steiermark» from 11. 1. to 2. 2. 1986, Graz, Austria.
- 1986 : Joannis Avramidis – Skulpturen, exhibition at the Karmeliterkloster from 14.3. to 11.7.1986, Galerie Appel und Fertsch, Frankfurt, Germany.
- 1986 : Österreichische Bildhauer – gelernt bei Wotruba, exhibition June – August 1986 in the castle Burg Lockenhaus (Burgenland), Vienna, Austria.
- 1986 : Joannis Avramidis. Zeichnungen, exhibition from 14 June – 10 Aug 1986, Staatsgalerie Stuttgart, Graphische Sammlung, Stuttgart, Germany.
- 1987 : Rupertinum, Salzburg, Austria.
- 1988 : Kunsthalle Nürnberg, Germany.
- 1988: Skulpturen und Zeichnungen (sculptures and drawings), Schlossgarten and Kunstverein Ludwigsburg, Germany.
- 1989 : Joannis Avramidis, »Agora« : Skulpturen und Zeichnungen 1953 – 1988, gallery show held 15 April till 8 July 1989 with sculptures and drawings by the artist from 1953 to 1988, Galerie Brusberg, Berlin, Germany. (Note: The "Agora" show included a.o.: "Kopf" (1955), "Großer Halbtorso" (1958), "Büste" (1962), "Mittlere Figur II" (1963), "Trias" (1970))
- 1991 : Skulpturenpfad, Osnabrück; Joannis Avramidis ..., outdoor sculpture exhibition connecting the Kunsthalle, the exhibition area Heger-Tor-Viertel, inner courtyard of the Dominican monastery and the Museumsquartier, organised by the Kulturamt Osnabrück / GildewArt-Galerie Reincke, Osnabrück, Germany.
- 1991 : Figur in Wien – Skulpturen : Annemarie Avramidis – Joannis Avramidis – ... – Fritz Wotruba, group sculpture exhibition 15 April – 28 June 1991, on initiative of the Universität für Bodenkultur Wien (BOKU) and the Wiener Kunstverein "Figur", Wilhelm Exner Haus, Vienna, Austria.
- 1994 : Haus der Kultur der Stadt Graz, Austria.
- 1996 : Galerie Appel und Fertsch, Frankfurt, Germany.
- 1997 : Stad(t)t-Art – Kunst in 56 homöopathischen Dosen, Kultursekretariat NRW Gütersloh, Germany.
- 1997 : Solo exhibition at the Institut Français in Thessaloniki (European Capital of Culture), Greece
- 1997 : Joannis Avramidis. A Classic of Contemporary Sculpture, a retrospective exhibition of the artist's sculptures, paintings and drawings at the National Gallery of Greece in Athens at the end of which the artist donated all of his exposed work to the museum, including 53 sculptures, 11 paintings and 104 drawings.
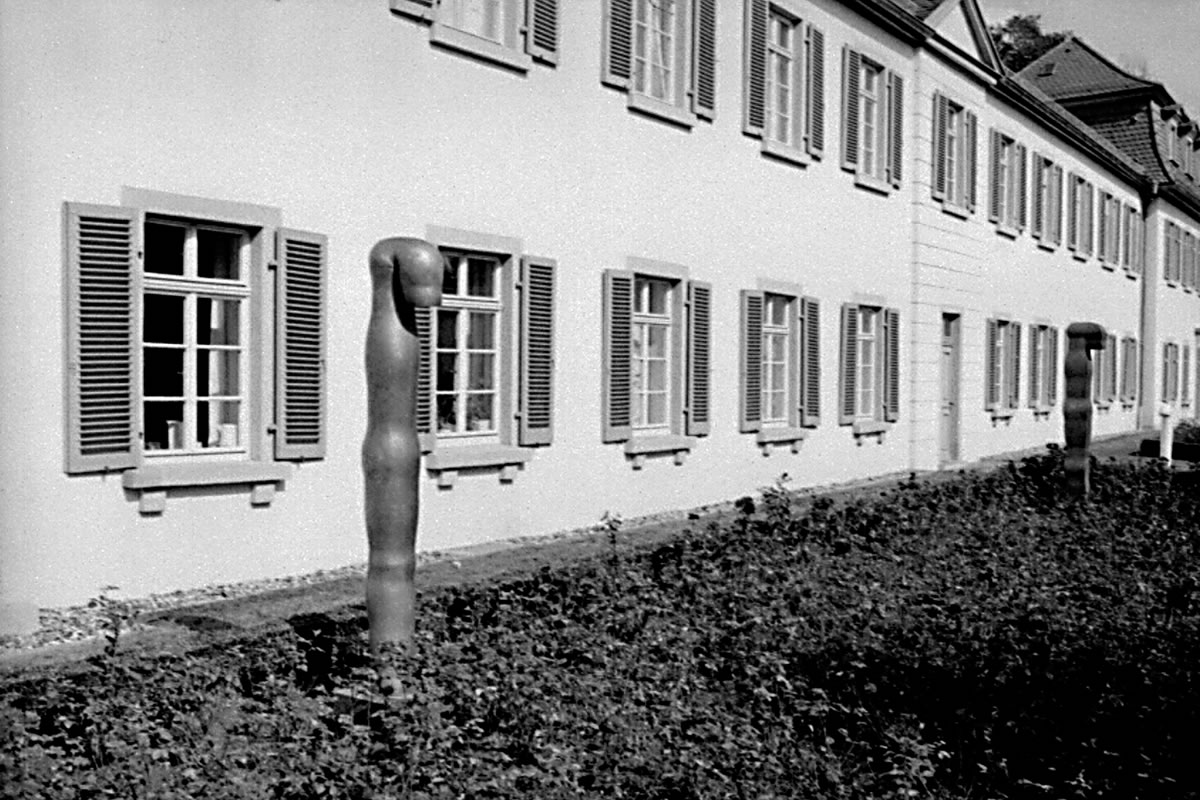
- Sculptures Joannis Avramidis in Bamberg in 1999
  1999 : Joannis and Annemarie Avramidis, outdoor sculpture exhibition, The International House of Artists Villa Concordia (in German: Internationales Künstlerhaus Villa Concordia), Bamberg, Germany.
- 1999 : Grieche unter Griechen. Joannis Avramidis in der Glyptothek (Greek amongst Greeks. Joannis Avramidis in the Glyptotek), exhibition from 23.6 – 17.10 at the Glyptothek, München, Germany.
- 1999 : Joannis Avramidis. Köpfe, gallery show 7 May – 31 July 1999, Galerie Thomas, Munich, Germany.
- 1999 : Figur II (1984), exhibited from May to October 1999 at the Jesuitenkirche, Vienna, Austria.
- 1999–2000 : Zeitschnitt 1900–2000, exhibition 16 Dec 1999 – 20 Feb 2000 at Lentos Kunstmuseum and Neue Galerie der Stadt Linz, Austria.
- 2000–2001 : Classical Memories in Modern Greek Art, exhibition 24 Oct 2000 – 21 Jan 2001 at Onassis Cultural Center, Olympic Tower, Alexander S. Onassis Public Benefit Foundation, New York, USA.
- 2001 : Objekte. Skulptur nach 45 in Österreich, Atelier Augarten, Vienna, Austria.
- 2002 : Joannis Avramidis : Im Dialog III – Polis, Kouros & Figur, exhibition in the Evangelische Stadtkirche Darmstadt, Darmstadt, Germany.
- 2003 : Skulptur – von der Stabilität zur Mobilität (Sculpture – from Stability to Mobility), gallery show 01.05.2003 – 30.07.2003, Galerie am Lindenplatz, Vaduz, Liechtenstein.
- 2004 : Joannis Avramidis : Skulpturen, Malerei, Zeichnungen, gallery show, Galerie Welz, Salzburg, Austria.
- 2005 onwards : Ein Wald der Skulpturen. Sammlung Simon Spierer (A Forest of Sculptures, The Simon Spierer Collection), exhibition Hessisches Landesmuseum Darmstadt, Germany.
  - Note : this collection has travelled since its donation in 2004 to the HLMD to many places around Europe in the following years
- 2005 : Joannis Avramidis, gallery show, Florian Sundheimer Kunsthandel, Munich, Germany.
- 2005 : Joannis Avramidis – Zeichnungen, exhibition Staatliche Graphische Sammlung München 10.03 to 24.04.2005, Pinakothek der Moderne, Munich, Germany.
- 2005 : Farbe Fläche Form, gallery show, Galerie Neher, Essen, Germany.
- 2005 : figur / skulptur, exhibition, Sammlung Essl (Essl Collection), Klosterneuburg, Austria.
- 2006 : Joannis Avramidis, exhibition, Museum "Pfalzgalerie", Kaiserslautern, Germany.
- 2006 : Ein gemeinsamer Ort – Skulpturen, Plastiken, Objekte (A Shared Place – Sculptures and Objects), exhibition 24.06 to 05.11.2006, Lentos Art Museum, Linz, Austria.
- 2007 : Joannis Avramidis, gallery show, Galerie Appel, Frankfurt, Germany.
- 2007: Einblicke – Privatsammlung Piepenbrock (An Insight – The Private Collection Piepenbrock), exhibition 30.03 to 27.08, 2007, Berlinische Galerie, Berlin, Germany.
- 2007–2008 : Classical Memories in Modern Greek Art, group exhibition from 10.12.2007 to 18.02.2008 at National Gallery of Greece, Athens, Greece.
- 2007–2008 : Rooms, Conversations, exhibition 13.12.07 – 17.02.08, Frac île-de-France / Le Plateau Paris, Paris, France.
- 2008 : Zeitsprung, gallery show, Brusberg Berlin, Germany.
- 2009 : Best of Austria – Eine Kunstsammlung, exhibition, Lentos Art Museum, Linz, Austria.
- 2009 : Die Gegenwart der Linie, exhibition, Pinakothek der Moderne, Munich, Germany.
- 2009 : Ars Porcellana – Eine Reliefserie von Rosenthal, exhibition,Museum Moderner Kunst Stiftung Wörlen, Passau, Germany.
- 2009–2010 : Die 50er Jahre: Kunst und Kunstverständnis in Wien, exhibition, Wien Museum MUSA: Museum auf Abruf & Startgalerie, Vienna, Austria.
- 2009–2010 : Der Schatz am Zugersee – Die Sammlung, exhibition, Kunsthaus Zug, Switzerland.
- 2010 : CORSO. Werke der Sammlung ESSL im Dialog, exhibition Essl Museum, Klosterneuburg, Austria.
- 2010 : Strike a pose, gallery show, Florian Sundheimer Kunsthandel, Munich, Germany.
- 2010–2011 : out of the office. Unternehmensgalerie Ruhr 2010, exhibition Kunstmuseum Bochum, Germany.
- 2011 : Schwarz auf Weiss, gallery show, Lukas Feichtner Galerie, Vienna, Austria.
- 2012 : Zauberspiegel: Die Sammlung nach 1945, exhibition, Kunsthalle Bremen, Germany.
- 2012 : Joannis Avramidis. Körper & Struktur, exhibition from 18 Sep to 4 Nov 2012 celebrating the 90th birthday of the artist, Kunsthistorisches Museum, Vienna, Austria.
- 2012 : Joannis Avramidis : Skulpturen, Gemälde, Zeichnungen (Sculptures, Paintings, Drawings), gallery show coinciding with the artist's 90th birthday anniversary, Galerie ▪ bei der Albertina ▪ Zetter, Vienna, Austria.
- 2013 : NUR SKULPTUR!, exhibition, Kunsthalle Mannheim, Germany.
- 2014 : Avramidis, Jerg-Ratgeb-Preis 2014, exhibition from 13 May till 13 July 2014, Kunstmuseum Reutlingen | Spendhaus, with temporary outdoor exhibit of artist's sculptures located near the Stadthalle, the Tübinger Tor and the garden of the Heimatmuseum, Reutlingen, Germany.
- 2015–2016 : POM' PO PON PO PON PON POM PON, exhibition, Middelheim Museum, Antwerp, Belgium.
- 2016 : Joannis Avramidis, solo exhibition at Lempertz Berlin, Germany, from 29 January to 24 February 2016 and at Lempertz Brussels, Belgium, from 4 March to 9 April 2016.
- 2017 : Temporary exhibit during "Blickachsen 11" of Kreisgruppe (Circular Group), from 1963/1980, on display in Kurpark Bad Homburg, and of Vierfigurengruppe (Group of Four Figures), from 1982, in the park of the former Schloss Friedrichshof in Kronberg, Germany.
- 2017 : Joannis Avramidis, retrospective 2017, Leopold Museum, Vienna, Austria.
  - Note: For this occasion his 13,22 m high "Humanitas-Säule" (Column of Humanity) was temporarily erected on the square in the MuseumsQuartier, Vienna.
- 2017 : Joannis Avramidis und Schüler : Lois Anvidalfarei, Magnus Pöhacker, Giovanni Rindler, Florian Schaumberger, Albrecht Zauner, gallery show 1 July – 12 Aug 2017, Galerie Maier, Innsbruck, Austria.
- 2017 : Galerie in der Schlosskirche Neustrelitz, Germany;
- 2018 : Joannis Avramidis : Metamorphose, Mensch-Baum, Hybride Figur (Metamorphosis, Man Tree, Hybrid Figure), gallery show, Galerie ▪ bei der Albertina ▪ Zetter, Vienna, Austria.
- 2018 : Geneviève Asse – Joannis Avrimidis, group exhibition of paintings and sculptures from 21 Oct to 22 Dec 2018, Ditesheim & Maffei Fine Art, Neuchâtel, Switzerland.
- 2018 : Joannis Avramidis: Köpfe (Heads), gallery show in 2018, Galerie Ernst Hilger, Vienna, Austria.
- 2018–2019 : Zoran Mušič and Joannis Avramidis, gallery show 25 Oct 2018 – 19 Jan 2019, Shepherd W&K Galleries, New York, USA.
- 2019 : Zoran Mušič und Joannis Avramidis, exhibition 22 May - 13 Sep 2019 at Palais Schönborn-Batthyány, Galerie W&K – Wienerroither & Kohlbacher collaborating with Galerie MAGNET, Vienna, Austria.
- 2020 : Joannis Avramidis, “Another Look”, gallery show from 26.06.2020 to 29.08.2020 at Galerie Crone / Vienna, Austria.
- 2021 : Meisterbildhauer um Wotruba : Herbert Albrecht, Joannis Avramidis, Alfred Hrdlicka, Josef Pillhofer, Erwin Reiter, Andreas Urteil : Festspielausstellung 17. Juli – 4. September, gallery show during the Salzburger Festspiele 17 July – 4 Sep, Galerie Welz, Salzburg, Austria.
- 2021 : Geteilte Einheit, gallery show by Crone SIDE Vienna from 10 Feb – 4 March 2021, Hochhaus Herrengasse, Vienna, Austria.
- 2022 : Joannis Avramidis : Malerei & Skulptur (Painting & Sculpture), gallery show in 2022 coinciding with the artist's 100th birthday anniversary, Galerie ▪ bei der Albertina ▪ Zetter, Vienna, Austria.
- 2022 : Joannis Avramidis: Meisterwerke auf Papier (Masterworks on Paper), gallery show, Galerie Ernst Hilger, Vienna, Austria.
- 2022–2024: MIX & MATCH, Rediscovering the Collection, exhibition from 9/15/22 till 12/31/24, Pinakothek der Moderne, Munich, Germany.
- 2024 : Silence-Stille, group exhibition at the Galerie Boisserée, Cologne, Germany.

== Sculpture in public and private collections ==
Several museums, private and public institutions hold work of Avramidis in their collections, such as:

- Torso (1956), Kunstmuseum Liechtenstein, Vaduz;
- Modellierte Figur (Modelled Figure), 1958, Leopold Museum, Vienna, Austria;
- Figur I (1959), Hamburger Kunsthalle, Hamburg, Germany;
- Kopf IV (3 Stadien), 1959, Academy of Fine Arts Vienna (in German: Akademie der bildenden Künste Wien);
- Fünffigurengruppe (1959–1960), Pinakothek der Moderne, Munich, Germany;
- Kopf (1959), Fünf Figuren (1959), Rumpf (1960) and Torso (1960), Kamm Collection Foundation, Kunsthaus Zug, Switzerland;
- Standing Figures (1959–60), Walker Art Center, Minneapolis, USA;
- Baum (Tree), 1960, Torso, 1962, and Kopf (Head), 1965, Frac île-de-France, Paris;
- Vollsymmetrische Rundplastik (Fully Symmetrical Round Sculpture), 1962, Städel Museum, Frankfurt am Main, Germany;
- Figur I (1963), Skulpturenmuseum Glaskasten, Marl, North Rhine-Westphalia, Germany;
- Große Figur II (1963), The Simon Spierer Collection, Hessisches Landesmuseum Darmstadt, Germany;
- Figur (1964), Lentos Art Museum, Linz, Austria;
- Der Schreitende / Walking Man (1966), The Israël Museum, Jerusalem;
- Schreitender (Striding Man), 1966–1969, Albertinum, Staatliche Kunstsammlungen Dresden, Germany;
- Der Schreitende4 (Striding Man 4), 1966–1969, Staatsgalerie Stuttgart, Germany;
- Head (1967), Rupert Museum, Stellenbosch, South-Africa;
- Relief (1977), Lentos Art Museum, Linz, Austria;
- Medium Figure (date unspecified), MOMus – Museum of Modern Art – Costakis Collection, Thessaloniki, Greece;
- numerous pieces, National Gallery – Alexandros Soutsos Museum, Athens, Greece;
- numerous pieces, among which drawings and 2 bronze versions of "Kopf" from 1954 and 1955, Museum der Moderne Salzburg, Austria;
- numerous pieces, Galerie ▪ bei der Albertina ▪ Zetter, Vienna, Austria;
- Figurengruppe (1980), Essl Museum, Klosterneuburg, Austria;
- Dreifigurengruppe (date?), Austrian Parliament Building, Vienna
- [to be expanded]

== Sculpture in open air ==
=== Austria ===
- Weiblicher Torso (1953) and Stehende Figur (1960), Belvedere museum, Vienna
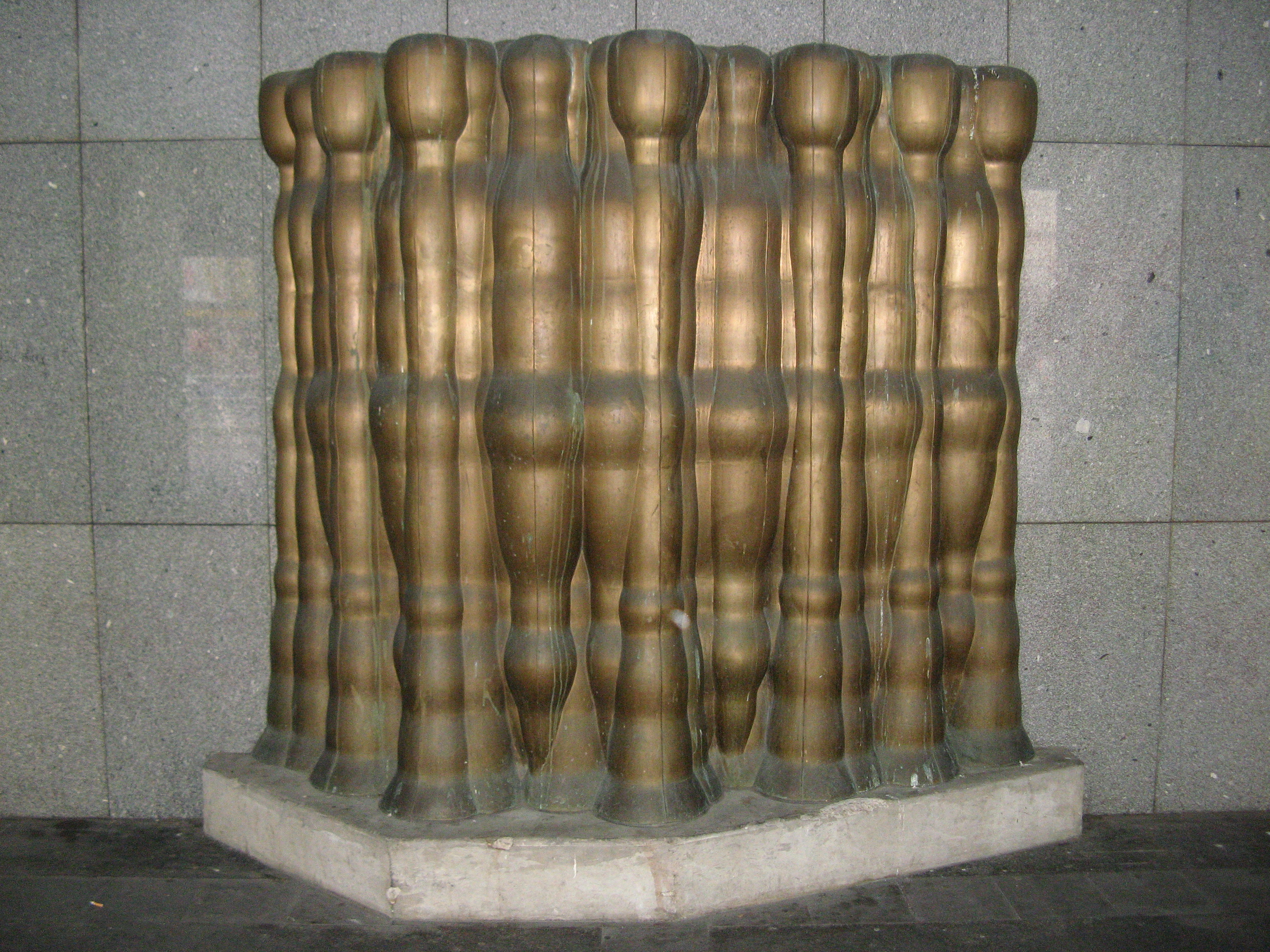
  Menschentorsi (1983/1993), campus Freihaus, TU Wien
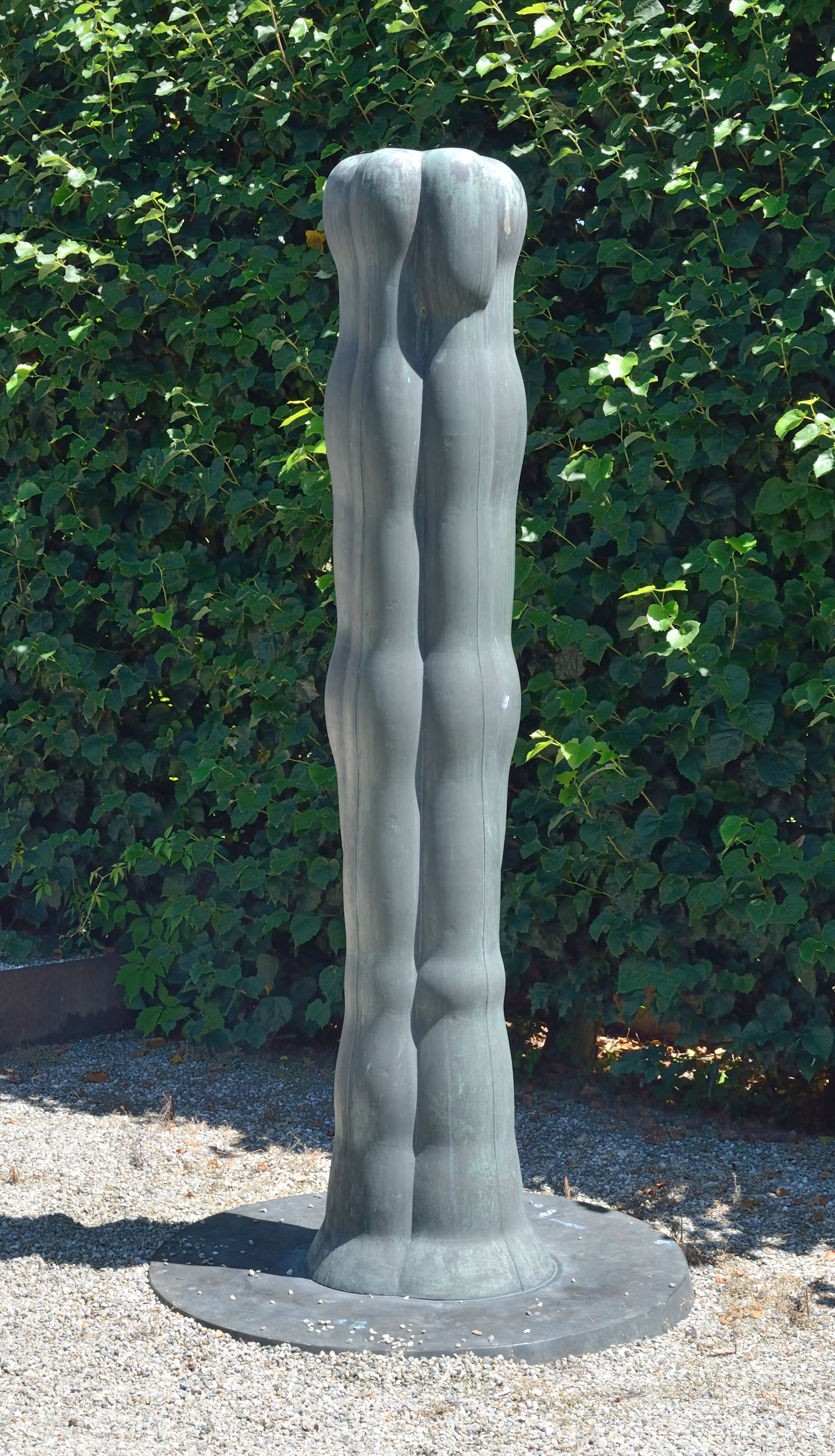
  Große Figur III (1963), Österreichischer Skulpturenpark, Graz
- Große Figur III (1963), Austrian Sculpture Park (in German : Österreichischer Skulpturenpark), Graz
- Menschentorsi (1983/1993), Arkadengang Technische Universität Wien, campus Freihaus, Wiedner Hauptstraße 8–10, Wieden (Vienna)
- [to be expanded]

=== Belgium ===
- Zweifigurengruppe B – Concave & Exterior (1964), Middelheim Open Air Sculpture Museum, Antwerp

=== Germany ===
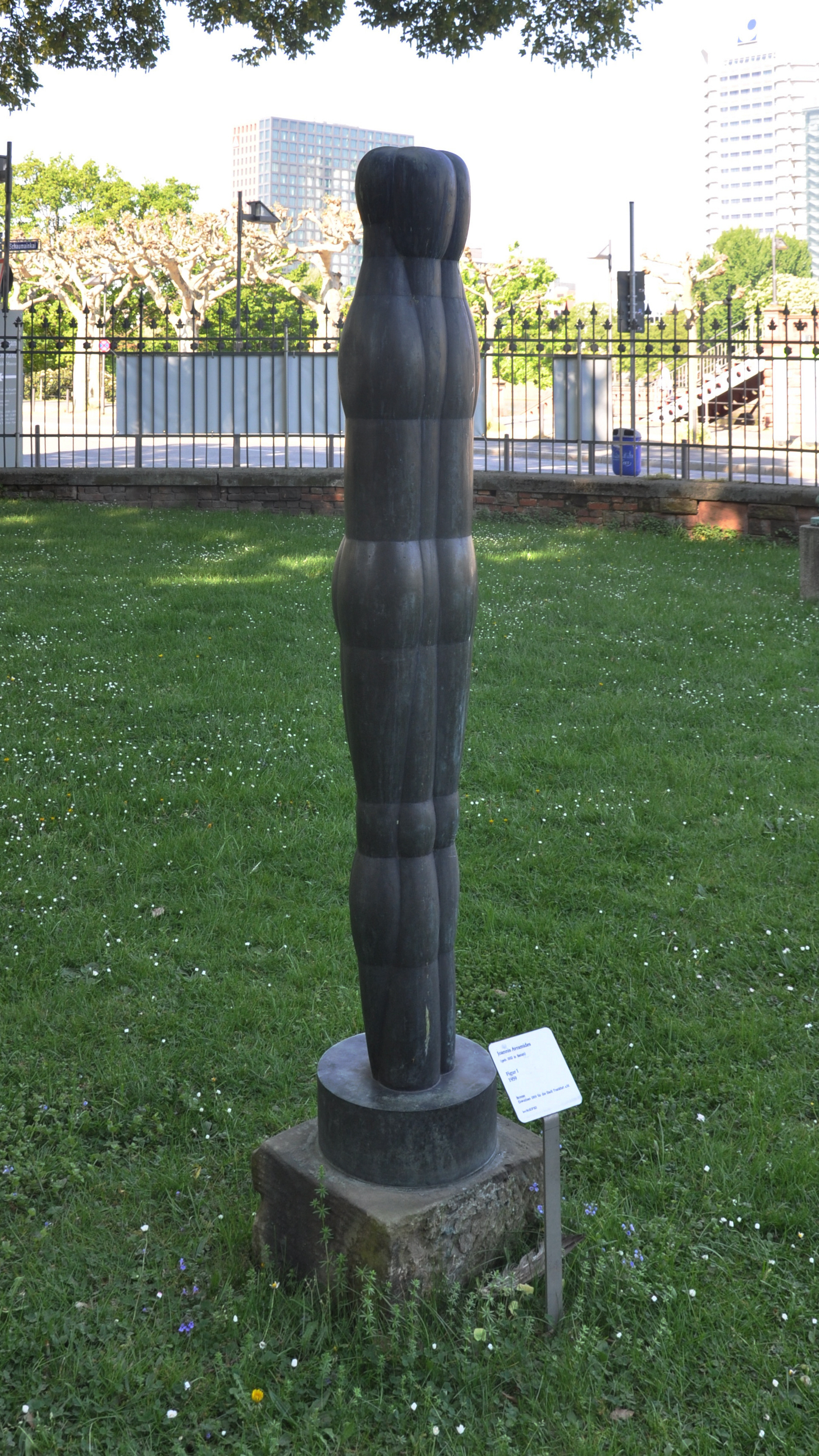
Figur I (1959), Städel Museum, Frankfurt am Main

- Figur I (1959), sculpture garden Städel Museum, Frankfurt am Main
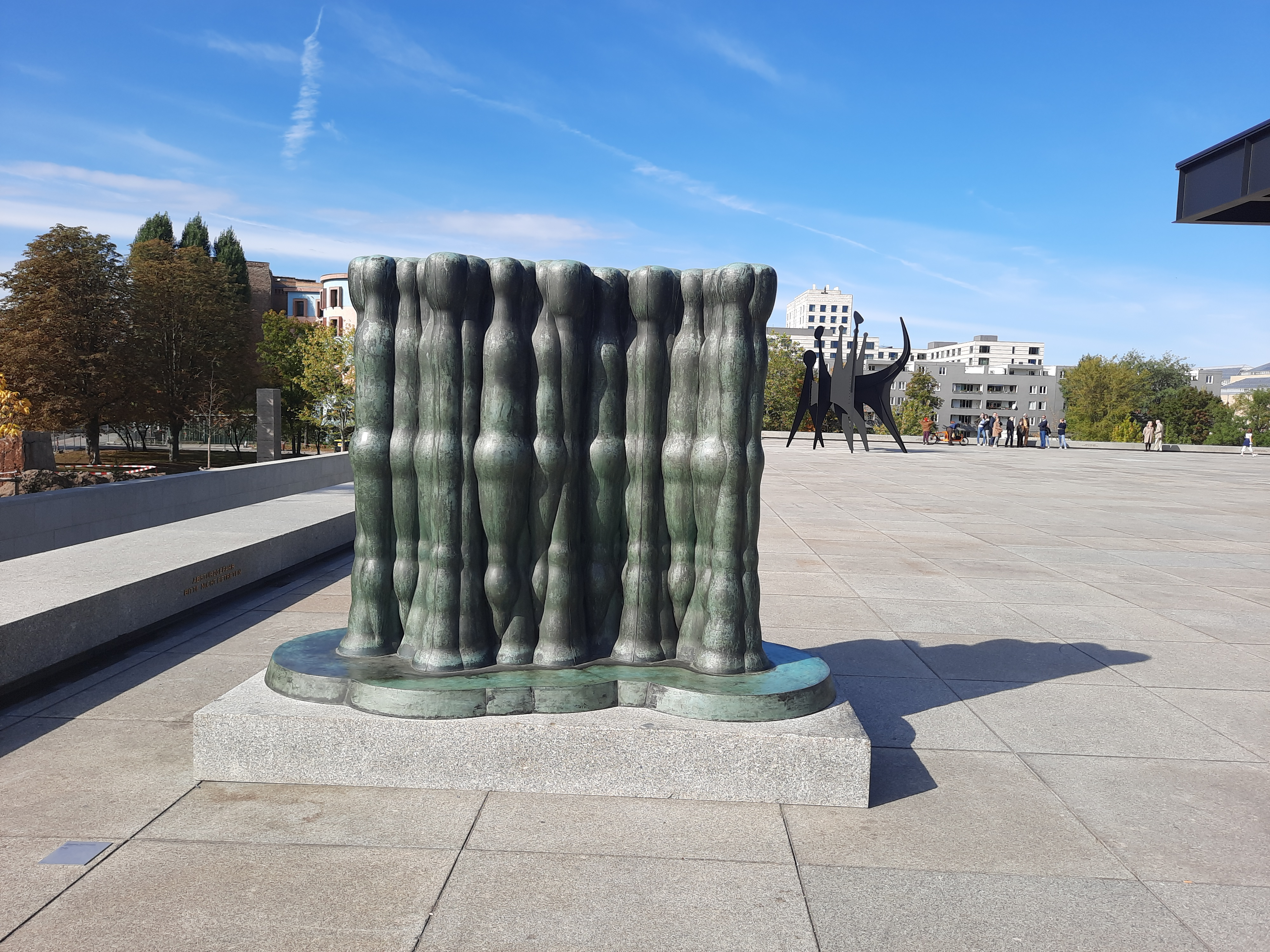
  Polis (1965–1968), Neue Nationalgalerie, Berlin
- Große Dreifigurengruppe (Large Group of Three Figures), from 1961, aka Dreiklang (1968), Hohe Bleichen, Heuberg, Hamburg
- Große Dreifigurengruppe (1961), Wilhelmstraße 7, and (probably) an edition of Kleine Fünffigurengruppe (Small Group of Five Figures) from 1964 in the Schlosspark Biebrich, Wiesbaden
- Große Figur 1 (1963), Skulpturenpark Sammlung Domnick in Nürtingen
- Große Dreifigurengruppe (1965), Berliner Allee 14, Düsseldorf
- Polis (1965–1968), erection on the rooftop plaza on the occasion of the opening of the Neue Nationalgalerie, Kulturforum, Berlin
- Kopf mit tiefenräumlichen Flächen I (Head with Deep Spatial Surfaces), from 1969/1982, in a courtyard of the Paul-Löbe-Haus, part of the German Bundestag, Berlin
- Große Dreiergruppe für Agora (1980), Marktplatz, City hall Heilbronn
- Gruppe (1982), Mercedesstraße, Cannstatter Wasen, Stuttgart
- Große Figur (1982), Pfahlplätzchen, Bamberg
- Menschenknäuel (Tangle of People), date unknown, in the Kurpark, Bad Wildungen
- [to be expanded]

=== Greece ===
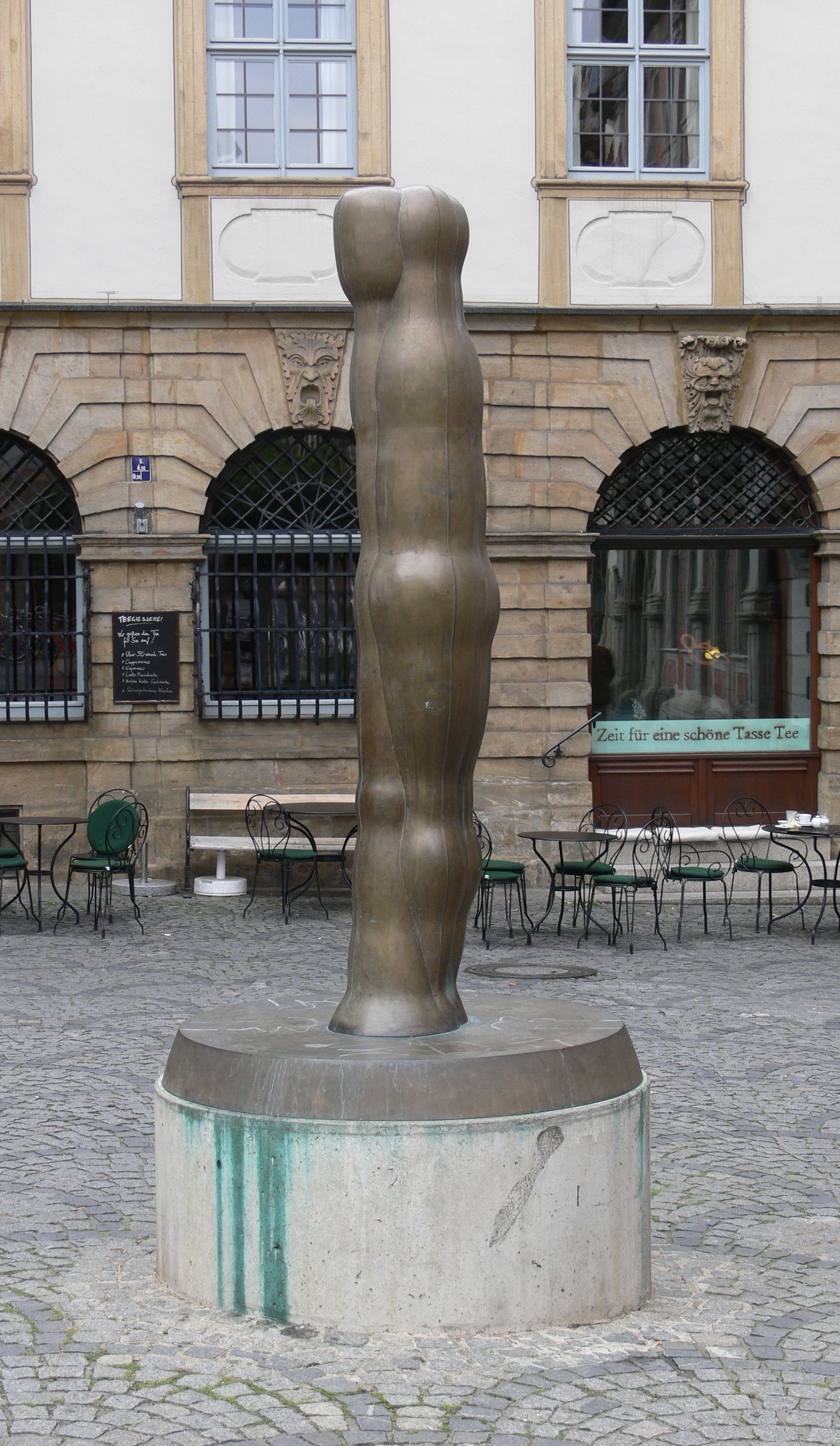
- Große Figur (1982), Pfahlplätzchen, Bamberg
  Group of Four Figures (1959–1960), MOMus – Museum of Modern Art – Costakis Collection, Thessaloniki;

=== The Netherlands ===
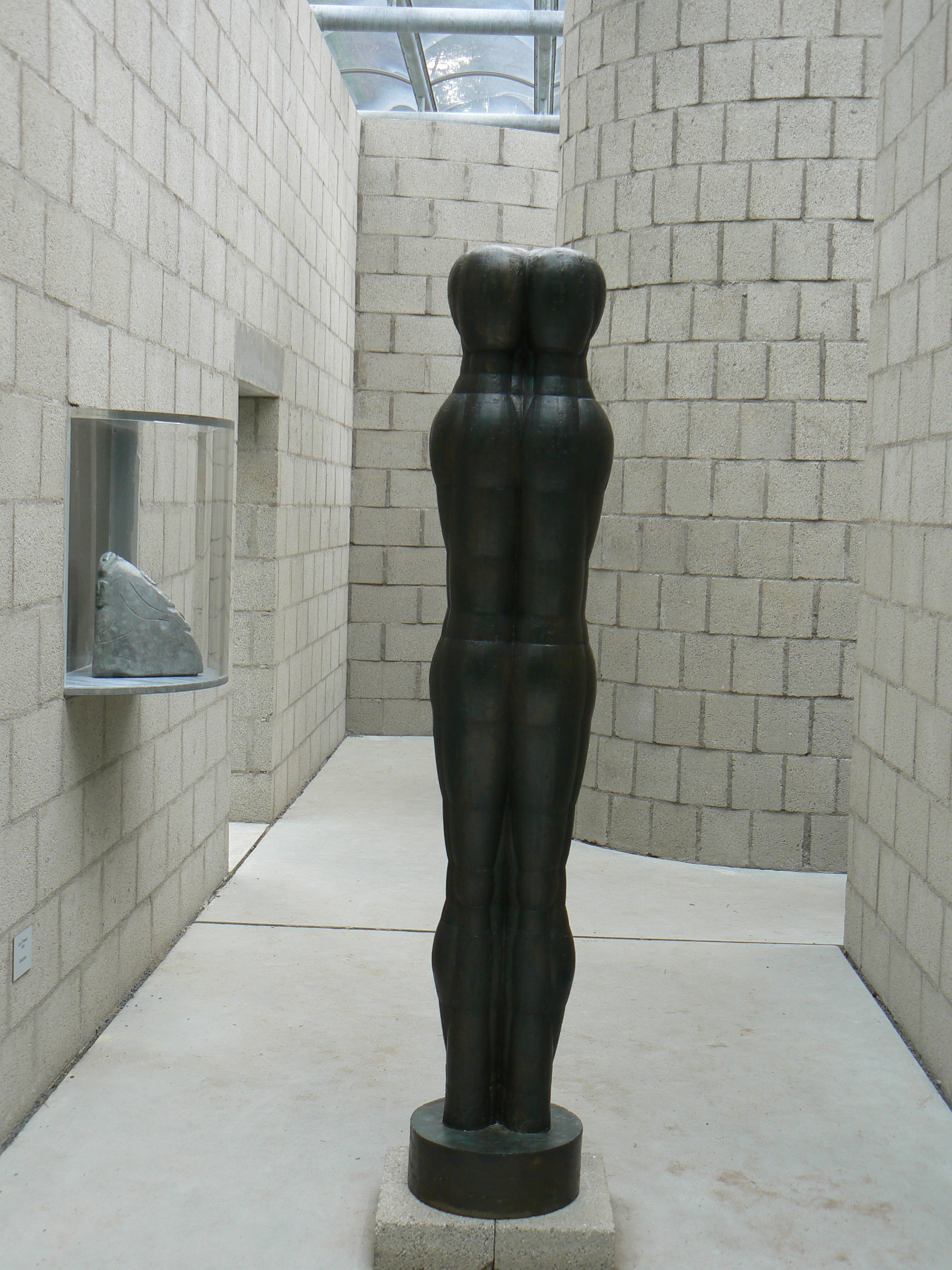
- Große Figur (1958), Kröller-Müller Museum, Otterlo
  Große Figur (Large Figure), 1958, Aldo van Eyck pavilion, sculpture garden of the Kröller-Müller Museum, Otterlo

== See also ==
- Joannis Avramidis | Ausstellungsfilm, Leopold Museum exhibition film (youtube.com) – in German
- Joannis Avramidis at LEOPOLD MUSEUM, theartVIEw (youtube.com)
- A Forest of Sculptures – The Simon Spierer Collection, work recounted by Tony Cragg (youtube.com)
- Joannis Avramidis: Der „Helene“ unter Österreichs Bildhauern, newsletter (in German), ARTinWORDS GmbH, 2017

== Stamp ==
A special edition postage stamp was created in 2018 by the Austrian Postal Service (in German : Österreichische Post) featuring Joannis Avramidis's Großer Kopf (Large Head), part of the series „Moderne Kunst in Österreich“ (Modern Art in Austria).

== Trivia ==
- A Pair of Bumbling Thieves Nearly Melted Down $1 Million Worth of Artwork Thinking It Was Scrap Metal (artnet.com)
