= Bought priesthood =

Bought priesthood is a term originating with the United States labor press in the mid-19th century and popularized again more recently by intellectuals like Noam Chomsky. It refers to the constellation of technocrats, columnists, pundits, university professors, public intellectuals, business lobbyists and so on who benefit from the political status quo and use their position to defend and support it.

The bought priesthood represents the flip side of McCarthyism and the Hollywood blacklist, which sought to marginalize public figures whose beliefs and advocacy were deemed to threaten or undermine the political status quo.

In a 1994 essay, Chomsky defined the term this way:

The labor press also condemned what they called the "bought priesthood," referring to the media and the universities and the intellectual class, that is, the apologists who sought to justify the absolute despotism that was the new spirit of the age and to instill its sordid and demeaning values.
