= Internationales Pfingstturnier Wiesbaden =

German horse show

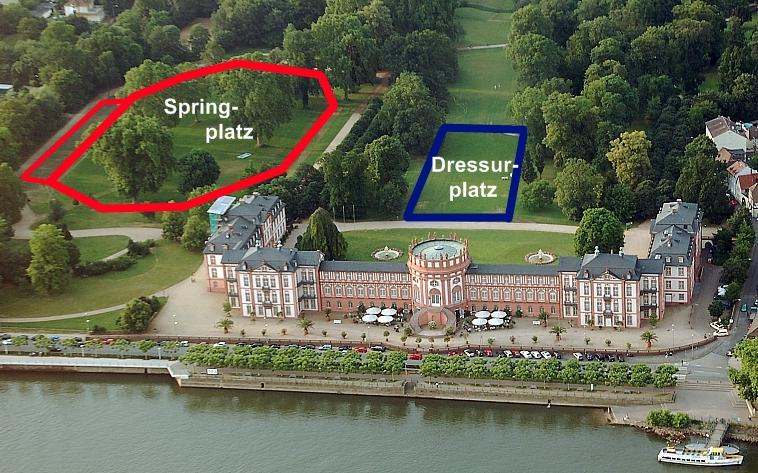
- Position of the event locations for jumping (left) and dressage
- Status: active
- Genre: Horse show
- Date: Pentecost weekend
- Frequency: Annually
- Venue: Schlosspark Biebrich
- Locations: Wiesbaden, Hesse
- Country: Germany
- Inaugurated: 1929
- Organiser: Wiesbadener Reit- und Fahr-Club
- Sponsor: Dyckerhoff family

Internationales Pfingstturnier Wiesbaden (International Pentecost Tournament Wiesbaden) is an international horse show which is held annually at the Schlosspark Biebrich in Wiesbaden, on the Pentecost weekend. The competition dates back to 1929. It is run by the Wiesbadener Reit- und Fahr-Club (WRFC), and has tournaments in dressage, show jumping, eventing and vaulting. In 2019, the event was officially named Longines PfingstTurnier Wiesbaden.

== History ==
Internationales Pfingstturnier Wiesbaden, a horse show at Schlosspark Biebrich in Wiesbaden, dates back to 1929. It is run by the Wiesbadener Reit- und Fahr-Club (WRFC). In the beginning, it was held at different locations. After World War II, Wilhelm Gustav Dyckerhoff suggested to use the Schlosspark Biebrich, and the first Pfingstturnier there was held in 1949. The event has traditionally been sponsored by the Dyckerhoff family. Competitions are held in dressage, show jumping, eventing and vaulting.

In 2019, the event was renamed Longines PfingstTurnier Wiesbaden, to honour a new main sponsor Longines. In 2020 and 2021, the event had to be cancelled due to the restrictions in the COVID-19 pandemic.

== Categories ==
=== Grand Prix Spécial ===
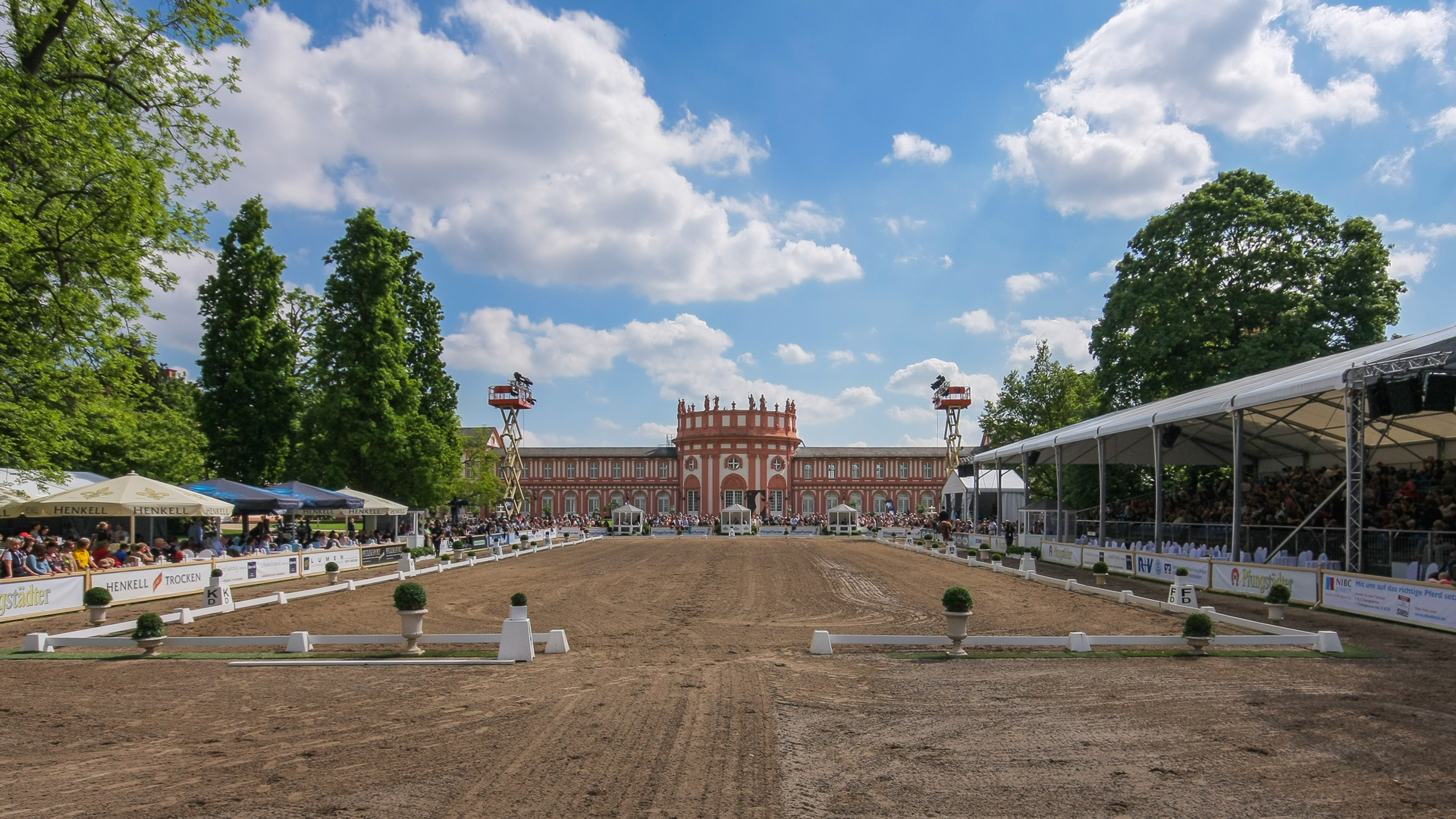
Dressage arena on the park side of Schloss Biebrich

The Grand Prix Spécial is the most important dressage competition of the Pfingstturnier. It is scheduled on Sunday afternoon, with prize money of 26,000 Euro as of 2018.

Winners (from 1989):

- 1989: (Germany) Nicole Uphoff-Becker with Rembrandt
- 1990: unknown
- 1991: unknown
- 1992: (Germany) Monica Theodorescu with Grunox
- 1993: (Germany) Isabell Werth with Gigolo FRH
- 1994: (Germany) Nicole Uphoff-Becker with Rembrandt
- 1995: (Germany) Nadine Capellmann-Biffar with My Lord
- 1996: (Germany) Monica Theodorescu with Grunox
- 1997: (Germany) Monica Theodorescu with Grunox
- 1998: (Germany) Isabell Werth with Gigolo FRH
- 1999: (Germany) Isabell Werth with Antony FRH
- 2000: (Germany) Isabell Werth with Gigolo FRH
- 2001: (Germany) Monica Theodorescu with Renaissance Fleur TS
- 2002: (Netherlands) Ellen Bontje with Silvano N
- 2003: (Germany) Isabell Werth with Satchmo
- 2004: (Denmark) Andreas Helgstrand with Cavan (75,720 %)
- 2005: (Denmark) Andreas Helgstrand with Don Schufro (75,160 %)
- 2006: (Germany) Isabell Werth with Warum nicht FRH (74,560 %)
- 2007: (Germany) Isabell Werth with Satchmo (76,640 %)
- 2008: (Germany) Isabell Werth with Warum nicht FRH (78,000 %)
- 2009: (Germany) Isabell Werth with Warum nicht FRH (76,708 %)
- 2010: (Germany) Isabell Werth with Satchmo (74,583 %)
- 2011: (Germany) Matthias Alexander Rath with Totilas (81,479 %)
- 2012: France with Riwera (71,333 %)
- 2013: cancelled due to bad weather
- 2014: (Germany) Matthias Alexander Rath with Totilas (83,196 %)
- 2015: (Germany) Isabell Werth with Don Johnson FRH (77,039 %)
- 2016: (Germany) Isabell Werth with Weihegold OLD (79,804 %)
- 2017: (Germany) Sönke Rothenberger with Favourit (73,843 %)
- 2018: (Germany) Dorothee Schneider with Faustus (76,000 %)
- 2019: (Germany) Isabell Werth with DSP Quantaz (76,255 %)

=== Jumping ===
==== Großer Preis von Wiesbaden ====
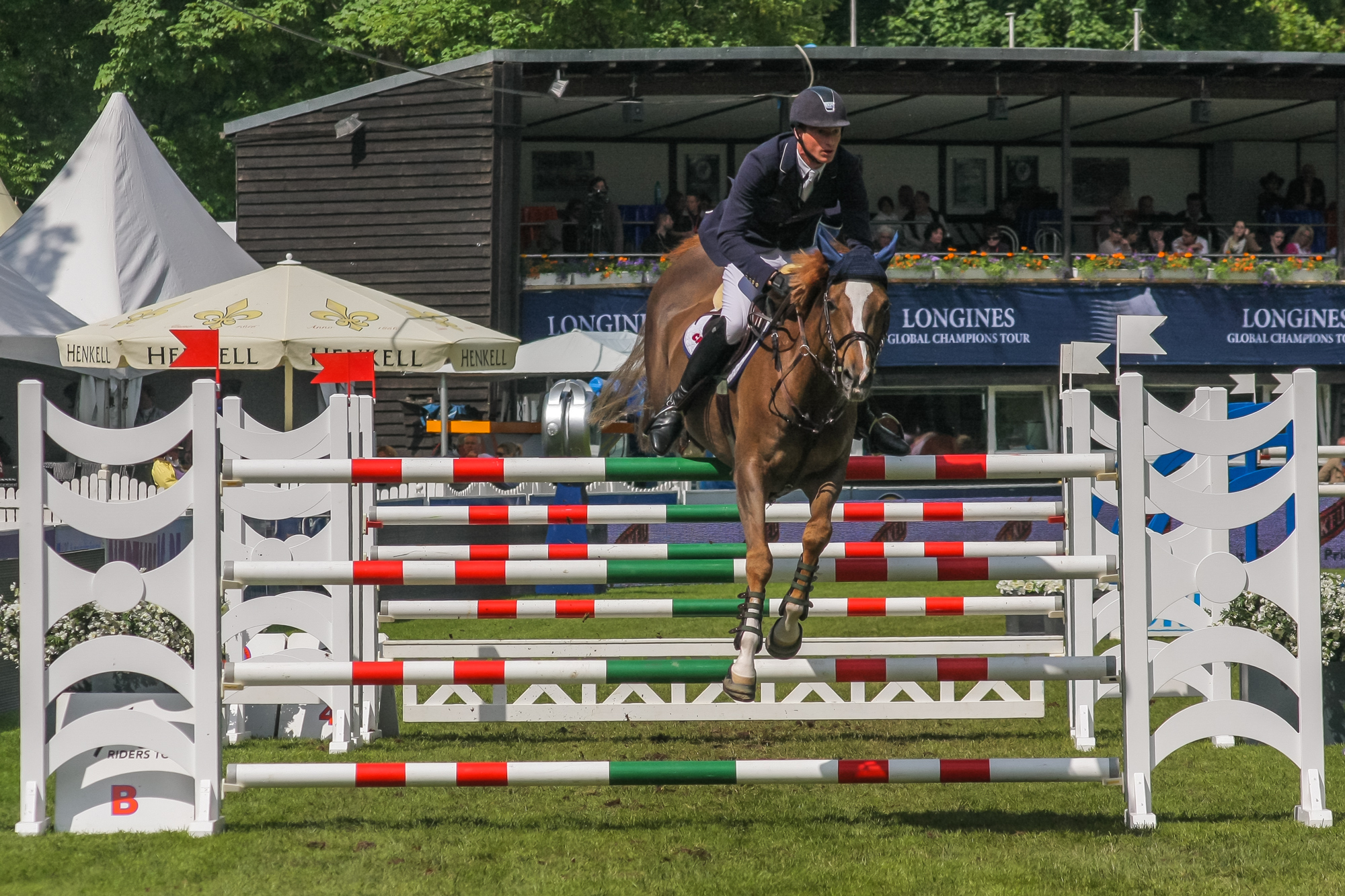
Daniel Deußer with Mouse at the 2013 Pfingstturnier

The jumping competition Großer Preis von Wiesbaden has been held from 1958 and is the most important show jumping event with the highest prize money. In the years 2012 and 2013, it was named Preis der Landeshauptstadt Wiesbaden. It is regularly held as the conclusion of the event. It was in counted towards the Riders Tour from 2001 to 2018. In the first year, the prize money was 10.000 DM, and in 2018 it was 150,000 Euro.

Winners from 1958 to 2012 have included:

- 1958: (Germany) Hans Günter Winkler with Halla
- 1959: (Germany) Fritz Thiedemann with Finale
- 1960: (United States) William Steinkraus with Riviera Wonder
- 1961: (Germany) Alwin Schockemöhle with Bachus
- 1962: (Germany) Hauke Schmidt with Arabella
- 1963: (Germany) Karl-Heinz Giebmanns with Sandro
- 1964: (Italy) Stefano Angioni with Canio
- 1965: (Germany) Hartwig Steenken with Fairness
- 1966: (United States) Frank Chapot with San Lucas
- 1967: (Netherlands) Anton Ebben with Kairouan
- 1968: (Germany) Manfred Kloess with Antea
- 1969: (Germany) Alwin Schockemöhle with Donald Rex
- 1970: (Germany) Alwin Schockemöhle with Donald Rex
- 1971: (Germany) Hugo Simon with Fair Lady
- 1972: (United States) Kathy Kusner with Triple Crown
- 1973: (Germany) Gerd Wiltfang with Askan
- 1974: (Netherlands) Arno Neesen with Jumping Amsterdam
- 1975: Ireland with Boomerang
- 1976: (United States) Buddy Brown with A Little Bit
- 1977: (Germany) Hendrik Schulze-Siehoff with Sarto
- 1978: (Netherlands) Henk Nooren with Pluco
- 1979: (Denmark) Gilles Bertrán de Balanda with Galoubet and
  Ireland Captain Con Power with Rock Barton
- 1980: (Germany) Peter Schmitz with Diavolo
- 1981: (Germany) Jürgen Ernst with Largo
- 1982: (Germany) Ulrich Meyer zu Bexten with Magister
- 1983: (Austria) Thomas Frühmann with Bandit
- 1984: Mexico with Massacre
- 1985: (Netherlands) Rob Ehrens with Oscar Drum
- 1986: (Australia) Jeff McVean with Fürst Z
- 1987: (Germany) Helena Weinberg with Just Malone
- 1988: (Germany) Franke Sloothaak with Aramis
- 1989: (Austria) Thomas Frühmann with Grandeur
- 1990: (Germany) Elmar Gundel with Prints
- 1991: (Austria) Hugo Simon with Amaretto D
- 1992: (Mexico) Victor Alvez Teixera with Attack Z
- 1993: (Brazil) Rodrigo Pessoa with Special Envoy
- 1994: (Netherlands) Piet Raijmakers with Amadeus Z
- 1995: (Switzerland) Thomas Fuchs with Major AC Folien
- 1996: (Germany) Ludger Beerbaum with Ratina Z
- 1997: (Germany) Markus Beerbaum with Lady Weingard
- 1998: (Brazil) Rodrigo Pessoa with Lianos
- 1999: (Netherlands) Emil Hendrix with Finesse
- 2000: (Germany) Ralf Runge with Frederic
- 2001: (Netherlands) Emilie Tacken with Miss Montana
- 2002: (Germany) Ludger Beerbaum with Champion du Lys
- 2003: (Germany) Marcus Ehning with Anka
- 2004: (Germany) Alois Pollmann-Schweckhorst with Diamonds Daylight
- 2005: (Germany) Meredith Michaels-Beerbaum with Checkmate
- 2006: (Germany) René Tebbel with Farina
- 2007: (Ukraine) Grégory Wathelet with Lantinus
- 2008: (Germany) Meredith Michaels-Beerbaum with Checkmate
- 2009: (Germany) Marcus Ehning with Vulkano FRH
- 2010: (Austria) Denis Lynch with Abbervail van het Dingeshof
- 2011: (Germany) Ludger Beerbaum with Chaman
- 2012: (Portugal) Luciana Diniz with Lennox
- 2013: (Republic of Ireland) Cameron Hanley with Antello Z
- 2014: (Germany) Toni Haßmann with Classic Man V
- 2015: (Saudi Arabia) Kamal Bahamdan with Noblesse des Tess
- 2016: (Germany) Patrick Stühlmeyer with Lacan
- 2017: (Germany) Holger Wulschner with Catch Me T
- 2018: (Germany) Christian Ahlmann with Clintrexo Z
- 2019: (United States) Chloe Reid with Luis P
