= Signs of AI writing =

Resource on the English Wikipedia

"Signs of AI writing" (Note: The full title of the page is "Wikipedia:Signs of AI writing", containing the wiki namespace.) (abbreviated as AISIGNS or as wikilink WP:AISIGNS) is a community-maintained resource on English Wikipedia that lists writing and formatting conventions commonly found in text generated by large language models. Created in 2023, the page began to receive significant media coverage in 2025.

== Contents ==
The page lists fundamental writing features of LLMs, including the placement of "undue emphasis on symbolism and importance", frequent use of the rule of three, and the use of negative parallelism. These signs of AI writing typically have a longer duration than superficial signs, such as em dashes, which began to be used less by AI chatbots after they were identified as an indicator of AI.

== Impact ==
The list is used by a Claude plugin to help make text generated by large language models sound more human-like.

== See also ==
- Artificial intelligence in Wikimedia projects
- Perennial sources list
