= Artificial intelligence in Wikimedia projects =

AI in wiki-based volunteer content projects

Some editors of Wikimedia projects use artificial intelligence (AI) and machine learning programs to edit existing articles or create new ones.

Some applications of artificial intelligence, like using large language models (LLMs) to create new articles from scratch, have been more controversial than others for the Wikipedia community. In August 2025, English Wikipedia adopted a policy that allowed editors to nominate suspected LLM-generated articles for speedy deletion. This was followed by a March 2026 decision to prohibit the use of LLMs to generate or rewrite article content, with exceptions for copyediting one's own writing and machine translation from another language's Wikipedia.

Wikipedia has also been a significant source of training data for some of the earliest artificial intelligence projects. This has received mixed reactions including concern about companies not citing Wikipedia when relying on it to answer a question as well as Wikipedia's increased costs from data scraping.

== AI usage on Wikipedia ==
=== Earliest use of automated tools, machine learning and AI ===
Since 2002, bots have been allowed to run on Wikipedia but must be approved and supervised by a human. A bot created in 2002, rambot, transformed census data into short new articles about towns in the United States; the vast majority of town, city, and county articles were started by it. Fighting vandalism has been a major focus of machine learning and AI bots and tools. The 2007 ClueBot relied on simple heuristics to identify likely vandalism, while its 2010 successor, ClueBot NG, uses machine learning through an artificial neural network. Machine translation software has also been used by Wikimedia contributors for a number of years.

Aaron Halfaker's Objective Revision Evaluation Service (ORES) project was launched in late 2015 as an artificial intelligence service for grading the quality of Wikipedia edits.

=== Generative AI and LLMs ===
In 2022, the public release of ChatGPT inspired more experimentation with AI and writing Wikipedia articles. A debate was sparked about whether and to what extent such large language models are suitable for such purposes in light of their tendency to generate plausible-sounding misinformation, including fake references; to generate prose that is not encyclopedic in tone; and to reproduce biases. An early experiment on December 6, 2022 by a Wikipedia contributor named Richard Knipel occurred when he created the article "Artwork title" using ChatGPT for the initial draft. Another editor who experimented with this early version of ChatGPT said that ChatGPT's overview of "Weaponized incompetence" was decent, but that the citations were fabricated.

Since 2023, work has been done to draft an English Wikipedia policy regarding ChatGPT and similar LLMs, at times recommending that users who are unfamiliar with LLMs should avoid using them due to the aforementioned risks, as well as noting the potential for libel or copyright infringement. In early 2023, the Wiki Education Foundation reported that some experienced editors found AI to be useful in starting drafts or creating new articles. It said that ChatGPT "knows" what Wikipedia articles look like and can easily generate one that is written in the style of Wikipedia, but warned that ChatGPT had a tendency to use promotional language, among other issues. In 2023, a ban on AI was deemed "too harsh" by the community given the productivity benefits it offered editors.

Miguel García, a former Wikimedia member from Spain, said in 2024 that when ChatGPT was originally launched, the number of AI-generated articles on the site peaked. He added that the rate of AI articles has now stabilized due to the community's efforts to combat it. He said that majority of the articles that have no sources are deleted instantly or are nominated for deletion. In October 2024, a study by Princeton University found that about 5% of 3,000 newly created articles (created in August 2024) on English Wikipedia were created using AI.The study said that some of the AI articles were on innocuous topics and that AI had likely only been used to assist in writing. For some other articles, AI had been used to promote businesses or political interests. In October 2024, Ilyas Lebleu, founder of AI Cleanup, said that they and their fellow editors noticed a pattern of unnatural writing that could be connected to ChatGPT. They added that AI is able to mass-produce content that sounds real while being completely fake, leading to the creation of hoax articles on Wikipedia that they were tasked to delete.

In June 2025, the Wikimedia Foundation started testing a "Simple Article Summaries" feature which would provide AI-generated summaries of Wikipedia articles, similar to Google Search's AI Overviews. The decision was met with immediate and harsh criticism from some Wikipedia editors, who called the feature a "ghastly idea" and a "PR hype stunt." They criticized a perceived loss of trust in the site due to AI's tendency to hallucinate and questioned the necessity of the feature. The criticism led the Wikimedia Foundation to halt the rollout of Simple Article Summaries that same month while still expressing interest in integrating generative AI more into Wikipedia. The project hints at tensions within the community and with the Foundation over when to use AI.

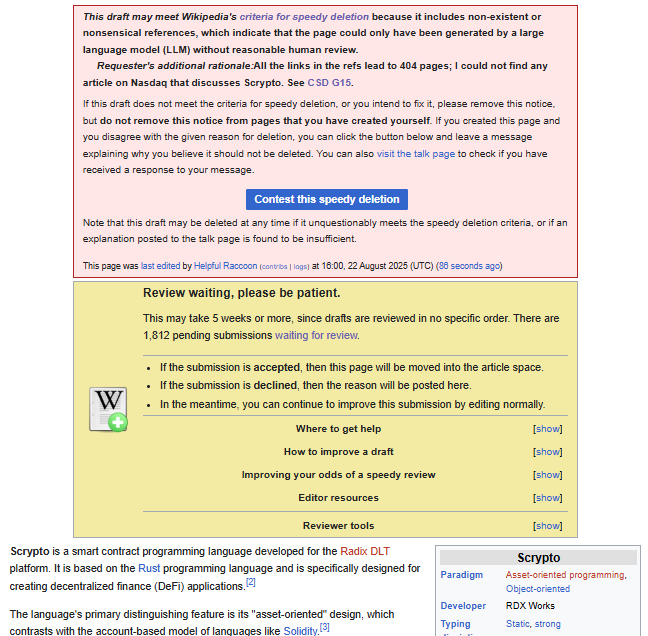
AI-generated draft article getting nominated for speedy deletion under G15 criteria

In August 2025, the English Wikipedia community created a policy that allowed users to nominate suspected AI-generated articles for speedy deletion. During the discussion on implementing the speedy deletion policy, one user, who is an article reviewer, said that he is "flooded non-stop with horrendous drafts" created using AI. Other users said that AI articles have a large amount of "lies and fake references" and that it takes a significant amount of time to fix the issues.

In January 2026, the Wiki Education Foundation continued to caution against copying and pasting outputs from generative AI into Wikipedia and to avoid it for creating new articles explaining that the text often failed verification with the sources provided. The foundation created a training module that encourages editors to use AI for identifying gaps in articles, finding access to sources and finding relevant sources. In March 2026, the English Wikipedia community prohibited the use of AI to add content to articles, with exceptions for copy editing and machine translation from another language's Wikipedia. The English Wikipedia community holds the position that LLMs often violate core content policies.

=== AI detection ===
On English Wikipedia the detection of AI or LLM additions are accomplished through a combination of specialized software, wiki-scripts, and human detection. In 2023, members of the English Wikipedia community created a WikiProject named WikiProject AI Cleanup to assist in the removal of poor quality AI content from Wikipedia. English Wikipedia created a guide on how to spot signs of AI-generated writing, titled "Signs of AI writing". Editors might recognize AI-generated articles because they use citations that are not related to the subject of the article or fabricated citations or the wording has particular quirks. If an article uses language that reads like an LLM response to a user, such as "Here is your Wikipedia article on" or "Up to my last training update", the article is typically tagged for speedy deletion. Other signs of AI use include excessive use of em dashes, overuse of the word "moreover", promotional material in articles that describes something as "breathtaking" and formatting issues like using curly quotation marks instead of straight versions.

The Wikipedia Edit filter (also known as the Abuse Filter) is an automated software that analyzes and logs edits made on Wikipedia against a predefined set of conditions to detect and prevent harmful or disruptive editing such as possible AI-generated text (implemented on December 5, 2025) and possible AI-sourced citations (implemented on September 16, 2026).

Wikipedia's LLM Paste Check is a built-in visual editor tool that triggers a warning prompt when users paste text containing metadata from major generative AI chatbots. It was deployed as a default-on feature for English Wikipedia on 24 September 2026 and deployed as a default-on feature for all other language Wikipedias on 8 October 2026.

== Using Wikipedia for artificial intelligence ==
A 2017 paper described Wikipedia as the mother lode for human-generated text available for machine learning. In the development of the Google's Perspective API that identifies toxic comments in online forums, a dataset containing hundreds of thousands of Wikipedia talk page comments with human-labelled toxicity levels was used.

As of 2023, subsets of the Wikipedia corpus were considered one of the largest well-curated data sets available for AI training, used to train every LLM to-date according to Stephen Harrison. This use of Wikipedia was divisive as of 2023.

The Wikimedia Foundation and many of its projects supporters worry that attribution to Wikipedia articles is missing in many large-language models like ChatGPT (as well as AI like Siri and Alexa). While Wikipedia's licensing policy lets anyone use its texts, including in modified forms, it does have the condition that credit is given, implying that using its contents in answers by AI models without clarifying the sourcing may violate its terms of use. The Foundation expressed concern that without attribution, people will not visit the site as much or be as motivated to donate to support the project if they do not know when they are benefiting from it. They also noticed an 8% decrease in visitors to Wikipedia in 2025 which they attributed both to the increased popularity of generative AI and social media.

In 2025, the Wikimedia Foundation has cited absorbing increased costs associated with scraping by artificial intelligence companies and is looking to provide training data to companies more efficiently, and make its data more useful including with special licensing deals and paid APIs to limit and recover some of the costs of providing information to AI companies.

== In other projects ==
Wikimedia Commons, a repository of freely-licensed media, permits uploading AI-generated files, provided they have a clear educational purpose and do not violate local copyright laws on AI media. Commons media has also been used as training data for artificial intelligence text-to-image models, which caused a 50% increase in bandwidth consumption since January 2024.

Wikidata, a free knowledge graph, received an updated vector semantic search system in 2025, making it easier for large language models to process the data. This implementation was part of the Wikidata Embedding Project, launched in partnership with DataStax and Jina AI.

== Reactions ==
In 2023, Slate Magazine cited longtime Wikipedians like Richard Knipel and Andrew Lih, worried about Wikipedia "losing its original bold spirit and developing a knee-jerk resistance to change." Slate argued that AI should be embraced with guidelines like transparency and the need for human supervision.

In 2025, Jimmy Wales proposed using AI to provide customized default feedback when drafts are rejected, spot inconsistencies and point out missing information in articles, and summarize discussions between editors so that editors new to a discussion could get quickly caught up on the debate.

In August 2025, Wikimedia editor Ilyas Lebleu believed that the bigger problem of AI use will continue and that speedy deletion has been a "band-aid" with some AI articles nominated for regular deletion remaining up for a week until the discussion can finish.

== See also ==
- Open-source artificial intelligence
