= Peter Schmitz =

German UN official

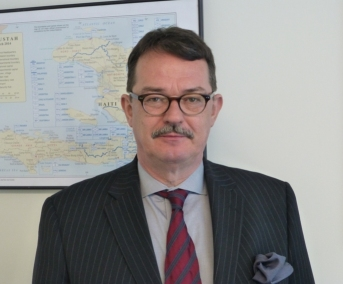
- Born: 14 December 1954 (age 71); Dortmund, West Germany
- Occupations: Former Senior UN Official, United Nations

Peter Schmitz (born 14 December 1954 in Dortmund) is a retired United Nations official, and former Director of the Europe and Latin America Division, Office of Operations, Department of Peacekeeping Operations.

Schmitz holds an MA in political science from the University of Hamburg. He joined the United Nations Secretariat in August 1984, and first worked in various functions in Protocol and the Department of General Assembly Affairs.

From October 1989 to November 1992, Mr. Schmitz served as Senior Political Affairs Officer in the Office of the Secretary-General in Afghanistan and Pakistan (OSGAP). Subsequently, until April 1996, he served as DPKO Desk Officer for the United Nations operations in the former Yugoslavia (UNPROFOR). From May 1996 until the end of 1999, he was the Senior Political Adviser of the United Nations Peacekeeping Force in Cyprus (UNFICYP).

From January 2000, he acted as Special Assistant to the Under-Secretary-General for Peacekeeping Operations. Subsequently, he worked with the Deputy Secretary-General on the implementation of the "Brahimi Plan" on the reform of the Department of Peacekeeping Operations (DPKO). From February 2001 until November 2005, Mr. Schmitz served as Principal Officer in the Office of the Chef de Cabinet of Secretary-General Kofi Annan.

From that time until 2009, he was the Chief of Staff of the United Nations Stabilization Mission in Haiti (MINUSTAH). Then, from March 2009 until October 2011, he served as Chief of Staff of the United Nations Assistance Mission in Afghanistan (UNAMA).

Peter Schmitz is married and has two children. He is a lifelong supporter of Borussia Dortmund.

== Publications and articles ==
"Multis und Menschenrechte in der Dritten Welt", Lamuv Verlag, 1985
