= Schlosspark Biebrich =

Park in Hesse, Germany

Schlosspark
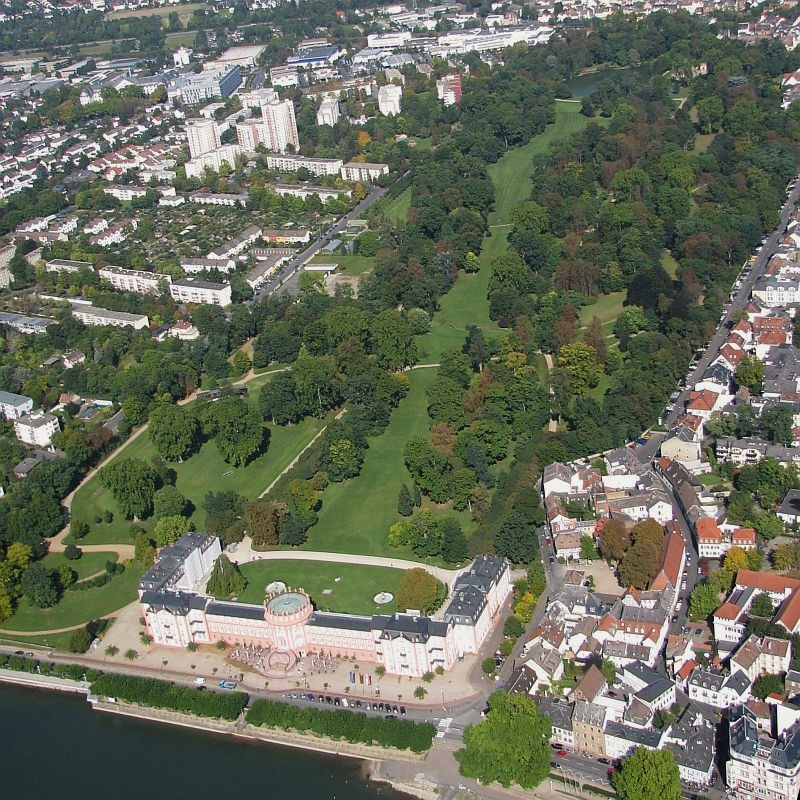
- Aerial view of the park with the schloss on the Rhine
- Interactive map of Schlosspark
- Location: Wiesbaden-Biebrich, Hesse, Germany
- Coordinates: 50°02′24″N 08°14′04″E
- Established: 1720; 306 years ago
- Operator: Staatliche Schlösser und Gärten Hessen

The Schlosspark Biebrich (Biebrich palace park) is a park at Schloss Biebrich in Wiesbaden-Biebrich, Hesse, Germany. First designed as a French formal garden, it was expanded changed to an English landscape garden and expanded 1817 to 1823, the last project of Friedrich Ludwig von Sckell. The public park extends north of the building in the valley of the Mosbach creek for around 1,200 m and is 250 m wide. It is the venue for the annual horse show Internationales Pfingstturnier Wiesbaden.

== History ==
The Schlosspark Biebrich is a park at Schloss Biebrich in Wiesbaden-Biebrich, which began as a summer residence but was expanded to one of the residences of the Dukes of Nassau, held until 1841.

The park was first designed as a French formal garden. The area next to the palace was raised to a plateau, reached by stairs from the west. The first design was created by Maximilian von Welsch around 1720 and had a symmetric pattern of paths, framed by buildings (Orangerie) and balustrades. In 1805/06, architect Carl Florian Goetz built a romantic artificial ruin in the north, the Mosburg, surrounded by a pond. The park was damaged during the Revolutionary wars. The innovative garden architect Friedrich Ludwig von Sckell was commissioned to design the expanded park as an English landscape garden from 1817 to 1823, which became his last project.

The park is the venue of the annual Internationales Pfingstturnier Wiesbaden. The competition in dressage and show jumping on the highest level has been run by the Wiesbadener Reit- und Fahr-Club on Pentecost weekend since 1949. It attracts more than 50.000 visitors. The park was expanded once more in the 1960s by Ernst May, who was a city planner (Planungsbeauftragter) of Wiesbaden then.

The gardens are managed by the Staatliche Schlösser und Gärten Hessen and the Landesbetrieb Bau und Immobilien Hessen. They are protected as historic gardens (Gartendenkmal).

== Gallery ==
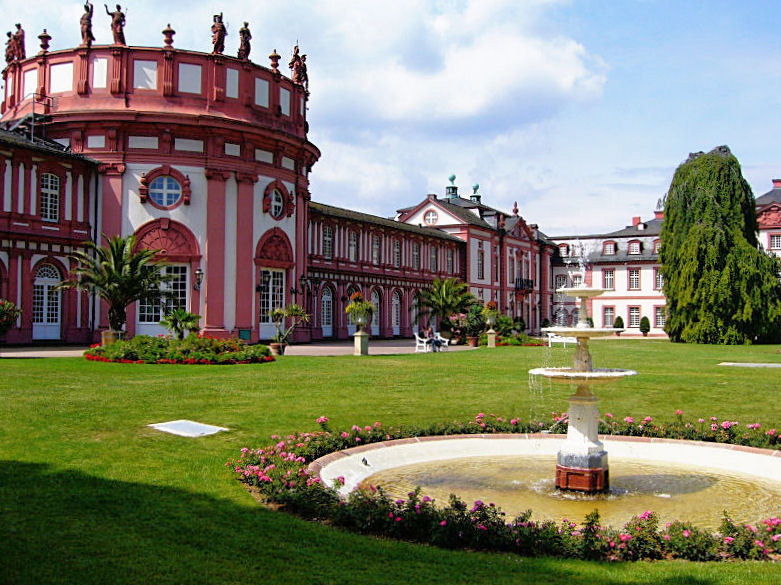
Schloss Biebrich from the park

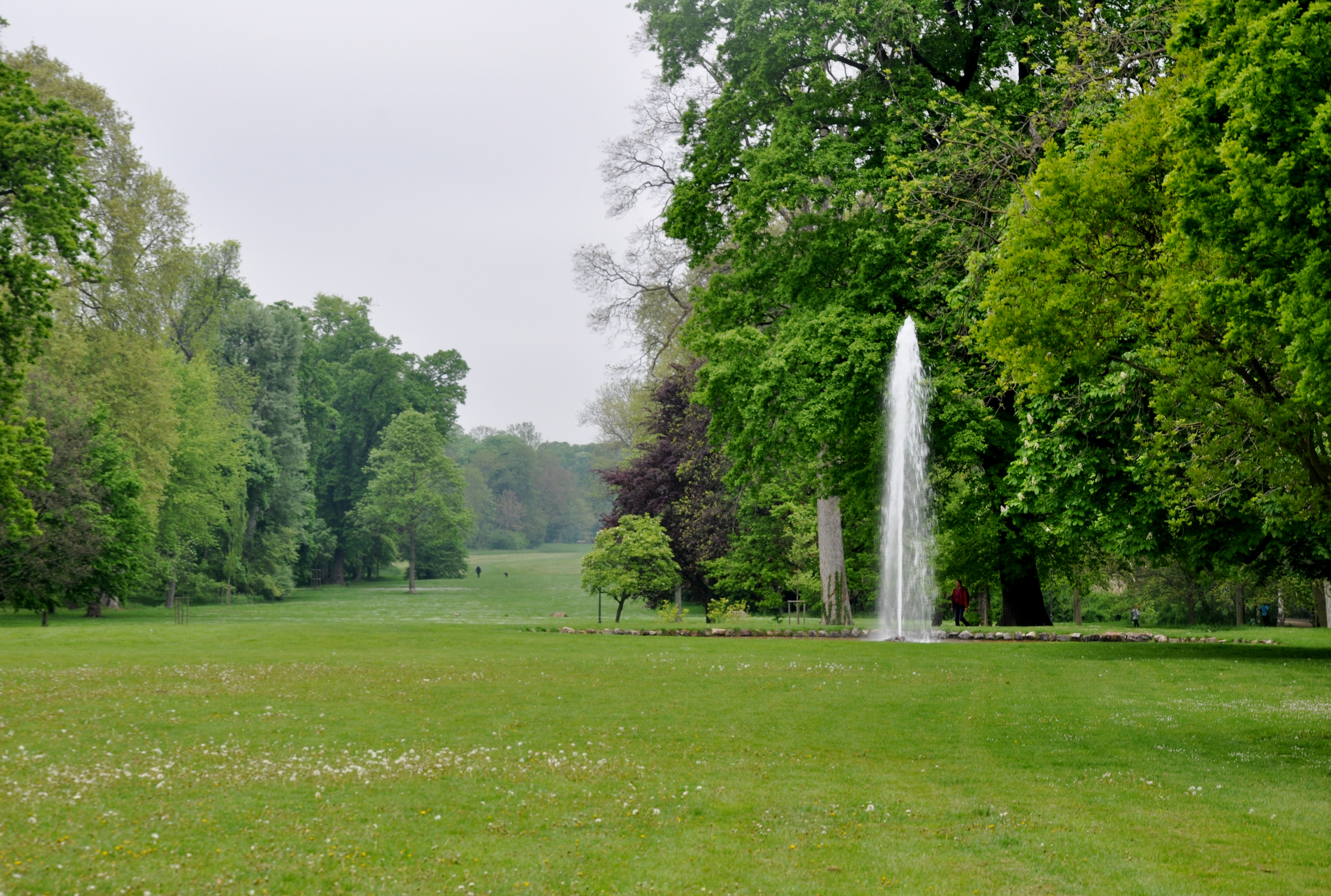
Fountain

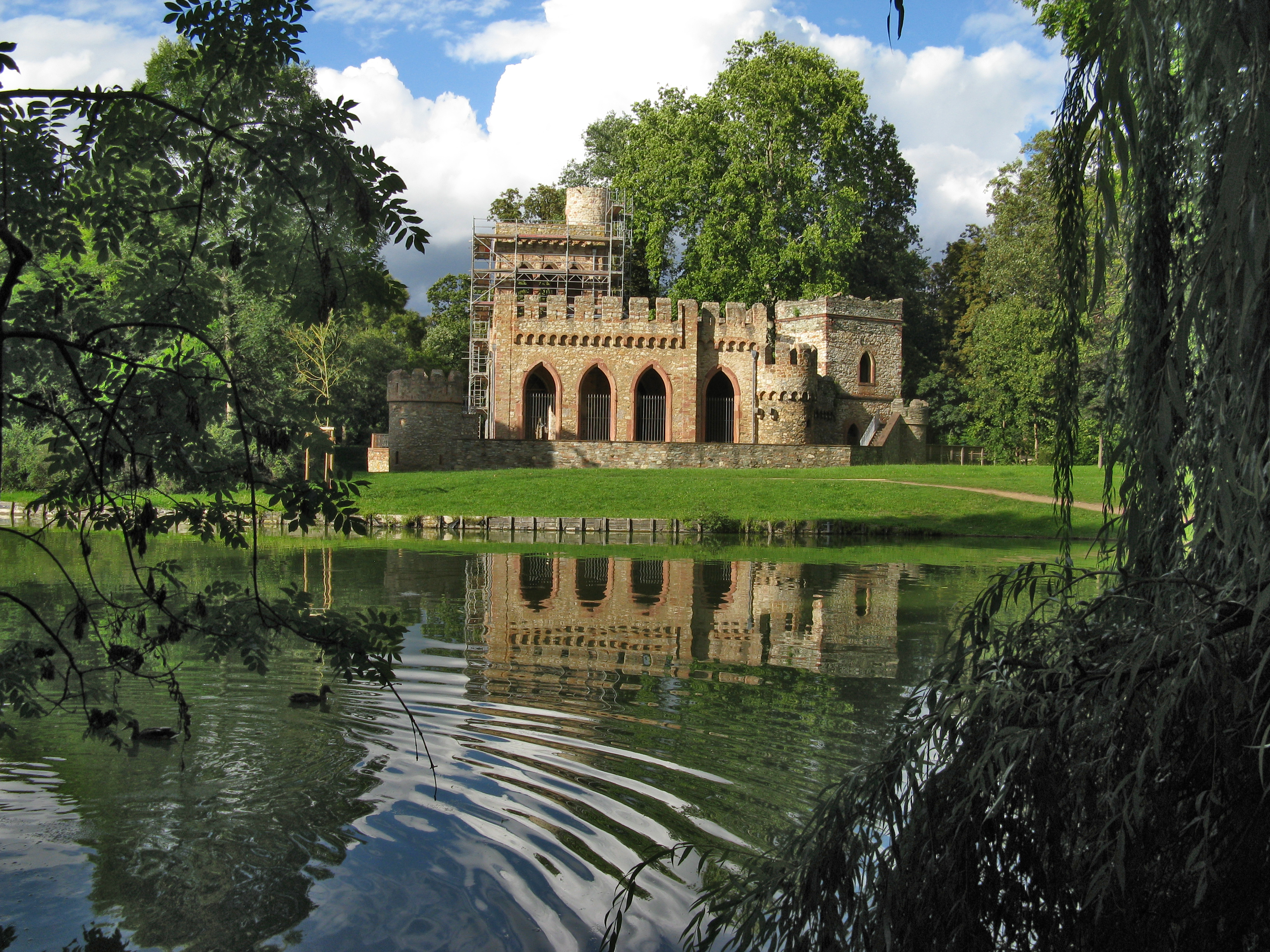
Mosburg with pond
