= Negative parallelism =

Stylistic device characteristic of LLMs

Negative parallelism is a stylistic device that defines a subject by describing what it is not as well as what it is: "it's not X, it's Y". It has also been called "antithesis", "metalinguistic negation", or "contrastive phrasing". Variations of this device include "it's not just X, it's Y" and "not X, but Y".

The device has been employed by writers such as Shakespeare ("The fault, dear Brutus, is not in our stars, but in ourselves"; Julius Caesar) or by the football coach Vince Lombardi ("Winning isn’t everything; it’s the only thing"). As a distinct element of style, however, it gained attention only in the 2020s when it became apparent that large language models (LLMs) such as ChatGPT use negative parallelism inordinately often (about three times more frequently than humans), to the point that such constructions came to be seen as a hallmark of machine-generated text.

Although it is not clear why LLMs tend to use negative parallelism to the extent that they do, a few explanations have been suggested:

- Such constructions are frequent in training data.
- During reinforcement learning, a phase in LLM training, human reviewers might grade negative parallelism higher because it conveys "the impression of nuance and insight".
- Negative parallelism could be an artefact of how LLMs generate text. Fundamentally, they do so by "next-token prediction", choosing words in part based on how statistically likely it is that they follow the previous word, as well as how likely it is that they result in a highly-rated response. Negative parallelism could be a way for an LLM to attempt to satisfy both incentives by choosing a relatively easy-to-find (and therefore likely) negative descriptor as well as a more interesting (and therefore highly-rated) positive descriptor.

Because LLMs are increasingly trained by and based on the output of other LLMs, tics such as a preference for negative parallelisms tend to be self-reinforcing and therefore hard to root out. While this might be an advantage for those who wish to distinguish AI-generated text from human-written text, there are indications that the prevalence of negative parallelism in LLM-generated text – which is an increasing proportion of all text – might in turn be influencing human conversations, making humans more likely to adopt the style of LLMs.
