= Antithesis =

Topic in philosophy; something that is the opposite of something else

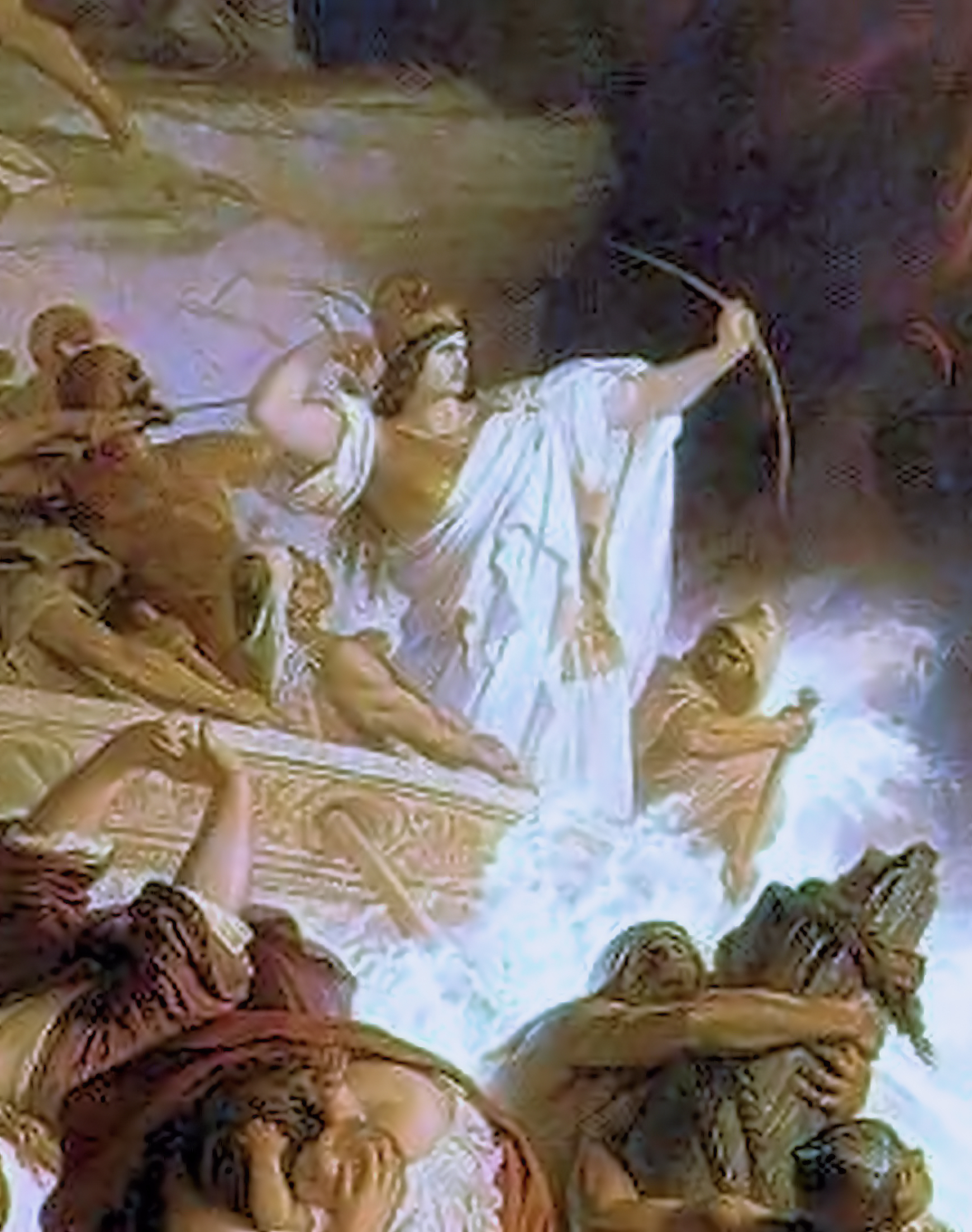
According to Herodotus, Xerxes, overlooking the Battle of Salamis and seeing the success of Artemisia I of Caria (depicted above in an 1868 painting by Wilhelm von Kaulbach, reportedly said the following antithesis: "My men have become women; and my women, men."

Antithesis (pl.: antitheses; Greek for "setting opposite", from ἀντι- "against" and θέσις "placing") is used in writing or speech either as a proposition that contrasts with or reverses some previously mentioned proposition, or when two opposites are introduced together for contrasting effect.

As a rhetorical device, antithesis is a figure of speech in which seemingly contradictory ideas, phrases, or clauses are introduced using a balanced grammatical structure. An antithesis must always contain two ideas within one statement. The ideas may not be structurally opposite, but they serve to be functionally opposite when comparing two ideas for emphasis.

According to Aristotle, the use of an antithesis makes the audience better understand the point the speaker is trying to make. Further explained, the comparison of two situations or ideas makes choosing the correct one simpler. Aristotle states that antithesis in rhetoric is similar to syllogism due to the presentation of two conclusions within a statement.

Antitheses are used to strengthen an argument by using either exact opposites or simply contrasting ideas, but can also include both. They typically make a sentence more memorable for the reader or listener through balance and emphasis of the words.

== Rhetorical antithesis ==
Antithesis has two rhetorical definitions (detailed by Rhetorica ad Herennium and Alexandrum):

- Antithesis of wording as a figure of diction involves the juxtaposing of ideas by an obvious contrast in the words, clauses, or sentences, within a parallel grammatical structure in one sentence. The following is an example solely of wording: "Let the rich and prosperous give to the poor and needy"
- Antithesis of sense as a figure of thought involves the meeting and comparison of opposing thoughts. The following is an example solely of sense: "I tended him when he was sick, but he has been the cause of very great misfortune to me." This definition is not always included in the definition of antithesis and is distinguished by some, such as Richard Sherry, with the term "antitheton."

The following is now an example of both antithesis of wording and sense: "It is not fair that my opponent should become rich by possessing what belongs to me, while I sacrifice my property and become a mere beggar;" note how the rhetorical style accompanies the comparison of thoughts. This article will mostly cover the former definition of wording; however, many examples of the figure of diction are examples of the figure of thought.

In Aristotle's Rhetoric, he defines antithesis as a construct with two unique ideas that emphasize a different element from a pair of opposites. Aristotle provides the following example:

They aided both parties—
not only those who stayed behind
but those who accompanied them:
for the latter they acquired new territory larger than that at home,
and to the former they left territory at home that was large enough

In the first example, the contrasted opposites— "stayed behind" and "accompanied them—" are bound by parallel structure and the subject of both qualifiers is written identically ("those who"). In the second example, the opposites "larger" and "large enough" are similarly contained with parallel structure but apply to different nouns: the former's subject being "the latter" and the latter's subject being "the former" (that clause being an example of antithesis in itself)

The basic formula of antithesis is X is Y; not X is not Y; for example, the phrase "Fashion is what oneself wears" can be paired with "What is unfashionable is what other people wear" to form Oscar Wilde's antithetical epigram from An Ideal Husband.

This formula can be modified in a variety of ways. A common example of this is the form not X, but Y (negative-positive) where the point made is emphasized by first being contrasted with its negative, Matthew 10:34: "I came not to bring peace but a sword." Moreover, antitheses can follow an antimetabolic scheme (typically X to Y; Y to X): "I do not live to eat, but eat to live," an example of this reversing. The inauguration speech of John F. Kennedy provides an antimetabolic and negative-positive example: "Ask not what your country can do for you – ask what you can do for your country."

Antithesis may also be combined with synonymous parallelism. In Revelation 22:11, for example, the first and second couplets are individually synonymously parallel while the couplets as a whole are antithetically parallel:

Let the evildoer still do evil,
and the filthy still be filthy,
and the righteous still do right,
and the holy still be holy.

Twentieth-century rhetorician Kenneth Burke discusses the rhetorical aesthetic and stylistic effects of antithesis in one of the most referenced passages of A Rhetoric of Motives, one of his most famous works. In that book, Burke describes how antithesis can invite people to hold an "attitude of collaborative expectancy" through the rhetorical aesthetic principle of form.

=== Progressio ===
Progressio or progression is a rhetorical device involving repeated antithesis. Thomas Wilson gives the following example:

What a boy art thou in comparison of this fellow here.
Thou sleepes: he wakes:
thou plaies: he studies:
thou art euer abroade: he is euer at home:
thou neuer waites: he still doth his attendance:
thou carest for no bodie: he doeth his duetie to all men:
thou doest what thou canst to hurt all, and please none: he doeth what he can to hurte none, and please all.

More broadly, progressio may also refer to constructing an argument around a series of comparison.

== Rhetorical use ==
Antithesis is typically used as a means to contrast two alternatives. This may be done to show sharp contrast between two options and create connections between opposite characteristics or accelerate connections between two items. For example, the phrase "United we stand, divided we fall" creates contrast between two options (unity and division) and communicates that the former is connected to one's survival (and therefore positive) while the latter is connected to one's demise (and therefore negative). When used in persuasive contexts, stark contrast can help make a statement more convincing.

Antithesis' parallelism provides a memorable structure and aids with creating rhythm.

Antithesis can be used to show magnitude or a range of options. The phrase "from the highest mountain, to the deepest valley" uses antithesis to communicate something's vast range.

== Rhetorical examples ==
Some examples of antithesis are as follows:

- "Man proposes, God disposes"
- "When all is calm, you are confused; when all is in confusion, you are calm"
- "My men have become women, and my women, men" — King Xerxes at the Battle of Salamis in 480 BC (according to Herodotus)
- "I'm not saying that this or that statue was stolen from there; I'm saying this, that you, Verres, left not one single statue in Aspendus" — Cicero, In Verrem
- "I defended the Republic as a young man; I shall not desert her now that I am old" — Cicero, 2nd Philippic
- "For many are called, but few are chosen" — Matthew 22:14 (RSVCE)
- "For now we see in a mirror dimly, but then face to face. Now I know in part; then I shall understand fully, even as I have been fully understood" — 1 Corinthians 13:12 (RSVCE)
- "He who desires peace, should prepare for war" — Vegetius, Epitoma Rei Militaris, book 3, introduction
- "Give every man thy ear, but few thy voice" — William Shakespeare, Hamlet, act 1, scene 3
- "Some rise by sin and some by virtue fall. / Some run from brakes of ice and answer none, / And some condemned for a fault alone" — William Shakespeare, Measure for Measure, act 2, scene 1
- "For contemplation he and valour formed, For softness she and sweet attractive grace; He for God only, she for God in him" — Milton, Paradise Lost
- "Give me liberty or give me death!" — Patrick Henry at the Second Virginia Convention, 1775
- "It was the best of times, it was the worst of times, it was the age of wisdom, it was the age of foolishness, it was the epoch of belief, it was the epoch of incredulity, it was the season of Light, it was the season of Darkness, it was the spring of hope, it was the winter of despair, we had everything before us, we had nothing before us, we were all going direct to Heaven, we were all going direct the other way..." — Dickens, A Tale of Two Cities (an example of progressio)
- "The world will little note, nor long remember what we say here, but it can never forget what they did here." — Abraham Lincoln, Gettysburg Address, 1863
- "Never give in — never, never, never, never, in nothing great or small, large or petty, never give in except to convictions of honour and good sense" — Winston Churchill, 1941
- "I have a dream that my four little children will one day live in a nation where they will not be judged by the color of their skin but by the content of their character" — Martin Luther King Jr., "I Have a Dream," 1963
- "We must learn to live together as brothers or perish together as fools" — Martin Luther King Jr., 1964 in St. Louis
- "Senator, in everything I said about Iraq I turned out to be right and you turned out to be wrong" — George Galloway, 2005 at a US Senate hearing

== The "Antitheses" in St Matthew's Gospel ==
Matthew's Antitheses is the traditional name given to a section of the Sermon on the Mount where Jesus takes six well known prescriptions of the Mosaic Law and calls his followers to do more than the Law requires. Protestant scholars since the Reformation have generally believed that Jesus was setting his teaching over against false interpretations of the Law current at the time. "Antithesis" was the name given by Marcion of Sinope to a manifesto in which he contrasted the Old Testament with the New Testament and defined what came to be known as Marcionism.

== In philosophical discussion ==
In dialectics (any formal system of reasoning that arrives at the truth by the exchange of logical arguments) antithesis is the juxtaposition of contrasting ideas, usually in a balanced way. The logical arguments are said to be stated in the order thesis, antithesis, synthesis.

Although this style of philosophical discussion (stating a point of view, then its opposite, and finally drawing a conclusion) was commonly used by ancient philosophers, the use of the trio "thesis, antithesis, synthesis" itself to describe it goes back only to the 18th century, to a work published in 1794 by the German philosopher Johann Gottlieb Fichte.

The phrase is sometimes incorrectly stated to originate from the German philosopher Hegel. However, Hegel never actually used the trio of terms except once in a lecture, in which he reproached Immanuel Kant for having "everywhere posited thesis, antithesis, synthesis."

== See also ==
- Alternative hypothesis
- Dialectical materialism
- Dialectic
- Opposite
- Antimetabole
- Negative parallelism
