= Glossary of poetry terms =

This is a glossary of poetry terms.

== Basic composition ==
- Accent
  - Vedic accent
- Arsis and thesis: the first and second half of a foot
- Cadence: the patterning of rhythm in poetry, or natural speech, without a distinct meter
- Catalexis: shortening of a line by one element (adjective: catalectic)
  - Acatalexis: the opposite of catalexis
  - Acephalous line: a line lacking the first element
- Line: a unit into which a poem is divided
  - Line break: the termination of the line of a poem and the beginning of a new line
- Metre (or meter): the basic rhythmic structure of a verse or lines in verse. Metres are influenced by syllables and their "weight"
- Metrical foot (a.k.a. poetic foot): the basic repeating rhythmic unit that forms part of a line of verse in most Indo-European traditions of poetry
- Prosody: the principles of metrical structure in poetry
- Stanza: a group of lines forming the basic recurring metrical unit in a poem. (cf. verse in music.)
- Syllable weight and stress: weight refers to the duration of a syllable, which can be defined by the length of a vowel; whereas stress refers to a syllable uttered in a higher pitch—or with greater emphasis—than others
  - Stressed or long syllable (Latin: longum; notation: –): a heavy syllable
  - Unstressed or short syllable (Latin: brevis; notation: ◡): a light syllable
- Verse: formally, a single metrical line. (Not to be confused with musical verse.)
  - Gāthā
  - Verse paragraph: a group of verse lines that make up a single rhetorical unit

=== Other parts ===
- Anceps: a position in a metrical pattern that can be filled by either a long or a short syllable.
- Caesura: a stop or pause in a metrical line, typically marked by punctuation.
- Canto: a long subsection of a long narrative poem such as an epic.
- End rhyme (a.k.a. tail rhyme): a rhyme occurring in the terminating word or syllable of one line in a poem with that of another line, as opposed to internal rhyme.
- End-stopping line
- Enjambment: incomplete syntax at the end of a line; the meaning runs over from one poetic line to the next, without terminal punctuation.
- Epigraph: a quotation from another literary work that is placed under the title at the beginning of a poem or section of a poem.
- Hemistich: a half of a line of verse.
- Internal rhyme: a rhyme that occurs within a single line of verse, or between internal phrases across multiple lines.
  - Off-centered rhyme: a rhyme that occurs in an unexpected place in a given line.
- Refrain: repeated lines in a poem.
- Strophe: the first section of a choral ode

== Metrical feet ==
A metrical foot (a.k.a. poetic foot) is the basic repeating rhythmic unit that forms part of a line of verse in most Indo-European traditions of poetry.

In some metres (such as the iambic trimeter) the lines are divided into double feet, called metra (singular: metron).

- Monosyllable
- Disyllable: metrical foot consisting of 2 syllables.
  - Iamb (a.k.a. iambus): short-long
  - Trochee (a.k.a. choreus or choree): long-short
  - Spondee: long-long
  - Pyrrhic (a.k.a. dibrach): short-short
- Trisyllable: metrical foot consisting of 3 syllables.
  - Dactyl: long-short-short
  - Anapaest (a.k.a. antidactylus): short-short-long. (Example: "The Destruction of Sennacherib" by Lord Byron.)
  - Amphibrach: short-long-short
  - Cretic (a.k.a. amphimacer): long-short-long. (Example: modern-day uses can typically be found in expressions like "In a while, crocodile;" as well as in slogans and advertising.)
  - Molossus: long-long-long
  - Tribrach: short-short-short
  - Bacchius: short-long-long
  - Antibacchius: long-long-short
- Tetrasyllable: metrical foot consisting of 4 syllables.
  - Tetrabrach (a.k.a. proceleusmatic): short-short-short-short
  - Dispondee: long-long-long-long
  - Paeon: a metrical foot of 1 long syllable and 3 short syllables in any order.
    - Primus paeon: long-short-short-short
    - Secundus paeon: short-long-short-short
    - Tertius paeon: short-short-long-short
    - Quartus paeon: short-short-short-long
  - Epitrite: a metrical foot consisting of 3 long syllables and 1 short syllable.
    - First epitrite: short-long-long-long
    - Second epitrite: long-short-long-long
    - Third epitrite: long-long-short-long
    - Fourth epitrite: long-long-long-short
  - Ionic: a metrical foot consisting of 2 short and 2 long syllables
    - Minor ionic (a.k.a. double iamb): short-short-long-long
    - Major ionic: long-long-short-short
    - Diamb: short-long-short-long (i.e., two iambs)
    - Ditrochee: long-short-long-short (i.e., two trochees)
    - Antispast: short-long-long-short
    - Choriamb: long-short-short-long (i.e., a trochee/choree alternating with an iamb)

== Metrical lines ==
- Hexasyllable: metrical line consisting of 6 syllables.
  - Double dactyl
- Octosyllable: metrical line consisting of 8 syllables.
- Decasyllable: metrical line consisting of 10 syllables.
- Hendecasyllable: metrical line consisting of 11 syllables.
- Dodecasyllable: metrical line consisting of 12 syllables.

== Forms ==
=== Verse meters ===
In a poetic composition, a verse is formally a single metrical line.

- Monometer: a line of verse with just 1 metrical foot.
- Dimeter: a line of verse with 2 metrical feet.
- Trimeter: a line of verse with 3 metrical feet.
- Tetrameter: a line of verse with 4 metrical feet.
- Hexameter: a line of verse with 6 metrical feet.
- Heptameter: a line of verse with 7 metrical feet.
- Octameter: a line of verse with 8 metrical feet.
- Dactylic meter: any meter based on the dactyl as its primary rhythmic unit.
  - Dactylic tetrameter
  - Dactylic pentameter
  - Dactylic hexameter
    - Golden line
- Iambic meter: any meter based on the iamb as its primary rhythmic unit.
  - Alexandrine (iambic hexameter): a 12-syllable iambic line adapted from French heroic verse. Example: the last line of each stanza in “The Convergence of the Twain” by Thomas Hardy.
    - Czech alexandrine
    - French alexandrine
    - Polish alexandrine
  - Fourteener (iambic heptameter): line consisting of 7 iambic feet (14 syllables)
  - Galliambic verse
  - Iambic pentameter: line consisting of 5 iambic feet (10 syllables)
  - Iambic tetrameter: line consisting of 4 iambic feet (8 syllables)
- Trochaic meter: any meter based on the trochee as its primary rhythmic unit.
  - Trochaic tetrameter
  - Trochaic octameter
  - Trochaic septenarius
- Arabic poetic meters:
  - Basīṭ
  - Hazaj
  - Kāmil
  - Mutaqārib
  - Madīd
  - Rajaz
  - Tawīl
  - Wāfir
- Anapestic tetrameter (a.k.a. reverse dactyl): a poetic meter that has 4 anapestic metres per line.
- Common metre: a quatrain with rhyme scheme ABAB and alternates 4-stress and 3-stress iambic lines. This is the meter used in hymns and ballads.
- Indian poetic meters:
  - Chhand
  - Kannada meter
  - Mandakranta
  - Mātrika
  - Ovi
  - Triveni
  - Sanskrit meter
  - Tamil meter
  - Vedic meter
    - Triṣṭubh: a Vedic meter of 44 syllables, or any hymn composed in this meter
- Long metre (a.k.a. long measure): a poetic metre consisting of quatrains (4-line stanzas) in iambic tetrameter with the rhyme scheme ABAB.
- Persian metres
- Quantitative meter: the dominant metrical system in which the rhythm depends on the length of time it takes to utter a line rather than on the number of stresses.
- Traditional Welsh

=== Types of verse ===
- Accentual verse
  - Accentual-syllabic verse
  - Syllabic verse
- Adonic
- Aeolic
  - Glyconic: most basic form of aeolic verse.
- Alcmanian
- Archilochian
- Asclepiad
- Choliamb
- Dochmiac
- Doggerel: a bad verse, traditionally characterized by clichés, clumsiness, and irregular meter.
- Free verse and vers libre: an open form of poetry that does not use consistent of meter patterns, rhyme, or any musical pattern, therefore tending to follow the rhythm of natural speech.
- Knittelvers
- Heroic verse
  - Riding rhyme: an early form of heroic verse derived from the rhythm of the poetry in parts of The Canterbury Tales depicting the pilgrims as they rode along.
- Leonine verse
- McWhirtle
- Neo-Miltonic syllabics
- Political verse (a.k.a. decapentasyllabic verse): iambic verse of 15 syllables.
- Saturnian
- Anuṣṭubh: a quatrain with each line (called a pāda, or 'foot') having 8 syllables.
  - Shloka
- Triadic-line

==== Verse forms ====
- Blank verse: non-rhyming iambic pentameter (10-syllable line). It is the predominant rhythm of traditional English dramatic and epic poetry, as it is considered the closest to English speech patterns. Examples: "Paradise Lost" by John Milton and “Sunday Morning” by Wallace Stevens.
- Chant royal: five stanzas of ababccddedE followed by either ddedE or ccddedE (capital letters indicating lines repeated verbatim).
- 'a Gra' Reformata': ten stanzas of ABA CD ABA CD ABA CD ABA CD ABA CD ABAC. Following the rhyme scheme of the Villanelle, but with 5 extra couplets just after each tercet.
- Cinquain: rhyme scheme ABABB.
- Clerihew: rhyme scheme AABB.
- Enclosed rhyme (a.k.a. enclosing rhyme): ABBA.
- Ghazal: AA BA CA DA
- Kural: Tamil verse form
- Limerick: AABBA.
- Monorhyme: an identical rhyme on every line, common in Latin and Arabic: AAAAA.
- Rondelet: AbAabbA (capital letters indicating lines repeated verbatim).
- Rubaiyat: AABA.
- Sapphics
- Seguidilla: Spanish-origin poem with seven syllable-counted lines, rhyming the second & fourth, and the fifth & seventh lines (ABCBDED).
  - Petrarchan sonnet: ABBA ABBA CDE CDE or ABBA ABBA CDC CDC.
- Sestina: a complex French verse form, usually unrhymed, consisting of 6 stanzas of 6 lines each and a 3-line envoi.
- Shadorma: an allegedly Spanish six-line stanza, syllable-count restricted form, 3/5/3/3/7/5
  - Shakespearean sonnet: ABAB CDCD EFEF GG.
  - Simple 4-line: ABCB.
  - Spenserian sonnet: ABAB BCBC CDCD EE.
  - Onegin stanzas: "aBaBccDDeFFeGG" with lowercase letters representing assonant rhymes and the uppercase representing end-rhymes.
- Sprung rhythm: a poetic rhythm designed to imitate the rhythm of natural speech.
- Tanaga: traditional Tagalog tanaga is AAAA.
- Terza rima: ABA BCB CDC, ending on YZY Z or YZY ZZ.

=== Types of rhyming ===
A rhyme is the repetition of syllables, typically found at the end of a verse line.

- Assonance (a.k.a. vowel rhyme): the repetition of vowel sounds without repeating consonants.
- Broken rhyme: a type of enjambment producing a rhyme by dividing a word at the line break of a poem to make a rhyme with the end word of another line
- Chiasmus: repetition of any group of verse elements (including rhyme and grammatical structure) in reverse order.
- Consonance: the repetition of identical or similar consonants in neighboring words whose vowel sounds are different
  - Alliteration: the repetition of initial stressed, consonant sounds in a series of words within a phrase or verse line.
- Cross rhyme
- Holorime: identical pronunciation of different lines; in other words, when two entire lines have the same sound
- Imperfect rhyme (a.k.a. half or near rhyme)
- Monorhyme
- Pararhyme
- Perfect rhyme (a.k.a. full or exact rhyme)
- Syllabic

=== Types of stanza ===
A stanza is a group of lines forming the basic recurring metrical unit in a poem. (cf. verse in music.)

- Alcaic: a 4-line stanza invented by the Classical Greek poet Alcaeus that uses a specific syllabic count per line and a predominantly dactylic meter.
- Ballad
- Biolet
- Burns
- Chaubola
- Cinquain
- Couplet: two successive rhyming lines (AA), usually of the same length (usually re-occurring as AA BB CC DD).
  - Doha
  - Heroic couplet: written in iambic pentameter.
  - Poulter's measure: couplets in which a 12-syllable iambic line rhymes with a 14-syllable iambic line.
- Envoi (or envoy): the brief stanza that ends French poetic forms such as the ballade or sestina.
- Ghazal
- Octave: an 8-line stanza or poem.
- Ottava rima: an Italian stanza of eight 11-syllable lines, with a rhyme scheme of ABABABCC.
- Quatorzain
- Quatrain: a 4-line poem or stanza
- Quintain
- Rhyme royal: a stanza of seven 10-syllable lines, with rhyme scheme ABABBCC.
- Sapphic
- Sestain
- Sestet: a 6-line stanza
  - Onegin stanza
- Spenserian: consists of 9 lines in total—8 iambic-pentameter lines and a final alexandrine—with a rhyme scheme of ABABBCBCC.
- Tercet (or triplet): a unit of three lines, rhymed (AAA) or unrhymed, often repeating like the couplet.
- Triolet: an 8-line stanza with only two rhymes, repeating the 1st line as the 4th and 7th lines, and the 2nd line as the 8th (ABaAabAB, capital letters indicating lines repeated verbatim).
- Terza rima: an Italian stanzaic form consisting of tercets with interwoven rhymes (ABA BCB DED EFE).

== Genres ==
=== Genres by structure ===
- Fixed form (French: forme fixe): the three 14th- and 15th-century French poetic forms:
  - Ballade: three 8-line stanzas (ababbcbC) and a 4-line envoi (bcbC). The last line of the first stanza is repeated verbatim (indicated by a capital letter) at the end of subsequent stanzas and the envoi. Example: Algernon Charles Swinburne’s translation “Ballade des Pendus” by François Villon.
  - Rondeau: a mainly octosyllabic poem consisting of between 10 and 15 lines and 3 stanzas. It has only 2 rhymes, with the opening words used twice as an un-rhyming refrain at the end of the 2nd and 3rd stanzas.
  - Virelai
- Found poem: a prose text or texts reshaped by a poet into quasi-metrical lines.
- Haiku: a type of short poem, originally from Japan, consisting of three lines in a 5, 7, 5 syllable pattern.
  - English-language haiku: an unrhymed tercet poem in the haiku style.
- Lekythion: a sequence of seven alternating long and short syllables at the end of a verse.
- Landay: a form of Afghani folk poetry that is composed as a couplet of 22 syllables.
- Mukhammas
- Pantoum: a Malaysian verse form adapted by French poets comprising a series of quatrains, with the 2nd and 4th lines of each quatrain repeated as the 1st and 3rd lines of the next. The 2nd and 4th lines of the final stanza repeat the 1st and 3rd lines of the first stanza.
- Pastiche
- Prose: a prose composition that is not broken into verse lines, instead expressing other traits such as symbols, metaphors, and figures of speech.
- Rondel (or roundel): a poem of 11 to 14 lines consisting of 2 rhymes and the repetition of the first 2 lines in the middle of the poem and at its end.
- Sonnet: a poem of 14 lines using any of a number of formal rhyme schemes; in English, they typically have 10 syllables per line.
  - Caudate sonnet
  - Crown of sonnets (a.k.a. sonnet redoublé)
  - Curtal sonnet
  - Petrarchan (or Italian): traditionally follows the rhyme scheme ABBA ABBA CDECDE; a common variation of the end is CDCDCD, especially within the final 6 lines
  - Shakespearean (or English): follows the rhyme scheme ABAB CDCD EFEF GG introducing a third quatrain (grouping of four lines), a final couplet, and a greater amount of variety with regard to rhyme than is usually found in its Italian predecessors. By convention, sonnets in English typically use iambic pentameter, while in the Romance languages, the hendecasyllable and Alexandrine are the most widely used meters.
  - Sonnet sequence
  - Spenserian sonnet
- Sijo
- Stichic: a poem composed of lines of the same approximate meter and length, not broken into stanzas.
- Syllabic: a poem whose meter is determined by the total number of syllables per line, rather than the number of stresses.
- Tanka: a Japanese form of five lines with 5, 7, 5, 7, and 7 syllables—31 in all.
- Villanelle: a French verse form consisting of five 3-line stanzas and a final quatrain, with the first and third lines of the first stanza repeating alternately in the following stanzas.

=== Genre by form/presentation ===
- Abecedarian: a poem in which the first letter of each line or stanza follows sequentially through the alphabet.
- Acrostic: a poem in which the first letter of each line spells out a word, name, or phrase when read vertically. Example: “A Boat beneath a Sunny Sky” by Lewis Carroll.
- Concrete (a.k.a. pattern): a written poem or verse whose lines are arranged as a shape/visual image, usually of the topic.
- Slam
- Sound
- Spoken-word
- Verbless poetry: a poem without verbs

=== Thematic genres ===
- Ars Poetica: a poem that explains the 'art of poetry', or a meditation on poetry using the form and techniques of a poem.
- Aubade: a love poem welcoming or lamenting the arrival of the dawn. Example: “The Sun Rising” by John Donne.
- Deep image
- Didactic
- Dramatic monologue
- Epithalamium (a.k.a. epithalamion): a nuptial poem in honour of the bride and bridegroom.
- Ecopoetry
- Ekphrasis: a poem that vividly describes a scene or work of art.
- Elliptical
- Epigram
- Folk
  - Folk ballad
- Gnomic: a poems laced with proverbs, aphorisms, or maxims.
- Hymn: a poem praising God or the divine (often sung).
- Lament: any poem expressing deep grief, usually at a death or some other loss.
  - Dirge
  - Elegy: a poem of lament, praise, and consolation, usually formal and sustained, over the death of a particular person. Example: "Elegy Written in a Country Churchyard" by Thomas Gray.
- Light: whimsical poems
  - Limerick
  - Nonsense
  - Double dactyl
- Lyric
  - Canzone: a lyric poem originating in medieval Italy and France and usually consisting of hendecasyllabic lines with end-rhyme.
  - Epithalamium
  - Madrigal: a song or short lyric poem intended for multiple singers.
  - Ode: a formal lyric poem that addresses, and typically celebrates, a person, place, thing, or idea.
    - Horatian Ode
    - Palinode: an ode that retracts or recants what the poet wrote in a previous poem.
    - Pindaric Ode
    - Sapphic ode
  - Stev: a form of Norwegian folk song consisting of quatrain lyric stanzas.
- Meditative
- Narrative
  - Ballad: a popular narrative song passed down orally. In English, it typically follows a form of rhymed ("abcb") quatrains alternating 4-stress and 3-stress lines.
    - Folk ballad: unknown origin, recounting tragic, comic, or heroic stories with emphasis on a central dramatic event. Examples: "Barbara Allen" and "John Henry"
    - Literary ballad: poems adapting the conventions of folk ballads, beginning in the Renaissance. Examples: “La Belle Dame sans Merci” by John Keats and “Annabel Lee” by Edgar Allan Poe.
  - Epic (or epos): an extended narrative poem, typically expressing heroic themes.
    - Mock-epic: a poem that plays with the conventions of the epic to comment on a topic satirically.
  - Epyllion: a brief narrative work written in dactylic hexameter, commonly dealing with mythological themes and characterized by vivid description and allusion.
  - Romance
- Occasional: a poem written to describe or comment on a particular event.
- Panegyric: a poem of great praise.
- Pastoral
  - Eclogue: a pastoral poem usually containing dialogue between shepherds.
  - Georgic
- Recusatio: a poem (or part thereof) in which the poet claim that they are supposedly unable or disinclined to write the type of poem that they originally intended to, and instead writes in a different style.

=== Movements ===
- Avant-garde
  - Flarf
  - Futurist
  - Language
- Beat: A movement that arose from San Francisco’s literary counterculture in the 1950s. Its poetry is primarily free verse, often surrealistic, and influenced by the cadences of jazz music.
- Black Mountain: A group of progressives in North Carolina associated with the experimental Black Mountain College in the 1940s and 1950s. Its poetic composition promoted a nontraditional style, following a improvisational, open-form approach, driven by the natural patterns of breath and the spoken word.
- Confessional
- Dada
- Dark Room Collective
- Fireside
- Fugitives
- Georgian
- Harlem Renaissance
- Imagism
- Metaphysical
- Négritude
- New American
- New Critic
- New Formalist
- New Historicist
- New York School
- Objectivist
- Oulipo
- Pre-Raphaelite
- Romantic
- Symbolist

== Other poetic devices ==
- Allusion: a brief, intentional reference to a historical, mythic, or literary person, place, event, or movement; in other words, a figure of speech using indirect reference."
- Anacrusis: brief introduction.
- Anaphora: the repetition of a word or words at the beginning of successive phrases, clauses, or lines to give emphasis.
- Apostrophe: an address to a dead or absent person, or personification as if that person were present. Example: "O Captain! My Captain!" by Walt Whitman.
- Blason: describes the physical attributes of a subject, usually female.
- Circumlocution: a roundabout wording. Example: In "Kubla Khan" by Samuel Taylor Coleridge—“twice five miles of fertile ground” (i.e., 10 miles).
- Epistrophe (a.k.a. epiphora): the repetition of a word or expression at the end of successive phrases or verses.
- Epizeuxis: the immediate repetition of a word or phrase for emphasis.
- Metaphor: a rhetorical figure of speech marked by implicit comparison, rather than direct or explicit comparison like in a simile. In a metaphor, the tenor is the subject to which attributes are ascribed (i.e., the target); the vehicle is the subject from which the attributes are derived/borrowed (i.e., the source); and ground is the shared properties between the two.
  - Conceit: a typically unconventional, logically complex, or surprising metaphor whose appeal is more intellectual than emotional.
  - Extended metaphor (a.k.a. sustained metaphor): the exploitation of a single metaphor or analogy at length through multiple linked tenors and vehicles throughout a poem.
    - Allegory: an extended metaphor in which the characters, places, and objects in a narrative carry figurative meaning. Often, the meaning of an allegory is religious, moral, or historical in nature. Example: "The Faerie Queene" by Edmund Spenser.
- Periphrasis: the usage of multiple separate words to carry the meaning of prefixes, suffixes or verbs.
- Objective correlative
- Simile: a figure of speech that directly/explicitly compares two things.
  - Homeric simile (a.k.a. epic simile)
- Syzygy: the combination of 2 metrical feet into a single unit, similar to an elision.

== Theory ==
- Descriptive poetics
- Historical poetics
- Negative capability
- Pathetic fallacy
- Poetic diction
- Poetic license
- Porson's Law
- Resolution: the phenomenon of replacing a long syllable with 2 short syllables.
- Robert Bridges's theory of elision
- Scansion
- Sievers's theory of Anglo-Saxon meter
- Theopoetics
- Weak position

== See also ==
- Poetry
  - Poet
  - List of basic poetry topics
- Literature
  - List of literary terms
