= Outline of poetry =

Form of literature, in verse

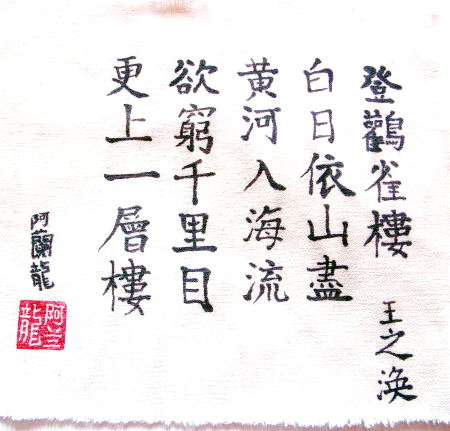
"Climbing Stork Tower" by Wang Zhihuan is one of the most famous poems in China.

The following outline is provided as an overview of and introduction to poetry:

Poetry (from the Greek word poiesis, "making") is a form of literary art that uses aesthetic and often rhythmic qualities of language to evoke meanings in addition to, or in place of, literal or surface-level meanings. Any particular instance of poetry is called a poem and is written by a poet. Poets use a variety of techniques called poetic devices, such as assonance, alliteration, consonance, euphony and cacophony, onomatopoeia, rhythm (via metre), rhyme schemes (patterns in the type and placement of a phoneme group) and sound symbolism, to produce musical or other artistic effects. They also frequently organize these devices intos, which may be strict or loose, conventional or invented by the poet. Poetic structures vary dramatically by language and cultural convention, but they often rely on rhythmic metre: patterns of syllable stress or syllable (or mora) weight. They may also use repeating patterns of phonemes, phoneme groups, tones, words, or entire phrases. Poetic structures may even be semantic (e.g. the volta required in a Petrachan sonnet).

== What type of thing is poetry? ==
Poetry can be described as all of the following things:

- One of the arts – as an art form, poetry is an outlet of human expression, that is usually influenced by culture and which in turn helps to change culture. Poetry is a physical manifestation of the internal human creative impulse.
  - A form of literature – literature is composition, that is, written or oral work such as books, stories, and poems.
  - Fine art – in Western European academic traditions, fine art is art developed primarily for aesthetics, distinguishing it from applied art that also has to serve some practical function. The word "fine" here does not so much denote the quality of the artwork in question, but the purity of the discipline according to traditional Western European canons.

== Types of poetry ==
=== Common poetic forms ===
- Epic – lengthy narrative poem, ordinarily concerning a serious subject containing details of heroic deeds and events significant to a culture or nation. Milman Parry and Albert Lord have argued that the Homeric epics, the earliest works of Western literature, were fundamentally an oral poetic form. These works form the basis of the epic genre in Western literature.
- Sonnet – poetic form which originated in Italy; Giacomo da Lentini is credited with its invention.
- Jintishi – literally "Modern Poetry", was actually composed from the 5th century onwards and is considered to have been fully developed by the early Tang dynasty. The works were principally written in five- and seven-character lines and involve constrained tone patterns, intended to balance the four tones of Middle Chinese within each couplet.
- Villanelle – nineteen-line poetic form consisting of five tercets followed by a quatrain. There are two refrains and two repeating rhymes, with the first and third line of the first tercet repeated alternately until the last stanza, which includes both repeated lines. The villanelle is an example of a fixed versed form.
- Tanka – a classical Japanese poem, composed in Japanese (rather than Chinese, as with kanshi)
- Ode – a poem written in praise of a person (e.g. Psyche), thing (e.g. a Grecian urn), or event
- Ghazal – an Arabic poetic form with rhyming couplets and a refrain, each line in the same meter
- Haiku – a poem, normally in Japanese but also in other languages (particularly English), normally with 17 syllables arranged as 5 + 7 + 5
- Free verse - an open form of poetry which does not use consistent meter patterns or rhyme, tending to follow the rhythm of natural speech

=== Periods, styles and movements ===
- Augustan poetry – poetry written during the reign of Caesar Augustus as Emperor of Rome, particularly Virgil, Horace, and Ovid.
- Automatic poetry – Surrealist poetry written using the automatic method.
- Black Mountain – postmodern American poetry written in the mid-20th century, in Black Mountain College in North Carolina.
- Chanson de geste
- Classical Chinese poetry
- Concrete poetry
- Cowboy poetry
- Digital poetry
- Epitaph
- Fable
- Found poetry
- Haptic poetry
- Imagism
- Libel
- Limerick poetry
- Lyric poetry
- Metaphysical poetry
- Medieval poetry
- Microstory
- Minnesinger
- Modern Chinese poetry
- Modernist poetry
- The Movement
- Narrative poetry
- Objectivist
- Occasional poetry
- Odes and elegies
- Parable
- Parnassian
- Pastoral
- Performance poetry
- Post-modernist
- Prose poetry
- Romanticism
- San Francisco Renaissance
- Sound poetry
- Symbolism
- Troubadour
- Trouvère
- Visual poetry

== History of poetry ==
History of poetry – the earliest poetry is believed to have been recited or sung, such as in the form of hymns (such as the work of Sumerian priestess Enheduanna), and employed as a way of remembering oral history, genealogy, and law. Many of the poems surviving from the ancient world are recorded prayers, or stories about religious subject matter, but they also include historical accounts, instructions for everyday activities, love songs, and fiction.

- List of years in poetry

== Elements of poetry ==
- Accents
- Caesura
- Couplets – a pair of lines of meter in poetry. It usually consists of two lines that rhyme and have the same meter. While traditionally couplets rhyme, not all do.
- Elision
- Foot
- Intonation
- Meter
- Mora
- Prosody
- Rhythm
- Scansion
- Stanza
- Syllable

=== Scanning meter ===
- spondee – two stressed syllables together
- iamb – unstressed syllable followed by a stressed syllable
- trochee – one stressed syllable followed by an unstressed syllable
- dactyl – one stressed syllable followed by two unstressed syllables
- anapest – two unstressed syllables followed by one stressed syllable

The number of metrical feet in a line are described in Greek terminology as follows:

- dimeter – two feet
- trimeter – three feet
- tetrameter – four feet
- pentameter – five feet
- hexameter – six feet
- heptameter – seven feet
- octameter – eight feet

=== Common metrical patterns ===
- Iambic pentameter
  - Example: Paradise Lost, by John Milton
- Dactylic hexameter
  - Examples:
    - Iliad, by Homer
    - The Metamorphoses, by Ovid
- Iambic tetrameter
  - Examples:
    - To His Coy Mistress, by Andrew Marvell
    - Eugene Onegin, by Aleksandr Pushkin
- Trochaic octameter
  - Example: The Raven, by Edgar Allan Poe
- Anapestic tetrameter
  - Examples:
    - The Hunting of the Snark, by Lewis Carroll
    - Don Juan, by Lord Byron
- Alexandrine – also known as iambic hexameter.
  - Example: Phèdre, by Jean Racine

=== Rhyme, alliteration and assonance ===
- Alliteration
- Alliterative verse
- Assonance
- Consonance
- Internal rhyme
- Rhyme

==== Rhyming schemes ====
- Chant royal
- Ottava rima
- Rubaiyat

=== Stanzas and verse paragraphs ===
- 2-line stanza: couplet or distich
- 3-line stanza: triplet or tercet
- 4-line stanza: quatrain
- 5-line stanza: quintain or cinquain)
- 6-line stanza: sestet
- 8-line stanza: octet
- verse paragraph

== Some famous poets and their poems ==
- Anna Akhmatova
  - Requiem
- Maya Angelou
  - On the Pulse of Morning
- Ludovico Ariosto
  - Orlando Furioso
- W. H. Auden
  - Musée des Beaux Arts
  - September 1, 1939
- Matsuo Bashō
  - Natsu no Tsuki (Summer Moon)
- Charles Baudelaire
  - Les Fleurs du Mal
- William Blake
  - The Chimney Sweeper
  - The Sick Rose
  - London
- Geoffrey Chaucer
  - The Complaint of Mars
- Samuel Coleridge
  - The Rime of the Ancient Mariner
- Dante
  - Divine Comedy
- Kamala Das
  - The Descendants
- Emily Dickinson
  - "Hope" is the thing with feathers
  - "Why do I love" You, Sir
  - "Faith" is a fine invention
- John Donne
  - Devotions upon Emergent Occasions
  - Elegy XIX: To His Mistress Going to Bed
- Rita Dove
  - Thomas and Beulah (collection)
- John Dryden
  - Absalom and Achitophel
  - Mac Flecknoe
- T. S. Eliot
  - The Waste Land
- Ferdowsi
  - Shahnameh
- Robert Frost
  - The Road Not Taken
  - Nothing Gold Can Stay
- Mirza Ghalib
- Goethe
- Homer
  - Iliad
  - Odyssey
- Gerard Manley Hopkins
  - Binsey Poplars
- Horace
  - Epistles (collection)
- Victor Hugo
  - Les Contemplations
- Alfred Edward Housman
  - To An Athlete Dying Young
- Omar Khayyám
  - Rubaiyat of Omar Khayyam (Translated Collection)
- John Keats
  - Sleep and Poetry
- Jan Kochanowski
  - Laments (Translated Collection)
- Ignacy Krasicki
  - Fables and Parables
- Jean de La Fontaine
- Mikhail Lermontov
  - Boyarin Orsha
- Li Bai
  - Quiet Night Thought
- Stéphane Mallarmé
  - L'après-midi d'un faune
- W.S. Merwin
- Czesław Miłosz
- John Milton
  - Paradise Lost
- Pablo Neruda
  - Twenty Love Poems and a Song of Despair (Collection)
- Ovid
  - Ars Amatoria (Collection)
- Petrarch
  - Il Canzoniere (Collection)
- Sylvia Plath
  - Lady Lazarus
- Edgar Allan Poe
  - The Raven
- Alexander Pope
  - The Rape of the Lock
- Ezra Pound
  - The Cantos
- Alexander Pushkin
  - Ruslan and Ludmila
- Rainer Maria Rilke
  - Duino Elegies
- Arthur Rimbaud
  - Le Bateau ivre (The Drunken Boat)
- Jalal ad-Din Rumi
  - Masnavi
- William Shakespeare
  - Shakespeare's sonnets
- Shel Silverstein
  - Where the Sidewalk Ends (Collection)
- Edmund Spenser
  - The Faerie Queene
- Philip Sidney
  - The Countess of Pembroke's Arcadia
- Tasso
  - Jerusalem Delivered
- Alfred Tennyson, 1st Baron Tennyson
  - Break, Break, Break
  - The Charge of the Light Brigade
  - Tears, Idle Tears
- François Villon
- Virgil
  - Aeneid
- Derek Walcott
  - Omeros
- Walt Whitman
  - Song of Myself
  - Out of the Cradle Endlessly Rocking
- William Wordsworth
  - The Prelude
- William Butler Yeats
  - Sailing to Byzantium
  - Swift's Epitaph (Translation)

== See also ==
- Glossary of poetry terms
- Glossary of literary terms
