= Prosody =

Prosody may refer to:

- Prosody (poetry), the study and the actual use of metres and forms of versification
- Prosody (linguistics), the study of suprasegmental elements of speech
- Prosody (music), the manner of setting words to music
- Prosody (software), a cross-platform XMPP server

== See also ==
- Arabic prosody, study of poetic meters in Arabic
- Aruz, Persian, Turkic and Urdu prosody, using the ʿarūż meters
- English prosody, in the English language
- Greek prosody, the theory and practice of versification in Greek
- Kannada prosody, the study of metres used in Kannada poetry
- Latin prosody, the study of Latin poetry and its laws of meter
- Sanskrit prosody, the study of poetic meters and verse in Sanskrit
- Tamil prosody, defining several metres covering the various aspects of rhythm
- Emotional prosody, paralinguistic aspects of language use that convey emotion
- Semantic prosody, the way neutral words can be perceived as positive or negative
