= O Death Rock Me Asleep =

Tudor-era poem (1536)

- by Anne Boleyn
- Original title: "O Death! rocke me asleep"
- Written: 1536
- Country: England
- Language: Early Modern English
- Subject(s): death
- Meter: tetrameter or trimeter

"O Death Rock Me Asleep" is a Tudor-era poem, traditionally attributed to Anne Boleyn. It was written shortly before her execution in 1536.

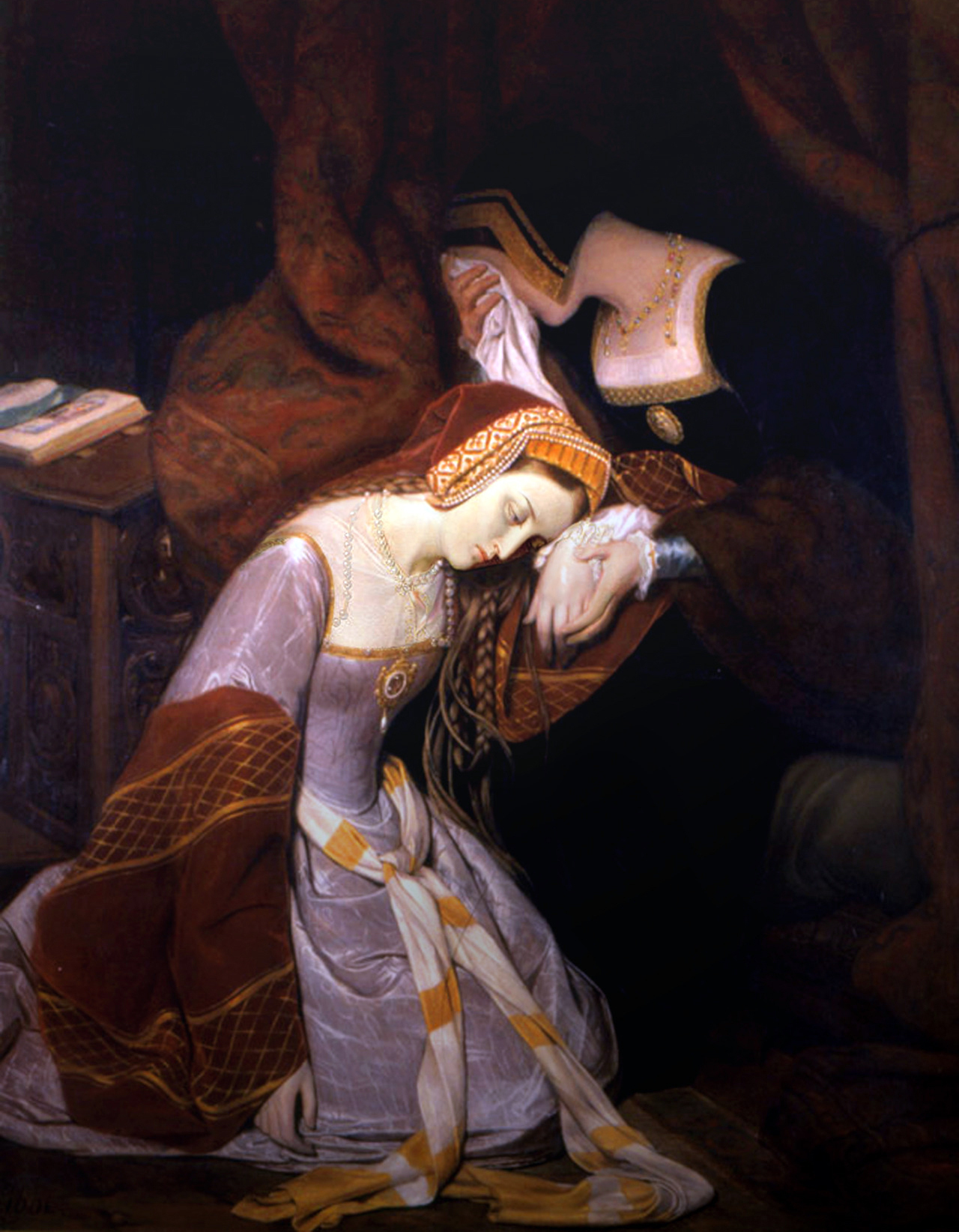
Anne Boleyn in the Tower of London (Édouard Cibot, 1835)

== Authorship ==
The poem is generally attributed to Anne Boleyn, and is assumed to have been composed whilst she was imprisoned in the Tower of London. However, the evidence for Anne's authorship is not entirely conclusive. It has been postulated that the poem was actually written by Anne's brother Lord Rochford, who was also imprisoned in the Tower at the same time as Anne, and whose execution took place two days before her own.

== Analysis ==
The poem was written in the last days of Anne's life and is a reflection on her suffering. In it, she observes that her end cannot be avoided, and that it will at least give her peace and an escape from her present sufferings.

=== Structure ===
The poem has a fairly loose structure, with most lines either being tetrameter or trimeter. At the end of each major stanza, there is a refrain, varying slightly, about the nearing of death and how it is inevitable.

== Text ==
Original spelling

O Death! rocke me asleep;
Bringe me to quiet reste;
let pass my weary, guiltles ghost
out of my carefull brest.

Toll on, the passinge-bell;
ring out my dolefull knell;
let thy sounde my death tell.
Death dothe drawe ny;
there is no remedie.

My paynes, who can expres?
Alas! they are so stronge
my dolor will not suffer strength
my lyfe for to prolonge.

Toll on, the passinge-bell;
ring out my dolefull knell;
let thy sounde my death tell.
for I must dye;
there is no remedie.

Alone, in prison stronge,
I wayte my destenye.
Wo worth this cruel hap, that I
should taste this miserie!

Toll on, the passinge-bell;
ring out my dolefull knell;
let thy sounde my death tell.
Death dothe drawe ny;
there is no remedie.

Farewell! my pleasures past;
welcum! my present payne.
I fele my tormentes so increse
that lyfe cannot remayne.

Toll on, the passinge-bell;
rong is my dolefull knell;
for the sound my dethe doth tell.
Death dothe drawe ny;
there is no remedie.

Sound my end dolefully
for now I dye.

Modernised spelling

O death! rock me asleep,
Bring me the quiet rest;
Let pass my weary guiltless ghost
Out of my careful breast.

Toll on the passing bell,
Ring out the doleful knell,
Let thy sound my death tell,
Death doth draw nigh;
There is no remedy.

My pains who can express?
Alas! they are so strong,
My dolour will not suffer strength
My life for to prolong.

Toll on, thou passing bell,
Ring out my doleful knell,
Let thy sound my death tell,
For I must die;
There is no remedy.

Alone in prison strong,
I wait my destiny,
Woe worth this cruel hap that I
Should taste this misery?

Toll on, thou passing bell,
Ring out my doleful knell,
Let thy sound my death tell,
Death doth draw nigh,
There is no remedy.

Farewell my pleasures past,
Welcome my present pain!
I feel my torments so increase
That life cannot remain.

Cease now, thou passing bell;
Rung is my doleful knell,
For the sound my death doth tell,
Death doth draw nigh,
There is no remedy.

Sound my end dolefully
For now I die.
