= Greek prosody =

Theory and practice of versification

Prosody (from Middle French prosodie, from Latin prosōdia, from Ancient Greek προσῳδίᾱ (prosōidíā), 'song sung to music', 'pronunciation of syllable') is the theory and practice of versification.

== Prosody ==
Greek poetry is based on syllable length, not on syllable stress, as in English. The two syllable lengths in Greek poetry are long and short. It is probable that in the natural spoken language there were also syllables of intermediate length, as in the first syllable of words such as τέκνα /tékna/ 'children', where a short vowel is followed by a plosive + liquid combination; but for poetic purposes such syllables were treated as either long or short. Thus in the opening speech of the play Oedipus Tyrannus, Sophocles treats the first syllable of τέκνα /tékna/ as long in line 1, but as short in line 6.

Different kinds of poetry use different patterns of long and short syllables, known as meters (Commonwealth: metres). For example, the epic poems of Homer were composed using the pattern | – u u | – u u | – u u | – u u | – u u | – – | (the so-called dactylic hexameter, where – represents a long syllable, and u a short one.)

It would appear that most Ancient Greek poetry, including the poems of Homer, was composed to be sung to music, and it is generally assumed by those who have reconstructed the surviving fragments of Greek music, such as the Seikilos epitaph, that a short syllable was sung to a short note, while the long syllables were sung to longer notes, or to a group of two or three short notes.

The word-accents in Greek poetry did not affect the meter, but contributed to the melody, in that (judging from the Seikilos inscription and other fragments) syllables with an acute accent tended to be sung on a higher pitch, and those with a circumflex were sung on two notes, the first higher than the second. (See Ancient Greek accent for musical examples.)

=== Determining Quantity ===
There are rules that determine the length of any given syllable. A syllable is said to be "long by nature" if it contains a long vowel or a diphthong:

- η and ω are always long.
- α, ι, and υ can be either long or short.
- αι, αυ, ει, ευ, οι, ου, ηυ, υι, ᾳ, ῃ and ῳ are either diphthongs or in some cases represent long vowels written as a digraph.

A syllable is "long by position" if the vowel precedes the consonants ζ /zd/, ξ /ks/ or ψ /ps/ or two other consonants. However, a plosive followed by a liquid or a nasal will not necessarily lengthen a syllable.

- π, β, φ, τ, δ, θ, κ, γ and χ are plosives.
- λ and ρ are liquids.
- μ and ν are nasals.

The final syllable of a line, even if short by nature, is, if the relevant hypothesis is accepted, generally considered long ("brevis in longo"), as in the opening line of Euripides' play The Bacchae:

- ἥκω Διὸς παῖς τήνδε Θηβαίων χθόνα
  hḗkō Diòs paîs tḗnde Thēbaíōn khthóna
  | – – u – | – – u – | – – u – |
  "I, the son of Zeus, have come to this land of the Thebans"

An exception to the brevis in longo rule is occasionally found in lyric poetry when lines sometimes form a continuous system without a pause between one line and the next, for example Aristophanes, Birds 333.

When a single consonant comes between two vowels, such as in the word χθόνα (khthóna), the consonant is deemed to start the second syllable: χθό-να. A syllable ending in a vowel, like χθό-, is called an "open syllable". Note that ζ /zd/, ξ /ks/ and ψ /ps/ count as two consonants, and a word like ἄξιος (áxios) is divided into syllables as ak-si-os, with the first syllable closed. A short syllable is a syllable which is open and which has a short vowel, such as khtho- or di-.

If a word ends in a short vowel + consonant, such as ἄξιος (áxios), the final syllable will be treated as long by position if the next word starts with a consonant; but if the next word starts with a vowel, the consonant will be taken as part of the next syllable and the final syllable of the word will be considered short, for example ἄξιός ἐστι (áxiós esti), syllabified as ak-si-o-ses-ti.

=== Exceptions ===
- γμ, γν, δμ and δν will always make a long syllable even when preceded by a short vowel, e.g. Κάδμος (kádmos) 'Cadmus'.
- In epic and elegiac poetry, a long vowel or diphthong at the end of a word preceding a vowel is usually shortened, e.g. ἄνδρα μοι ἔννεπε (ándra moi énnepe) 'tell me of the man', which is scanned | – u u | – u u |. This is called "Epic Correption." Correption is also sometimes found within a word, e.g. ὑιός u –, τουτουί – u –.

== Metrical feet ==
The ancient prosodists divided lines of verse into 'feet', each foot consisting usually of 3 or 4 syllables (but sometimes 2 or 5). These can be seen as roughly equivalent to bars in a line of music. The different varieties of feet were given different names, as follows:

=== Disyllables ===
Macron and breve notation: – = long syllable; ᴗ = short syllable.

pattern	name
ᴗ ᴗ	pyrrhus, dibrach
ᴗ –	iamb /ˈaɪæm/ (or iambus)
– ᴗ	trochee/ /ˈtrəʊkiː/, choree (or choreus)
– –	spondee

=== Trisyllables ===
pattern	name
ᴗ ᴗ ᴗ	tribrach
– ᴗ ᴗ	dactyl
ᴗ – ᴗ	amphibrach
ᴗ ᴗ –	anapaest (anapest)
ᴗ – –	bacchius
– ᴗ –	cretic
– – ᴗ	antibacchius
– – –	molossus

=== Tetrasyllables ===
pattern	name
ᴗ ᴗ ᴗ ᴗ	proceleusmatic, tetrabrach
– ᴗ ᴗ ᴗ	first paeon
ᴗ – ᴗ ᴗ	second paeon
ᴗ ᴗ – ᴗ	third paeon
ᴗ ᴗ ᴗ –	fourth paeon
– – ᴗ ᴗ	major ionic
ᴗ ᴗ – –	minor ionic
– ᴗ – ᴗ	ditrochee
ᴗ – ᴗ –	diiamb
– ᴗ ᴗ –	choriamb
ᴗ – – ᴗ	antispast
ᴗ – – –	first epitrite /ˈɛpɪˌtraɪt/
– ᴗ – –	second epitrite
– – ᴗ –	third epitrite
– – – ᴗ	fourth epitrite
– – – –	dispondee

== Non-lyric meters ==
Non-lyric meters are those used for narrative, funeral elegies, the dialogue of tragedies, pastoral poetry, and didactic poetry. A characteristic of these metres is that every line is the same length throughout the poem (except for the elegiac couplet, in which the whole couplet is repeated throughout the poem).

=== Dactylic ===
==== Hexameter ====
The earliest Greek poetry, namely the poems ascribed to Homer and Hesiod, is written in dactylic hexameters, of which the basic scheme is as follows:

| – u u | – u u | – u u | – u u | – u u | – – |

In this meter any of the pairs of short syllables (u u) can be replaced by a long syllable (–), although this is rare in the fifth foot.

The opening lines of Homer's epic poem the Iliad are scanned as follows:

μῆνιν ἄειδε, θεὰ, Πηληϊάδεω Ἀχιλῆος
οὐλομένην, ἣ μυρί’ Ἀχαιοῖς ἄλγε’ ἔθηκε,
πολλὰς δ’ ἰφθίμους ψυχὰς Ἄϊδι προΐαψεν
ἡρώων, αὐτοὺς δὲ ἑλώρια τεῦχε κύνεσσιν
οἰωνοῖσί τε πᾶσι, Διὸς δ’ ἐτελείετο βουλή,
ἐξ οὗ δὴ τὰ πρῶτα διαστήτην ἐρίσαντε
Ἀτρεΐδης τε ἄναξ ἀνδρῶν καὶ δῖος Ἀχιλλεύς.

mênin áeide, theà, Pēlēïádeō Akhilêos
ouloménēn, hḕ murí’ Akhaioîs álge’ éthēke,
pollàs d’ iphthímous psukhàs Áïdi proḯapsen
hērṓōn, autoùs dè helṓria teûkhe kúnessin
oiōnoîsí te pâsi, Diòs d’ eteleíeto boulḗ,
ex hoû dḕ tà prôta diastḗtēn erísante
Atreḯdēs te ánax andrôn kaì dîos Akhilleús.

| – u u | – u u | – – | – u u | – u u | – – |
| – u u | – – | – u u | – – | – u u | – – |
| – – | – – | – – | – u u | – u u | – – |
| – – | – – | – u u | – u u | – u u | – – |
| – – | – u u | – u u | – u u | – u u | – – |
| – – | – – | – u u | – – | – u u | – – |
| – u u | – u u | – – | – – | – u u | – – |

"Sing, goddess, of the anger of Peleus' son Achilles,
that destructive anger, which made countless sorrows for the Achaeans,
and sent many mighty souls to Hades
of heroes, and made them prey for dogs
and birds of all kinds, and the plan of Zeus was fulfilled;
(sing) from when that first time the two differed, quarrelling –
Atreus' son, lord of men, and godlike Achilles."

In order to accommodate the words to the meter, Homer often varies them. Thus in the above extract, the final two vowels of Πηληϊάδεω are merged into one by synizesis, the first vowel of ὀλομένην "destructive" is lengthened to make οὐλομένην, the name "Achilles" is sometimes pronounced with a double and sometimes with a single "l" Ἀχιλλεύς, Ἀχιλῆος, and so on. He also uses the past tense of verbs sometimes with the augment ἐ-, e.g. ἔθηκε, and sometimes without it, e.g. τεῦχε.

The line is divided into six feet, known as dactyls (– u u) and spondees (– –). In this opening passage of the Iliad, dactyls and spondees are equally common, although overall in Greek hexameters, the dactylic foot is slightly more common (in the ratio 60-40), while in Latin hexameters the spondee is more common (in the same ratio). The fifth foot in Greek hexameters is nearly always a dactyl; in Homer only 1 line in 18 has a spondaic fifth foot. Because the final syllable in a line is long by position, the last foot is always a spondee.

Often there is a slight pause in the line, known as a caesura, in the middle of the third foot, as in lines 1, 5, and 6 above. However, for variety the position of the caesura can change, for example to the middle of the 2nd foot, as in lines 2 and 4, or the middle of the 4th foot, as in lines 3 and 7. There is never a word-break exactly in the middle of the line, although pastoral poetry (such as that of Theocritus) often makes a word-break between the 4th and 5th foot, known as a "bucolic caesura".

==== Elegiac couplet ====
The dactylic hexameter is also used for short epigrams, such as Simonides' epigram commemorating the Spartans who died in the battle of Thermopylae of 480 BC. In this case it is joined with a pentameter, consisting of two sections of two and a half feet each. The second half of a pentameter always has | – u u | – u u | – |, without variation.

ὦ ξεῖν’, ἀγγέλλειν Λακεδαιμονίοις ὅτι τῇδε

κείμεθα τοῖς κείνων ῥήμασι πειθόμενοι.

ô xeîn’, angéllein Lakedaimoníois hóti têide

keímetha toîs keínōn rhḗmasi peithómenoi.

| – – | – – | – u u | – u u | – u u | – – |

| – u u | – – | – || – u u | – u u | – |

"O stranger, take news to the Spartans that in this place

we lie, obedient to their words."

The dactylic hexameter-pentameter couplet was also used for elegies (hence the name "elegiac couplet") and later, in writers such as Callimachus in the Hellenistic period, for poems about love.

=== Iambic ===
==== Tragic trimeter ====
Another very common meter, which is used in the dialogues of Greek plays, is the iambic trimeter. The basic scheme for this is as follows (where "x" represents an anceps syllable, that is one which may be either long or short):

| x – u – | x – u – | x – u – |

The group | x – u – | is known as a "metron", consisting of two feet. In the first and second metron, one of the two long syllables may be replaced by two short ones, making the following possible variations:

| – uu u – |
| u uu u – |
| – – u uu |
| u – u uu |

Occasionally also, especially to accommodate a proper name, as in lines 2 and 3 of the example below, the anceps syllable may be replaced by two shorts:

| uu – u – |

Unlike most other kinds of Greek poetry, it appears that the iambic trimeter was used for dialogue unaccompanied by music.

The opening lines of Euripides' play the Bacchae are scanned as follows (the resolved elements are underlined):

ἥκω Διὸς παῖς τήνδε Θηβαίων χθόνα
Διόνυσος, ὃν τίκτει ποθ’ ἡ Κάδμου κόρη
Σεμέλη λοχευθεῖσ’ ἀστραπηφόρῳ πυρί·
μορφὴν δ’ ἀμείψας ἐκ θεοῦ βροτησίαν
πάρειμι Δίρκης νάματ’ Ἰσμηνοῦ θ’ ὕδωρ.
ὁρῶ δὲ μητρὸς μνῆμα τῆς κεραυνίας
τόδ’ ἐγγὺς οἴκων καὶ δόμων ἐρείπια
τυφόμενα δίου πυρὸς ἔτι ζῶσαν φλόγα,
ἀθάνατον Ἥρας μητέρ’ εἰς ἐμὴν ὕβριν.
αἰνῶ δὲ Κάδμον, ἄβατον ὃς πέδον τόδε
τίθησι, θυγατρὸς σηκόν· ἀμπέλου δέ νιν
πέριξ ἐγὼ ’κάλυψα βοτρυώδει χλόῃ.

| – – u – | – – u – | – – u – |
| uu – u – | – – u – | – – u – |
| uu – u – | – – u – | u – u – |
| – – u – | – – u – | u – u – |
| u – u – | – – u – | – – u – |
| u – u – | – – u – | u – u – |
| u – u – | – – u – | u – u – |
| – uu u – | – uu u – | – – u – |
| – uu u – | – – u – | u – u – |
| – – u – | u uu u – | u – u – |
| u – u uu | – – u – | u – u – |
| u – u – | u – u uu | – – u – |

"I, son of Zeus, have come to this land of the Thebans,
Dionysus, whom once that daughter of Cadmus bore,
Semele, brought to birth by lightning-born fire;
and having changed from a god to mortal shape
I am here by the streams of Dirce and Ismenus' water.
And I see the tomb of my mother who was struck by lightning,
here near the palace, and the ruins of her house
smoking with the still living flame of the divine fire,
the undying insult of Hera towards my mother.
And I praise Cadmus, who made this ground holy,
a sanctuary for his daughter; and I have covered it
all round with the grape-bearing greenness of the vine."

==== Comic trimeter ====
The iambic trimeter is also the basic meter used in the dialogue parts of Greek comedies, such as the plays of Aristophanes and Menander. In comedy there tend to be more resolutions into short syllables than in tragedy, and Porson's Law is not observed. Sometimes even a short element can be replaced by two short syllables, making for example:

| – – uu – |

However, the last foot of the line is always an iamb: | .... u – |.

As an example of the comic version of the iambic trimeter, here are the opening lines of Aristophanes' play Lysistrata. A short element is resolved in lines 2, 4, 6, and 7; Porson's Law is broken in lines 1, 7 and 8:

ἀλλ᾽ εἴ τις ἐς Βακχεῖον αὐτὰς ἐκάλεσεν,
ἢ 'ς Πανὸς ἢ 'πὶ Κωλιάδ᾽ ἢ 'ς Γενετυλλίδος,
οὐδ᾽ ἂν διελθεῖν ἦν ἂν ὑπὸ τῶν τυμπάνων.
νῦν δ᾽ οὐδεμία πάρεστιν ἐνταυθοῖ γυνή:
πλὴν ἥ γ᾽ ἐμὴ κωμῆτις ἥδ᾽ ἐξέρχεται.
χαῖρ᾽ ὦ Καλονίκη. - καὶ σύ γ᾽ ὦ Λυσιστράτη.
τί συντετάραξαι; μὴ σκυθρώπαζ᾽ ὦ τέκνον.
οὐ γὰρ πρέπει σοι τοξοποιεῖν τὰς ὀφρῦς.

| – – u – | – – u – | – uu u – |
| – – u – | u – uu – | uu – u – |
| – – u – | – – u uu | – – u – |
| – – uu – | u – u – | – – u – |
| – – u – | – – u – | – – u – |
| – – uu – | – – u – | – – u – |
| u – uu – | – – u – | – – u – |
| – – u – | – – u – | – – u – |

"But if someone had invited those women to a Bacchic rite
or to Pan's or to Colias or Genetyllis's,
you wouldn't be able to pass through the streets for tambourines!
As it is, not a single woman has turned up!
Except at least here's my neighbour coming out.
Hello, Calonice!" – "You too, Lysistrata!
Why are you so upset? Don't scowl, my dear.
It doesn't become you to make your eyebrows into a bow!"

==== Iambic tetrameter ====
Other meters are also used for the dialogues of comedies, especially when there is a change of pace or mood. One such meter is the iambic tetrameter. This metre is generally catalectic, that is, the last syllable is removed; since the final syllable of a line always counts as long, in catalexis the formerly short penultimate is changed to a long when it becomes final, as in this extract from Aristophanes play the Clouds (1399ff):

ὡς ἡδὺ καινοῖς πράγμασιν καὶ δεξιοῖς ὁμιλεῖν,
καὶ τῶν καθεστώτων νόμων ὑπερφρονεῖν δύνασθαι.
ἐγὼ γὰρ ὅτε μὲν ἱππικῇ τὸν νοῦν μόνῃ προσεῖχον,
οὐδ’ ἂν τρί’ εἰπεῖν ῥήμαθ’ οἷός τ’ ἦν πρὶν ἐξαμαρτεῖν·
νυνὶ δ’ ἐπειδή μ’ οὑτοσὶ τούτων ἔπαυσεν αὐτός,
γνώμαις δὲ λεπταῖς καὶ λόγοις ξύνειμι καὶ μερίμναις,
οἶμαι διδάξειν ὡς δίκαιον τὸν πατέρα κολάζειν.

| – – u – | – – u – || – – u – | u – – |
| – – u – | – – u – || u – u – | u – – |
| u – u uu | u – u – || – – u – | u – – |
| – – u – | – – u – | – – u – | u – – |
| – – u – | – – u – || – – u – | u – – |
| – – u – | – – u – || u – u – | u – – |
| – – u – | – – u – | – – u uu | u – – |

"How nice it is to converse about new and clever things,
and to be able to treat established customs with contempt!
For when I used to apply my mind only to horseracing
I wouldn't have been able to say three words before making a mistake;
but now since my dad here himself has stopped me from doing these things
and I understand subtle opinions and arguments and thoughts,
I think I shall teach how it is right to punish my father."

In Roman comedies this meter is known as the Iambic septenarius. There is often a break (dieresis) between the two halves of the line, but as the above example shows, this is not always found.

=== Trochaic ===
Occasionally, as an alternative to iambic, Greek playwrights use trochaic feet, as in the trochaic tetrameter catalectic. According to Aristotle (Poet. 1449a21) this was the original meter used in satyr plays. In the extant plays, it is more often used in comedy, although occasionally also in tragedy (e.g. Aeschylus' Agamemnon 1649-73). The basic double foot or metron is | – u – x |. Here is an example from Aristophanes' Clouds (607ff), where the leader of the chorus of Clouds addresses the audience:

ἡνίχ’ ἡμεῖς δεῦρ’ ἀφορμᾶσθαι παρεσκευάσμεθα,
ἡ σελήνη συντυχοῦσ’ ἡμῖν ἐπέστειλεν φράσαι,
πρῶτα μὲν χαίρειν Ἀθηναίοισι καὶ τοῖς ξυμμάχοις·
εἶτα θυμαίνειν ἔφασκε· δεινὰ γὰρ πεπονθέναι
ὠφελοῦσ’ ὑμᾶς ἅπαντας, οὐ λόγοις ἀλλ’ ἐμφανῶς.

| – u – – | – u – – | – u – – | – u – |
| – u – – | – u – – | – u – – | – u – |
| – u – – | – u – – | – u – – | – u – |
| – u – – | – u – u || – u – u | – u – |
| – u – – | – u – u || – u – – | – u – |

"When we were preparing to set out here,
the Moon met us and instructed us to say,
first to greet the Athenians and their allies,
then she said she was angry; for she has suffered grievously,
despite helping you all, not with words but in reality."

When used in tragedy, there is always a break (dieresis) in the middle of the line, but as can be seen above, this is not always the case in comedy.

This metre is also frequently used in Roman comedies, where it is known as the Trochaic septenarius.

Some authors analyse this catalectic form of the meter not as trochaic but as iambic, with initial not final catalexis.

In general, however, ancient writers seem to have recognised that trochaic meters had a different character from iambic. The name "trochaic" is derived from the Greek verb τρέχω "I run" and it was considered a livelier and faster rhythm than the iambic.

=== Anapestic ===
The anapestic (or anapaestic) tetrameter catalectic is used in comedy. It is described as a 'dignified' meter and is used in Aristophanes' Clouds (961-1009) for the speech of the character Just Argument describing how boys were expected to behave in the good old days. It begins as follows:

λέξω τοίνυν τὴν ἀρχαίαν παιδείαν ὡς διέκειτο,
ὅτ’ ἐγὼ τὰ δίκαια λέγων ἤνθουν καὶ σωφροσύνη ’νενόμιστο.
πρῶτον μὲν ἔδει παιδὸς φωνὴν γρύξαντος μηδὲν ἀκοῦσαι·
εἶτα βαδίζειν ἐν ταῖσιν ὁδοῖς εὐτάκτως ἐς κιθαριστοῦ
τοὺς κωμήτας γυμνοὺς ἁθρόους, κεἰ κριμνώδη κατανείφοι.

| – – – – | – – – – || – – – – | u u – – |
| u u – u u – | u u – – – || – – u u – | u u – – |
| – – u u – | – – – – || – – – – | u u – – |
| – u u – – | – – u u – || – – – – | u u – – |
| – – – – | – – u u – || – – – – | u u – – |

"Well, I'll tell you how education was in the old days
when I flourished speaking right things and temperance was in fashion.
First of all it was not allowed to hear the voice of any boy grumbling,
secondly, they had to walk in the streets in an orderly way to the lyre-teacher's,
boys from the same village naked in a group, even if it was snowing like coarse meal."

Aristophanes also uses this metre for Socrates's solemn invocation summoning the Clouds in Clouds (263-274), and in the Frogs (589-604) he uses it when the late poet Aeschylus is explaining his views about modern poetry.

Anapaestic verse is always found in dimeters or tetrameters, each dimeter consisting of four feet. The most common type of foot is the spondee (– –), followed by the anapaest (u u –), then the dactyl (– u u). The exact proportions of the different kinds of feet differ in different authors; for example, anapaests make up 26% of the feet of anapaestic verse in Sophocles, but 39% in Aristophanes; dactyls make up 20% of anapaestic verse in Sophocles but only 6% in Aristophanes. In comedy a very small number of feet are proceleusmatic (u u u u).

=== Eupolidean ===
Other meters are also occasionally found in comedy, such as the Eupolidean. This is used in the second edition of Aristophanes' Clouds when the chorus leader steps forward in the persona of the poet himself and addresses the audience (518-562). The basic meter is | x x – x | – u u – | x x – x | – u – |, where the opening of each half is generally trochaic ( – u / – – ) but may occasionally be iambic ( u – / u u u ). Aristophanes uses the meter only here in his extant plays, although it is found occasionally in the surviving fragments of other playwrights. In this meter there is either a break (dieresis) in the middle of the line, or a caesura (word-break) after the first syllable of the second half. It is probable that it gets its name from the poet Eupolis, who may have used it. The speech in the Clouds starts as follows:

ὦ θεώμενοι κατερῶ πρὸς ὑμᾶς ἐλευθέρως
τἀληθῆ νὴ τὸν Διόνυσον τὸν ἐκθρέψαντά με.
οὕτω νικήσαιμί τ’ ἐγὼ καὶ νομιζοίμην σοφός,
ὡς ὑμᾶς ἡγούμενος εἶναι θεατὰς δεξιοὺς
καὶ ταύτην σοφώτατ’ ἔχειν τῶν ἐμῶν κωμῳδιῶν,
πρώτους ἠξίωσ’ ἀναγεῦσ’ ὑμᾶς, ἣ παρέσχε μοι
ἔργον πλεῖστον· εἶτ’ ἀνεχώρουν ὑπ’ ἀνδρῶν φορτικῶν
ἡττηθεὶς οὐκ ἄξιος ὤν· ταῦτ’ οὖν ὑμῖν μέμφομαι
τοῖς σοφοῖς, ὧν οὕνεκ’ ἐγὼ ταῦτ’ ἐπραγματευόμην.

| – u – u – u u – || u – – u – u – |
| – – – – – u u – | – u – – – u – |
| – – – – – u u – || – u – – – u – |
| – – – – – u u – | – u – – – u – |
| – – – u – u u – || – u – – – u – |
| – – – u – u u – || – – – u – u – |
| – – – u – u u – | – u – – – u – |
| – – – – – u u – || – – – – – u – |
| – u – – – u u – || – u – u – u – |

"O spectators, I will declare to you freely,
the truth, by Dionysus who brought me up.
May I so win and be thought intelligent
as, thinking you to be clever play-watchers,
and that this was the most intelligent of my comedies,
I thought it right that you should be the first to taste this play which cost me
the most work; on that occasion I had to retreat, defeated by vulgar men
though I didn't deserve it; I blame you for that,
intelligent though you are, on whose behalf I took so much trouble!"

== Lyric meters ==
Lyric meters (literally, meters sung to a lyre) are usually less regular than non-lyric meters. The lines are made up of feet of different kinds, and can be of varying lengths. Some lyric meters were used for monody (solo songs), such as some of the poems of Sappho and Alcaeus; others were used for choral dances, such as the choruses of tragedies and the victory odes of Pindar.

=== Ionic ===
The basic unit of the Ionic meter is the minor Ionic foot, also called Ionic a minore or double iamb, which consists of two short and two long syllables. An Ionic line consists of two of these feet:

| u u – – | u u – – |

Occasionally a line will be catalectic, that is, missing the final syllable. Catalectic lines tend to come at the end of a period or stanza:

| u u – – | u u – |

The process of anaclasis, the metathesis of a short and a long syllable, yields a second pattern called Anacreontic:

| u u – u | – u – – |

Beyond these more common feet, a great amount of variation is possible within the Ionic meter because of anaclasis, catalexis, resolution (meter) and syncopation.

This meter is used by the lyric poets Alcman, Sappho and Alcaeus and also in some of the choral songs of certain tragedies and comedies. An example is the following from Euripides' Bacchae 519-28. It is a choral song addressed to the stream Dirce, about the birth of the god Dionysus, whose mother Semele was struck by lightning. Like all choral songs in Athenian tragedy, it imitates the Doric α /ā/ in many words instead of η /ē/ (e.g. Δίρκα for Δίρκη 'Dirce'):

Ἀχελῴου θύγατερ,
πότνι’ εὐπάρθενε Δίρκα,
σὺ γὰρ ἐν σαῖς ποτε παγαῖς
τὸ Διὸς βρέφος ἔλαβες,
ὅτε μηρῷ πυρὸς ἐξ ἀ-
θανάτου Ζεὺς ὁ τεκὼν ἥρ-
πασέ νιν, τάδ’ ἀναβοάσας·
Ἴθι, Διθύραμβ’, ἐμὰν ἄρ-
σενα τάνδε βᾶθι νηδύν·
ἀναφαίνω σε τόδ’, ὦ Βάκ-
χιε, Θήβαις ὀνομάζειν.

| u u – – | u u – |
| u u – – | u u – – |
| u u – – | u u – – |
| u u – u u | u u – |
| u u – – | u u – – |
| u u – – | u u – – |
| u u – u u | u u – – |
| u u – u | – u – – |
| u u – u | – u – – |
| u u – – | u u – – |
| u u – – | u u – – |

"Daughter of Achelous,
queenly virgin Dirce –
for you once in your streams
received that baby of Zeus,
when in his thigh from the immortal fire
Zeus his father snatched him,
after shouting these words:
'Go, Dithyrambus,
enter this, my male womb;
I proclaim, Bacchian one, that they will name
you this in Thebes.'"

A variation of the ionic metre involves the use of choriambic feet | – u u – |, as in this choral song from Sophocles' Oedipus Tyrannus (484-495). It starts with four choriambic dimeters, but then becomes Ionic (although some scholars analyse the whole ode as ionic).

δεινὰ μὲν οὖν, δεινὰ ταράσ-
σει σοφὸς οἰωνοθέτας
οὔτε δοκοῦντ’ οὔτ’ ἀποφάσ-
κονθ’· ὅ τι λέξω δ’ ἀπορῶ.
πέτομαι δ’ ἐλπίσιν οὔτ’ ἐν-
θάδ’ ὁρῶν οὔτ’ ὀπίσω.

τί γὰρ ἢ Λαβδακίδαις
ἢ τῷ Πολύβου νεῖ-
κος ἔκειτ’, οὔτε πάροιθέν
ποτ’ ἔγωγ’ οὕτε τανῦν πω
ἔμαθον, πρὸς ὅτου δὴ
βασανίζων βασάνῳ
ἐπὶ τὰν ἐπίδαμον
φάτιν εἶμ’ Οἰδιπόδα Λαβδακίδαις
ἐπίκουρος ἀδήλων θανάτων.

| – u u – | – u u – |
| – u u – | – u u – |
| – u u – | – u u – |
| – u u – | – u u – |
| u u – – | u u – – |
| u u – – | u u – |

| u u – – | u u – |
| – – | u u – – |
| u u – – | u u – – |
| u u – – | u u – – |
| u u – | u u – – |
| u u – – | u u – |
| u u – | u u – – |
| u u – – | u u – – | u u – |
| u u – | u u – – | u u – |

"Terrible things, therefore, terrible things the wise prophet stirs up
that I can neither agree to nor deny; I am at a loss what to say.
I am a-flutter with forebodings, seeing neither the present nor the future.

For what quarrel there was either for the family of Labdacus
or for the son of Polybus neither ever before or now
did I learn; enquiring from whom with a test,
shall I go against the public reputation of Oedipus
to assist the family of Labdacus in the unsolved death?"

=== Aeolic ===
Aeolic verse mostly refers to the type of poems written by the two well-known poets of Lesbos, Sappho and Alcaeus, which was later imitated by Latin writers such as Horace. A development of Aeolic verse, but less regular and more varied, is found in the choral odes of Pindar and Bacchylides.

The Aeolic meter is built upon two kinds of lines, the Glyconic and the Pherecratean. Both have the choriamb | – u u – | as their nucleus. The Glyconic can be represented as follows:

x x | – u u – | u –

The Pherecratean:

x x | – u u – | –

An unusual feature, not found in most other types of Greek verse, is the double anceps (x x) at the beginning of the line. In Sappho and Alcaeus also the number of syllables in each line is always the same (that is, they are "isosyllabic"): a long syllable may not be substituted for two shorts or vice versa. In the later type of Aeolic written by Pindar, however, a long syllable may sometimes be resolved into two shorts.

Various patterns of Aeolic verse are found, some of which are named and organized here:

verse-end	verse-begin		
verse-end	×× (aeolic base)	× ("acephalous line")	no anceps syllables
˘ ¯ ¯	hipponactean^{× ×} ^{|} ¯ ˘ ˘ ¯ ^{|} ˘ ¯ ¯	hagesichorean^{×} ^{|} ¯ ˘ ˘ ¯ ^{|} ˘ ¯ ¯	aristophanean ¯ ˘ ˘ ¯ ^{|} ˘ ¯ ¯
˘ ¯	glyconic^{× × |} ¯ ˘ ˘ ¯ ^{|} ˘ ¯	telesillean^{× |} ¯ ˘ ˘ ¯ ^{|} ˘ ¯	dodrans ¯ ˘ ˘ ¯ ^{|} ˘ ¯
¯	pherecratean^{× × |} ¯ ˘ ˘ ¯ ^{|} ¯	reizianum^{×} ^{|} ¯ ˘ ˘ ¯ ^{|} ¯	adonean ¯ ˘ ˘ ¯ ^{|} ¯

Further types arise when the choriamb at the centre of the verse is extended, for example to | – u u – u u – | or | – u u – – u u – – u u – |.

A simple type of Aeolic metre is the Sapphic stanza favoured by the poet Sappho, which consists of three lines in the form | – u – x – u u – u – – | followed without a break by | – u u – – |. The most famous poem of this type, written in the Aeolic dialect spoken in Sappho's time on the island of Lesbos, is Sappho 31, which begins as follows:

φαίνεταί μοι κῆνος ἴσος θέοισιν
ἔμμεν᾽ ὤνηρ, ὄττις ἐνάντιός τοι
ἰσδάνει καὶ πλάσιον ἆδυ φωνεί-
σας ὐπακούει.

| – u – – – u u – u – – |
| – u – – – u u – u – – |
| – u – – – u u – u – – |
| – u u – – |

"That man seems to me to be equal to the gods
who is sitting opposite you
and hears you nearby
speaking sweetly."

Another kind of Aeolic meter, the hagesichorean (see above), was so named by M.L. West after a line (57) in Alcman's Partheneion, which goes:

Ἁγησιχόρα μὲν αὕτα
| – – u u – u – – |
"This is Hagesichora"

The hagesichorean meter is used for all four lines of the famous Midnight poem attributed to Sappho:

Δέδυκε μὲν ἀ σελάννα
καὶ Πληΐαδες, μέσαι δέ
νύκτες, πάρα δ' ἔρχετ' ὤρα,
ἔγω δὲ μόνα κατεύδω.

| u – u u – u – – |
| – – u u – u – – |
| – – u u – u – – |
| u – u u – u – – |

"The moon and the Pleiades have set,
it is midnight,
and the time is passing,
but I sleep alone."

=== Dactylo-epitrite ===
Two elements comprise dactylo-epitrite (formerly also called Doric) verse, the one dactylic, the other epitrite. The dactylic metron is called the Prosodiac and is variable in the number of dactyls that proceed the final spondee or long syllable. Thus it is represented as follows:

| – u u – u u – (–) |

or

| – u u – u u – u u – (–) |

or

| – u u – (–) |

The epitrite is represented as follows:

| – u – x |

The dactylo-epitrite meter is often used for choral songs by Pindar and Bacchylides and also in the choruses of tragedies, for example (from Aeschylus' Prometheus Bound, 542-51):

μηδάμ᾽ ὁ πάντα νέμων
θεῖτ᾽ ἐμᾷ γνώμᾳ κράτος ἀντίπαλον Ζεύς,
μηδ᾽ ἐλινύσαιμι θεοὺς ὁσίαις θοίναις ποτινισομένα
βουφόνοις παρ᾽ Ὠκεανοῦ πατρὸς ἄσβεστον πόρον,
μηδ᾽ ἀλίτοιμι λόγοις·
ἀλλά μοι τόδ᾽ ἐμμένοι καὶ μήποτ᾽ ἐκτακείη.

| – u u – u u – | (prosodiac)
| – u – – | – u u – u u – – | (epitrite + prosodiac)
| – u – – | – u u – u u – – | – u u – u u – | (epitrite + prosodiac + prosodiac)
| – u – u | – u u – u u – – | – u – | (epitrite + prosodiac + epitrite)
| – u u – u u – | (prosodiac)
| – u – u | – u – – | – u – – – – | (epitrite + epitrite + epitrite)

"May he who apportions everything, Zeus, never
set his power in opposition to my purpose,
nor may I be idle in approaching the gods with holy feasts
of slain oxen beside the unending stream of my father Ocean,
nor may I sin with words;
but may this remain in me and never melt away."

Meters such as the above, which consist of a mixture of dactyls and trochees, are sometimes referred to as "logaoedic" ("speech-song"), since they are halfway between the irregularity of speech and regularity of poetry.

=== Mixed meter ===
Choral song is often in a mixture of meters, such as the Partheneion of the 7th century BC Spartan poet Alcman. In the first eight lines of each stanza, trochaic rhythms predominate, mixed with the hagesichorean, which gets its name from this poem. Lines 9 to 12 of each stanza are trochaic, breaking into dactyls for the last two lines. The stanza below is part of the song only (lines 50-63):

ἦ οὐχ ὁρῆις; ὁ μὲν κέλης
Ἐνετικός· ἁ δὲ χαίτα
τᾶς ἐμᾶς ἀνεψιᾶς
Ἁγησιχόρας ἐπανθεῖ
χρυσὸς ὡς ἀκήρατος·
τό τ᾽ ἀργύριον πρόσωπον,
διαφάδαν τί τοι λέγω;
Ἁγησιχόρα μὲν αὕτα·

ἁ δὲ δευτέρα πεδ᾽ Ἀγιδὼ τὸ ϝεῖδος
ἵππος Ἰβηνῶι Κολαξαῖος δραμήται·
ταὶ Πεληάδες γὰρ ἇμιν
ὀρθρίαι φᾶρος φεροίσαις
νύκτα δι᾽ ἀμβροσίαν ἅτε σήριον
ἄστρον ἀυηρομέναι μάχονται·

| – – u – u – u – |
| u u u u – u – – |
| – u – u – u – |
| – – u u – u – – |
| – u – u – u – |
| – – u u – u – – |
| u u u – u – u – |
| – – u u – u – – |

| – u – u | – u – u | – u – – |
| – u – – | – u – – | – u – – |
| – u – u | – u – u |
| – u – – | – u – – |
| – u u – u u – u u – u u |
| – u u – u u – u – – |

"Do you not see? The one is an Enetican
racehorse; but the mane
of my cousin
Hagesichora blooms
like pure gold,
and her silver face –
what shall I say openly? –
that is Hagesichora!

But she, Agido, second in beauty,
runs after her, a Colaxaean horse to an Ibenian;
for the Pleiades fight for us
as we carry the robe (plough?) for the dawn goddess,
rising through the ambrosian night
like the star Sirius."

If φάρος "a plough (plow)" is read in the 12th line above instead of φᾶρος "a robe", the metre of the line will be

| – u – u | – u – – |

A similar mixture of trochaic and dactylic meter is also found in some of Pindar's choral odes, such as the First Olympian Ode, which begins as follows with a glyconic and a pherecratean, but soon becomes more irregular:

ἄριστον μὲν ὕδωρ, ὁ δὲ χρυσὸς αἰθόμενον πῦρ
ἅτε διαπρέπει νυκτὶ μεγάνορος ἔξοχα πλούτου·
εἰ δ’ ἄεθλα γαρύεν
ἔλδεαι, φίλον ἦτορ,
μηκέθ’ ἁλίου σκόπει
ἄλλο θαλπνότερον ἐν ἁμέρᾳ φαεννὸν ἄστρον ἐρήμας δι’ αἰθέρος,
μηδ’ Ὀλυμπίας ἀγῶνα φέρτερον αὐδάσομεν·

| u – – u u – u – | – u – u u – – |
| u u u – u – – u u – u u – u u – – |
| – u – u – u – |
| – u – u u – – |
| – u – u – u – |
| – u – u u u u – u – u – u – u u – – u – u – |
| – u – u – u – u – u u – – u – |

"Water is best, and gold, like a blazing fire
in the night, stands out above all lordly wealth.
But if you wish to sing of contests,
my dear heart,
look no further
for any other star warmer than the sun, shining by day through the lonely sky,
and let us not proclaim any contest greater than Olympia."

In his book on Pindaric metre, Kiichiro Itsumi characterises this ode as "amalgamated style", that is, a mixture of Aeolic and dactylo-epitrite rhythms.

=== Paeonic ===
The Paeonic meter is based primarily on two kinds of feet, the Cretic:

| – u – |

and the Bacchius:

| u – – |

By resolving the longs of these two feet, one may produce an additional two feet, named for the position of their long syllable, the First Paeon:

| – u u u |

and the Fourth Paeon:

| u u u – |

Adding an iamb to any of these creates a dochmiac. From the Cretic and the Bacchius, the Slow Dochmiacs:

| u – – u – | and | u – u – – |

and the Fast Dochmiacs:

| u u u – u – | and | u – u u u – |

Dochmiac rhythms are much used by the Athenian tragedians for agitated lamentations. An example is the following, from Aeschylus's play Seven Against Thebes (78ff):

θρέομαι φοβερὰ μεγάλ’ ἄχη·
μεθεῖται στρατός· στρατόπεδον λιπὼν
ῥεῖ πολὺς ὅδε λεὼς πρόδρομος ἱππότας·
αἰθερία κόνις με πείθει φανεῖσ’,
ἄναυδος σαφὴς ἔτυμος ἄγγελος.
ἔτι δὲ γᾶς ἐμᾶς πεδί’ ὁπλόκτυπ’ ὠ-
τὶ χρίμπτει βοάν· ποτᾶται, βρέμει δ’
ἀμαχέτου δίκαν ὕδατος ὀροτύπου.
ἰὼ ἰὼ
ἰὼ θεοὶ θεαί τ’ ὀρόμενον κακὸν
βοᾷ τειχέων ὕπερ ἀλεύσατε.

| u u – u u u u u u – |
| u – – u – | u u u – u – |
| – u u u u u – | u u u – u – |
| – u u – u – | u – – u – |
| u – – u – | u u u – u – |
| u u u – u – | u u u – u –|
| u – – u – | u – – u – |
| u u u – u – | u u u u u u – |
| u – u – |
| u – u – u – | u u u – u – |
| u – – u – | u u u – u – |

"I wail fearful loud cries of distress;
an army has been let loose; having left the camp
a great host of horsemen, look!, is flowing, rushing ahead;
the dust which appears in the air persuades me,
a speechless but clear, true messenger;
and in addition the plain of my land, resounding with hoofs,
brings a cry to my ear; it flies and roars
like water which cannot be fought against pouring from a mountain.
o, o!
o gods and goddesses, with a shout over the walls
ward off this evil which has been stirred up!"

== Vocabulary ==
Anaclasis – an interchange of the final long syllable of the first metron with the opening short syllable of the second.

Catalexis – Absence of a syllable in the last foot of a verse.

Metron – Each of a series of identical or equivalent units, defined according to the number and length of syllables, into which the rhythm of a line of a particular metre is divided.

Resolution – The substitution of two short syllables for a single long one; the result of such a substitution.

Syncopation – Suppression of a short or anceps
