= Terzina =

Terzina may refer to:

- Tercet, three-lined poetic form
- In music, triplet
