= Carlyle–Emerson correspondence =

Letters written between Thomas Carlyle and Ralph Waldo Emerson

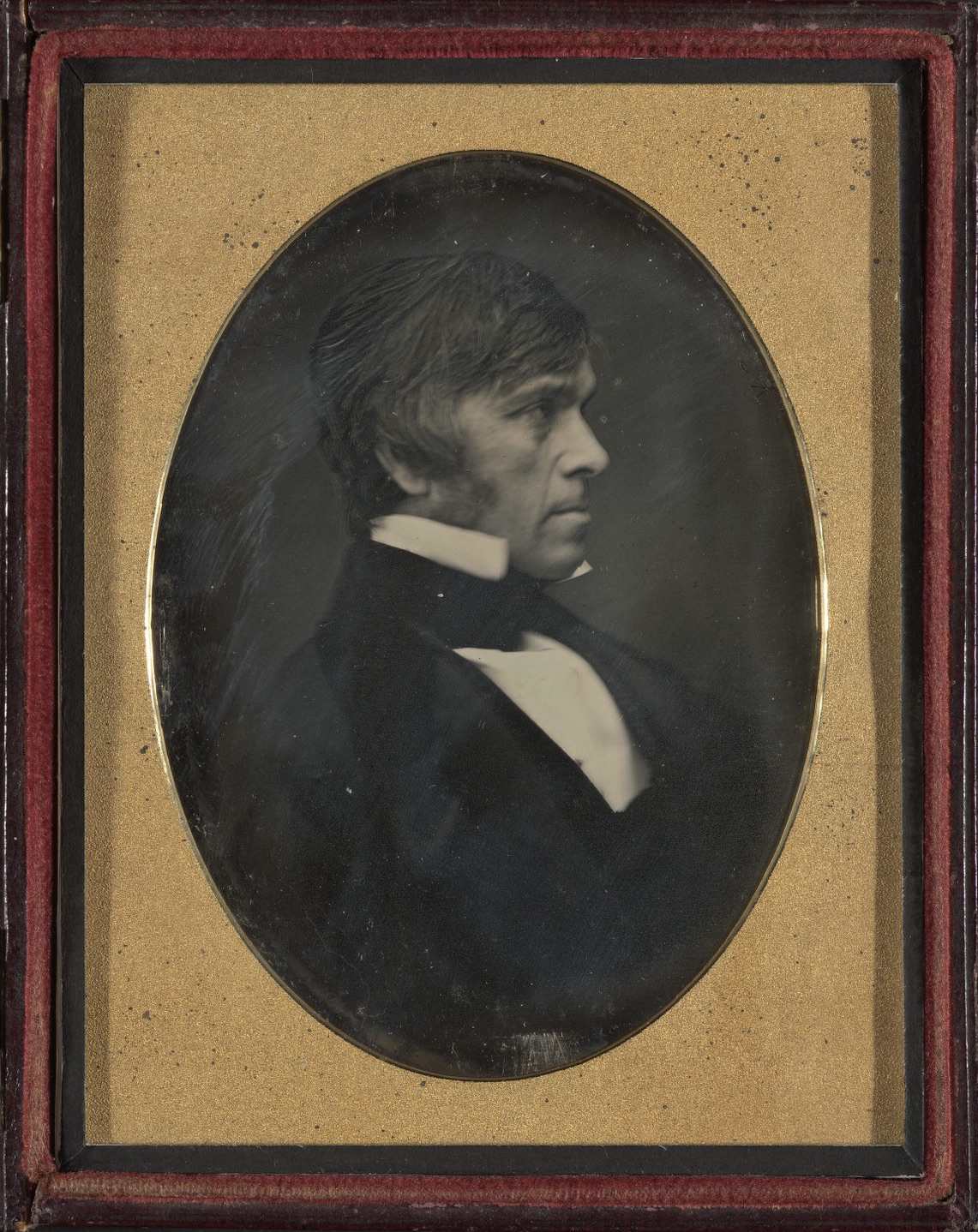
Daguerreotype of Thomas Carlyle, mailed to Emerson 30 April 1846

The Carlyle–Emerson correspondence is a series of letters written between Thomas Carlyle (1795–1881) and Ralph Waldo Emerson (1803–1882) from 14 May 1834 to 20 June 1873. It has been called "one of the classic documents of nineteenth-century literature."

== Carlyle and Emerson ==
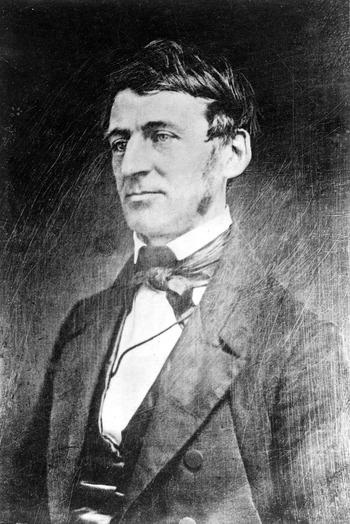
Daguerreotype of Ralph Waldo Emerson, 1846

Emerson had read Carlyle's early anonymous essays on German literature at least as early as 1827, and with great enthusiasm, calling them "by far the most original and profound essays of the day." Emerson, like many other Americans of his generation, felt that Carlyle was of a kindred spirit, and looked to the Scotsman as a teacher and guide through the perils of religious doubt.

On Christmas day, 1832, Emerson began a tour of Europe, having recently resigned from the ministry. Carlyle, who had never heard of Emerson, occupied a central place in the latter's itinerary, and Emerson's dissatisfaction with Rome and Paris built up his anticipation of meeting Carlyle. In April 1833, Emerson met Gustave d'Eichthal in Rome, a friend of Carlyle's, who agreed to write Emerson a letter of introduction to Carlyle. d'Eichthal also gave Emerson a letter of introduction to John Stuart Mill, another friend of Carlyle's, which asked that Mill also write Emerson a letter of introduction. Mill hesitantly did so, writing to Carlyle that "I do not think [Emerson] a very hopeful subject." Carlyle was then living with his wife Jane Carlyle at Craigenputtock, a remote farmhouse in Dunscore, Dumfriesshire. Carlyle, though of a modest literary reputation, had received no visitors, and thus welcomed a guest, and decided beforehand that he should stay the night.

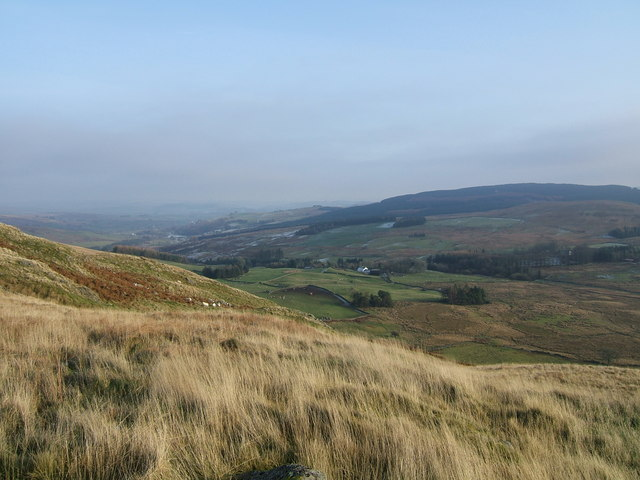
Northeastern view from Craigenputtock Hill

On Sunday, 25 August, Emerson hired a gig and rode sixteen miles to Carlyle's estate. The Carlyles convinced Emerson to turn away his carriage. Carlyle and Emerson walked among the hills, talking "thro' the whole Encyclopedia." Nearly twenty-four hours later, the gig arrived to retrieve Emerson. Carlyle did not accompany Emerson to the top of the hill; he "preferred to watch him mount and vanish like an angel." Jane Carlyle similarly recorded that "It was like the visit of an angel". Emerson recorded the visit in his journal "a white day in my years", and lamented the absence of Carlyle's company in his travels.

In the first letter, Emerson gives his impressions of Carlyle's Sartor Resartus (1833–34), the book which animates much of the early correspondence. Many of the letters in the period 1835–1847 consist of what Carlyle called Bibliopoly, the business of book publishing. Emerson was a key distributor of Carlyle's work in America during this time, and he personally arranged for the publication of Sartor, The French Revolution: A History (1837), and the Critical and Miscellaneous Essays (1838–39).

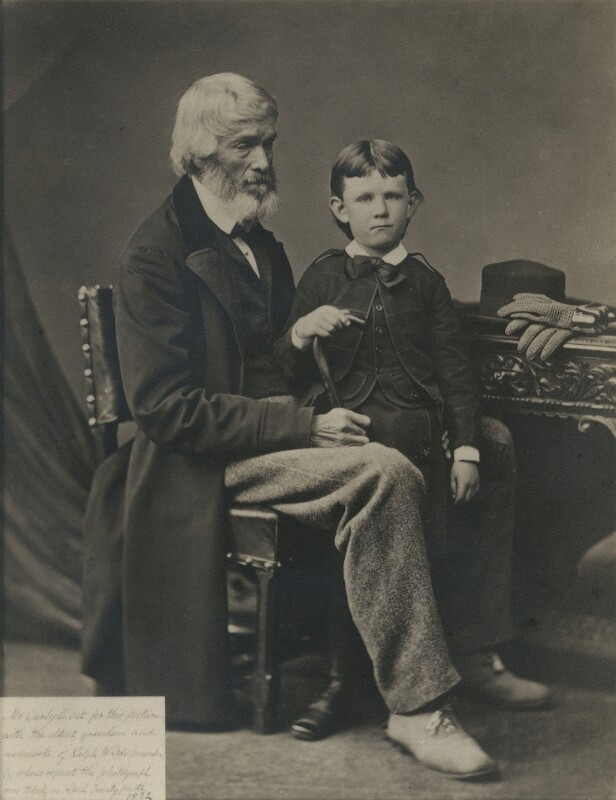
Carlyle at 76, with Emerson's grandson Ralph Forbes

In 1847, Emerson embarked on an English lecture tour, during which he made his second visit to the Carlyles on 25 October, now living at 5 Cheyne Row in Chelsea, London. He stayed until Friday, with incessant talk throughout, to the delight of Emerson, and to the slight irritation of a busy Carlyle. The passage of years revealed differences in the character of the two men that had not been apparent during their first meeting, and political differences caused some small quarrels during Emerson's stay. Emerson returned to London in March 1848, and recorded further tensions resulting from their differences in politics. Carlyle and Jane attended Emerson's lectures and took offense at some of his assertions. Despite these spasms, the two men decided to travel to Stonehenge for a weekend in July. The trip was a success, serving as a resolution of discord.

The letters from 1848–1872 document strains and gaps in the correspondence. In the late 1850s, the American Civil War became an issue that divided them, as Emerson became an abolitionist, and Carlyle sympathized with the Confederacy. This, along with Emerson's increasing activity and steadily declining faculties, meant that his responses to Carlyle's letters were less frequent, to Carlyle's distress. Still, photographs were exchanged, and in the early 1870s, Carlyle became a friend of Emerson's family.

Emerson visited Carlyle in November 1872, shortly after his house burned down. In several meetings spread over a week, they walked the streets of London and conversed without quarrel; Lidian Emerson observed Carlyle's reception of Emerson as "most lovely and touching". Emerson was in poor health with a fading mind, and Carlyle tempered his spirit accordingly. Emerson returned to London in April 1873, visiting Carlyle for the last time, and spent time with him in "real comfort".

In 1880, Carlyle gave Moncure D. Conway a parting message. "Give my love to Emerson. I still think of his visit to us at Craigenputtock as the most beautiful thing in our experience there." Carlyle died on 5 February 1881. On 10 February Emerson was asked to speak at Massachusetts Historical Society. Not without difficulty, he read a paper, "Impressions of Thomas Carlyle in 1848", a compilation of earlier letters and journals. In April 1882, the month of his death, when he was experiencing severe memory loss, he pointed to a photograph of Carlyle which hung on the wall and said, "That is my man, my good man!"

== First edition ==
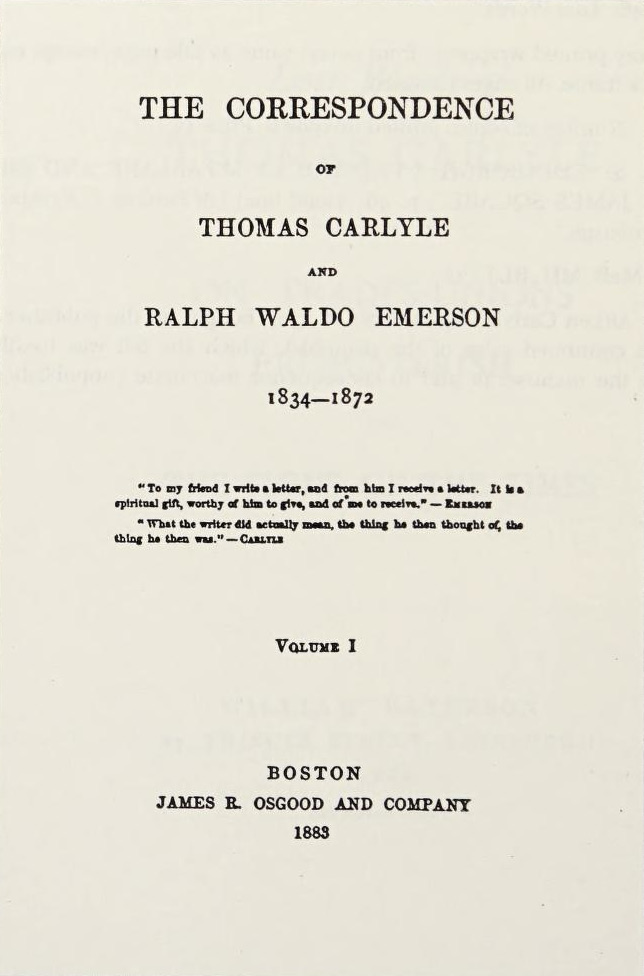
Title page of the first American edition

In 1870, Emerson decided to have his "ninety or so" letters from Carlyle copied and bound. Three years later, he asked Charles Eliot Norton to accept the bequest of the Carlyle letters, which Norton accepted. In 1875, Emerson's daughter asked Carlyle to bequeath to her the Emerson letters, which Carlyle did.

In 1882, Norton read the first two volumes of James Anthony Froude's controversial four-volume biography of Carlyle with indignation. Norton determined to speedily edit and publish the correspondence, in order to "redress the wrong that Froude has done." He acquired the Emerson letters from Emerson's daughter and began negotiations with publishers, deciding on James R. Osgood and Company. When Norton examined the collection of Emerson letters, he found that at least thirty-four were missing, while several British magazines were publishing copies of the missing letters; it became apparent that they had been stolen. Carlyle's niece suspected a man named Frederick Martin who had been formerly employed by Carlyle as an amanuensis. Moncure D. Conway, then in London, was approached by Martin, who offered the manuscript of Carlyle's Reminiscences of My Irish Journey in 1849, to the suspicion of Conway. Conway learned that some of Emerson's letters which had been printed were acquired by the magazines from the underground market in London. Conway discovered that Martin was a member of a group which dealt in pirated autographs and manuscripts and visited their place of operation. He was told that the woman in possession of the letters would visit his house if he so desired. She did the next day, bringing only four letters. Conway and his wife treated the woman graciously, and after her next two visits, Conway had copies of twenty-seven letters, which he promptly mailed to Norton.

There were 173 letters in all, 89 by Carlyle and 84 by Emerson. By the third edition in 1899, an additional 18 letters had been found and incorporated. The first edition was advertised in the New-York Tribune for 24 February 1882 as "doubtless the most interesting correspondence ever published." A French translation appeared in 1912.

== Reception ==
Richard Herne Shepherd in The Gentleman's Magazine called it "a history of one of the most beautiful and remarkable friendships hitherto recorded in literary annals." Alexander Ireland in The Academy thought it "certain to take a permanent place among the records of literary friendship." Edwin Percy Whipple in The North American Review greeted it as "a book which is destined to last for a century or two, at least." The correspondence drew favourable comparisons to Petrarch's Epistolae familiares.

John Ruskin found Emerson's letters "infinitely sweet and wise," but he was "vexed . . . and partly angered" by Carlyle's, with their "perpetual 'me miserum'." George Edward Woodberry in The Atlantic Monthly found fault with Emerson: "It is pitiful to read Carlyle's appeals against his friend's silence". James Freeman Clarke noted the "stately, elaborate style on both sides."

Matthew Arnold read them during his American lecture tour, giving his thoughts during the lectures. He suggested that the best of Carlyle was to be found in his letters: "I should not wonder if really Carlyle lived, in the long run, by such an invaluable record as that correspondence between him and Emerson."

Henry James thought highly of Carlyle as an epistolary writer. "Carlyle takes his place among the first of English, among the very first of all letter-writers." Echoing Arnold, James predicted that Carlyle's letters would outlast his works. James saw artistic value in the correspondence: "the united pair presents itself in something of the uplifted relief of a group on canvas or in marble." He also noted the literary quality of the work, how the reader "feels a certain suspense . . . like a good novel", as well as the respective style of each writer.

The violent color, the large, avalanche-movement of Carlyle's style—as if a mass of earth and rock and vegetation had detached itself and came bouncing and bumping forward—make the efforts of his correspondent appear a little pale and stiff. There is always something high and pure in Emerson's speech, however, and it has often a perfect propriety—seeming, in answer to Carlyle's extravagances, the note of reason and justice.

William Allingham offered his own portrait of the pair: "Emerson to Carlyle—as an angel to a genie, as light to fire. E. holds up a mild steady lamp, like the full moon; C. brandishes a huge torch."

Montgomery Schuyler's sonnet "Carlyle and Emerson" (1883) is included in several anthologies.

== Bibliography ==
- Allingham, William (1907). William Allingham's Diary 1847–1889 (Paperback ed.). London: Centaur Press (published 2000).
- Bufano, Randolph J. (1972). "Emerson's Apprenticeship to Carlyle, 1827–1848". American Transcendental Quarterly (13): 17–25.
- Burroughs, John (1882). "Carlyle and Emerson". The Critic. Vol. II. pp. 140–141.
- Conway, Moncure (1904). Autobiography. 2 vols. London.
- Conway, Moncure (1882). Emerson at Home and Abroad. Boston: James R. Osgood and Company.
- Emerson, Edward Waldo (1889). Emerson in Concord. Boston.
- Emerson, Ralph Waldo (1881). "Impressions of Thomas Carlyle in 1848". Scribner's Monthly. Vol. XXII. pp. 89–92.
- Emerson, Ralph Waldo (1904). Emerson, Edward Waldo (ed.). The Complete Works of Ralph Waldo Emerson. 12 vols. Boston: Houghton, Mifflin & Co.
- Gravett, Sharon (2004). "Emerson, Ralph Waldo". In Cumming, Mark (ed.). The Carlyle Encyclopedia. Madison and Teaneck, NJ: Fairleigh Dickinson University Press. pp. 145–149. ISBN 9780838637920.
- Harris, Kenneth Marc (1978). Carlyle and Emerson: Their Long Debate. Cambridge, Massachusetts: Harvard University Press. ISBN 9780674097551.
- Hartwig, George H. (1939). "An Immortal Friendship". The Hibbert Journal. 38 (1): 102–114.
- James, Henry Jr. (June 1883). "The Correspondence of Carlyle and Emerson". The Century Magazine. Vol. XXVI. pp. 277–284.
- Khun, Helmut (1948). "Carlyle, Ally and Critic of Emerson". Emory University Quarterly. 4 (3): 171–180.
- Norton, Charles Eliot, ed. (1883). The Correspondence of Thomas Carlyle and Ralph Waldo Emerson. Boston: James R. Osgood and Company.
- Pearsall, Robert (1955). "Carlyle and Emerson: Horses and Revolutions". South Atlantic Quarterly. 55 (2): 179–191. doi:10.1215/00382876-55-2-179. S2CID 257871978.
- Slater, Joseph, ed. (1964). The Correspondence of Emerson and Carlyle. New York and London: Columbia University Press.
- Sloan, J. M. (1921). "Carlyle and Emerson". The Living Age. Vol. 309. pp. 486–489.
- Snider, Denton J. (1921). A Biography of Ralph Waldo Emerson: Set Forth as His Life Essay. Saint Louis: The William Harvey Miner Co., Inc.
- Sommer, Tim (2018). "Shakespearean Negotiations: Carlyle, Emerson, and the Ambiguities of Transatlantic Influence". In Kerry, Paul E.; Pionke, Albert D.; Dent, Megan (eds.). Thomas Carlyle and the Idea of Influence. Madison and Teaneck, NJ: Fairleigh Dickinson University Press. pp. 129–140. ISBN 9781683930662.
- Sowder, William J. (1966). "Emerson and Carlyle". Emerson's impact on the British Isles and Canada. Charlottesville: University Press of Virginia. pp. 184–215.
- Tennyson, G. B. (1973). "Thomas Carlyle". In DeLaura, David J. (ed.). Victorian Prose: A Guide to Research. New York: The Modern Language Association of America. p. 64. ISBN 9780873522502.
- Thompson, Frank T. (1927). "Emerson and Carlyle". Studies in Philology. 24 (3): 438–453. ISSN 0039-3738. JSTOR 4171979.
- Wilson, P. (1898). "Carlyle and Emerson: A Comparison". Leaders in literature; being short studies of great authors in the nineteenth century. Edinburgh: Oliphant, Anderson & Ferrier. pp. 47–72.
