= Ragale =

Ragale (Kannada: ರಗಳೆ Ragaḷe) is a type of meter in Kannada prosody that is used in Kannada poetry. This meter can usually have as many padas of syllables divided into two groups of various fixed number of matra in each line. It is the most prevalent meter of the Old Kannada poets Harihara and Raghavanka.

Lalita Ragale, Mandānila Ragale, Utsāha Ragale are variations we see in the use of Ragale meter.

== Variations ==
Ragale meters
| Name | syllable groups per pada | time units |
|---|---|---|
| Lalita | four | five |
| Mandanila | four | four |
| Utsaha | four | three |

Sarala Ragale is the modern version where the rules are flexible and it does not strictly adhere to any of the ragale forms enlisted above but largely retains the Ragale form. Mahachandssu used by Kuvempu is a variation of Sarala Ragale.

== See also ==
- Anapaest
- Dactyl
- Systems of scansion
- Trochee
