= Ebenezer Jones =

British poet (1820–1860)

- Born: January 20, 1820; Islington, London, England
- Died: 14 September 1860 (aged 40)
- Occupation: Poet

Ebenezer Jones (20 January 1820 – 14 September 1860) was an English poet who wrote a good deal of poetry of very unequal merit, but at his best shows a true poetic vein. He was befriended by Robert Browning and Christina Rossetti.

== Life ==
He was born in Canonbury Square, Islington, London, on 20 January 1820. His father was of Welsh background; his mother, Hannah Sumner, was of an Essex family. They were strict Calvinists. His father died, and at the age of 17 he worked as a clerk in a city firm connected with the tea-trade.

Jones was for a short time a follower of Robert Owen. He assisted his friend W. J. Linton with political journalism, and worked for the radical publishers John Cleave and Henry Hetherington. Jones went down with consumption, and died on 14 September 1860.

== Works ==
Jones as a poet was influenced by Percy Shelley and Thomas Carlyle, and wrote in an exaggerated style. Studies of Sensation and Event (1843) was a critical failure, though not with Bryan Waller Procter and Richard Hengist Horne. Three late poems, "To the Snow", "To Death" and "When the World is Burning", attracted attention.

Jones also wrote a short book entitled The Land Monopoly: The Suffering and Demoralization Caused by It; and the Justice and Expediency of its Abolition, published in 1849.

=== Posthumous reputation ===
For a while Jones was forgotten. In 1870, however, Dante Rossetti wrote in Notes and Queries commented that he would some day be disinterred. William Bell Scott agreed, and in 1878 Richard Herne Shepherd wrote a brief account of Ebenezer Jones. There were biographical papers in the Athenæum of September and October 1878, by Theodore Watts; and in 1879 Shepherd published a nearly complete edition of Studies of Sensation and Event (with author's corrections), additional pieces, a memoir by Ebenezer's brother Sumner, and reminiscences by Linton. A proposed second volume, containing prose writings and additional poems, preserved by his friend Horace Harral (1817–1905), never appeared.

== Family ==
Jones married Caroline Atherstone, niece of Edwin Atherstone, but they separated.
