= Richard Herne Shepherd =

English bibliographer

Richard Herne Shepherd (1842–1895) was an English bibliographer.

== Life ==
He was born at Chelsea early in 1842, a younger son of Samuel Shepherd, F.S.A. His grandfather, Richard Herne Shepherd (1775–1850), was from 1818 to 1848 a well-known Christian revivalist preacher at the Ranelagh Chapel, Chelsea, and published, besides sermons and devotional works, a volume of meditative verse entitled Gatherings of Fifty Years (1843).

Richard Herne Shepherd the younger was educated largely at home, developed a taste for literature, and published at the age of sixteen a copy of verses entitled Annus Moriens (1858).

Shepherd died in London on 15 July 1895.

== Works ==
In 1861 Shepherd issued an essay on The School of Pantagruel, in which he traced "Pantagruelism" in England from Rochester to Sterne. Subsequently, he edited booksellers' editions of the classics, including William Blake's Poems (1868 and 1874), Shelley's Poems (1871), Lamb's Poetry for Children (1872 and 1878), Chapman's Works (1874), Lamb's Works (1875), Ebenezer Jones's Poems (1879), Poe's Works (1884), Dickens's Speeches (1884), Dickens's Plays and Poems (1885), and Shelley's Prose Works (1888).

In 1869 Shepherd published Translations from Baudelaire (reissued 1877, 12mo); in 1873 he printed, with notes, Coleridge's tragedy Osorio, and in 1875 The Lover's Tale (of 1833) and other early uncollected poems of Tennyson (unearthed from albums and periodicals). Fifty copies were privately printed in 1875, but the volume was suppressed by injunction in the Court of Chancery.

In 1878 Shepherd published Elizabeth Barrett Browning's Earlier Poems without the assent of the writer's living representatives, who keenly resented his action. In the like character of literary chiffonnier, he prepared editions in the same year of the Juvenilia of Longfellow and Moore; and Sultan Stork, a volume of juvenile pieces by Thackeray, in 1887.

In 1878 there appeared an pasticcio of biographical and bibliographical gossip in Shepherd's Waltoniana. In the next year he obtained 150l. damages from the Athenaeum newspaper for an injurious review of his revised edition of Lamb's Poetry for Children. In 1881 he issued a dull Memoir of Thomas Carlyle, some passages in which had to be cancelled. Meanwhile, he studied bibliography, and prepared bibliographical accounts of Ruskin (1879), Dickens (1880, revised 1884), Thackeray (1881, revised 1887 and appended to Sultan Stork), Carlyle (1881), Mr. A. C. Swinburne (1883 and 1887), and Tennyson (issued posthumously in 1896, being an expansion of Tennysoniana, 1866 and 1879).

At the time of his death, Shepherd was preparing a bibliography of Coleridge for Notes and Queries, to which he was a frequent contributor.

== Sources ==
- Thomas Seccombe (contrib.) "Shepherd, Richard Herne,” in Dictionary of National Biography, London: Smith, Elder, & Co., (1885-1900) in 63 vols. [verbatim]
  - citing: [Memoir of the Rev. R. H. Shepherd, by his sons, 1854 (with portrait); Shepherd's Bibliography of Tennyson, 1896 (prefatory note); Times, 30 July 1895; Athenaeum, 1878, 1879, 1881, and 1895 ii. 323.]
