= Syzygy (poetry) =

In poetry, combination of two metrical feet into a single unit, similar to an elision

In poetry, a syzygy is the combination of two metrical feet into a single unit, similar to an elision.

Consonantal or phonetic syzygy is also similar to the effect of alliteration, where one consonant is used repeatedly throughout a passage, but not necessarily at the beginning of each word.
