= Octameter =

Octameter in poetry is a line of eight metrical feet. It is not very common in English verse. E.g.: -

Trochaic

Once upon a midnight dreary, while I pondered, weak and weary
Over many a quaint and curious volume of forgotten lore-
While I nodded, nearly napping, suddenly there came a tapping
As of some one gently rapping, rapping at my chamber door
(Edgar Allan Poe, "The Raven")

Iambic

I am the very model of a modern Major-General,
I've information vegetable, animal, and mineral,
I know the kings of England, and I quote the fights historical
From Marathon to Waterloo, in order categorical;
I'm very well-acquainted, too, with matters mathematical,
I understand equations, both the simple and quadratical,
About binomial theorem I'm teeming with a lot o' news,
With many cheerful facts about the square of the hypotenuse.
(W.S. Gilbert, "The Pirates of Penzance")

Anapestic (acephalous)

Ere frost-flower and snow-blossom faded and fell, and the splendour of winter had passed out of sight,
The ways of the woodlands were fairer and stranger than dreams that fulfil us in sleep with delight;
The breath of the mouths of the winds had hardened on tree-tops and branches that glittered and swayed
Such wonders and glories of blossomlike snow or of frost that outlightens all flowers till it fade
(A. C. Swinburne, "March: An Ode")

Dactyllic

There is, however, the occasional song, among them Marty Robbins's Grammy-winning (1961) "El Paso."

Out in the West Texas town of El Paso
I fell in love with a Mexican girl
Nighttime would find me in Rosa's Cantina
Music would play and Feleena would whirl
...
Off to my right I see five mounted cowboys
Off to my left ride a dozen or more
Shouting and shooting; I can't let them catch me
I have to make it to Rosa's back door ....

== See also ==
- Trochaic octameter
