= Paeon (prosody) =

Class of tetrasyllabic metrical feet

In prosody a paeon (or paean) is a metrical foot used in both poetry and prose. It consists of four syllables, with one of the syllables being long and the other three short. Paeons were often used in the traditional Greek hymn to Apollo called paeans. Its use in English poetry is rare. Depending on the position of the long syllable, the four paeons are called a first, second, third, or fourth paeon.

The cretic or amphimacer metrical foot, with three syllables, the first and last of which are long and the second short, is sometimes also called a paeon diagyios.

== Use in prose ==
The paeon (particularly the first and fourth) was favored by ancient prose writers since, unlike the dactyl, spondee, trochee, and iamb, it was not associated with a particular poetic meter, such as the hexameter, tetrameter, or trimeter, and so produced a sound not overly poetical or familiar. Regarding the use of the paeon in prose, Aristotle writes:

All the other meters then are to be disregarded for the reasons stated, and also because they are metrical; but the paean should be retained, because it is the only one of the rhythms mentioned which is not adapted to a metrical system, so that it is most likely to be undetected.

This was of special importance to orators (and in particular forensic orators) for whom, while the use of rhythmic elements was thought to produce memorable and moving speech, the use of the less obvious paeonic rhythm was thought to help them seem less contrived and thus more sincere, rendering their speech more effective. According to the Roman rhetorician Quintilian:

Above all it is necessary to conceal the care expended upon it so that our rhythms may seem to possess a spontaneous flow, not to have been the result of elaborate search or compulsion.

According to both Aristotle and Quintilian, the first paeon was considered particularly suitable at the beginning of a sentence, and the fourth at the end.
