= Kannada prosody =

Kannada prosody (Kannada: ಕನ್ನಡ ಛಂದಸ್ಸು, romanized: Kannaḍa Chandassu) refers to the distributions of meter, syllable timing, and verse length, among other characteristics, in Kannada poetry. Classical Kannada poetry, especially in Old Kannada and Middle Kannada, traditionally places a strong emphasis on verse forms over prose. While many meters have been borrowed from Sanskrit, native Kannada forms exist as well.

== History ==
The earliest Kannada work on prosody was the Guṇagāṅkīyam, which has been lost. The Kavirājamārga, the earliest Kannada work of poetics, discusses exclusively Sanskrit and Prakrit meters (though it uses native ones as well). One of the earliest extant works on prosody is the ಛಂದೋಂಬುಧಿ (Chandōmbudhi, "the Ocean of Prosody") of Nāgavarma I (10th century CE), often referred to as ನಾಗವರ್ಮನ ಛಂದಸ್ಸು (Nāgavarmana chandassu, "Nāgavarma's Prosody"), which was critically edited by Ferdinand Kittel. Nāgavarma I takes the Sanskrit and Prakrit Piṅgalas as his authorities, incorporating their descriptions of the various meters. It has been the standard treatise on Kannada prosody for centuries, with only some additions made in later generations of literary theorists.

The primary successor to Nāgavarma I's work is the Kavijihvābandhana ("the Binding of the Poet's Tongue") of Īśvarakavi (also known as Bāṇakavi). A.R. Krishnashastry, R. Narasimhacharya, and Kittel agree in dating the work to 16th century CE, mainly due to the inclusion of the Telugu alliterative device known as వడి (vaḍi). Certain modern Kannada scholars have attempted to preserve the use of Kannada prosody in modern poetry, such as T.V. Venkatachalashastry, though it is now primarily a resource for studying the classical tradition.

== Scansion and major features of Kannada prosody ==
Across Nāgavarma and other writers on Kannada prosody, there are two primary categories of meter: vṛtta and jāti. Vṛtta meters are those which count syllables (akṣara) and jāti are those that count morae (mātregaḷu). Many of the meters used in Kannada are drawn directly from Sanskrit or Prakrit, sometimes with differences in structure or simply the name. Verses are broken up into quarters (pāda, caraṇa, or aḍi), the first half of which are designated "prior" (pūrvārdha) and the second two, "latter" (uttarārdha). The precise configuration of any verse form is known as vinyāsa or prastāra.

Drawing from (the Sanskrit) Pingala's bhūtasaṃkhyā system, Nāgavarma gives names to different numbers based on a natural object which conventionally occurs in sets of those numbers. (Note: References to Chandōmbudhi sūtras here use Kittel's edition.) For example, kara ("hand") means "two" because hands occur in pairs and diśe (" direction") means "eight" because there are eight directions. The purpose of this system is to ease memorization of different meters. These numbers also serve to indicate the position of caesura (yati) and alliteration (prāsa) in a verse.

Kannada poetry is famously defined by its adherence to yatibhaṅga ("the violation of caesura"; also known as khaṇḍaprāsa, "split alliteration"), held up by the Kavirājamārga as an example of a Sanskrit rule being broken being a virtue of Kannada poetry. The other major feature of Kannada is dvitīyākṣaraprāsa ("second-letter alliteration"), which is the practice of repeating the same consonant in the second syllable of every verse quarter, with any vowel. This rule is found in the Kavirājamārga, where it is simply called prāsa. There are several other kinds, but second-letter alliteration is the most common and is prescriptive in classical Kannada verse. Interestingly, Nāgavarma used prāsa in his work but, according to Kittel, never gave a detailed overview of prāsa in his treatise. One recension of the Chandōmbudhi that does discuss prāsa includes the following verse: (Note: Words have been split in transliteration for ease of reading.)

ನುತಶಬ್ದಾಲಂಕಾರದೊ
ಳತಿಶಯಮದು ಕನ್ನಡಕ್ಕೆ ಸತತಂ ಪ್ರಾಸಂ /
ಕೃತಕೃತ್ಯಮಪ್ಪುದೆಲ್ಲರ
ಮತದಿಂದದು ತಪ್ಪೆ ಕಾವ್ಯಮೇಂ ಶೋಭಿಪುದೇ //

nuta-śabdālaṅkārado
ḷ atiśayam adu kannaḍakke satataṃ prāsaṃ /
kṛta-kṛtyam appud' ellara
matadind' adu tappe kāvyam ēn śōbhipudē

Among the praised ornaments of speech,
the most excellent for Kannada is always alliteration.
If one mistakes their work for a success
on just anyone's whims, does poetry shine?

In his Kavijihvābandhana, Īśvarakavi describes a Telugu alliterative device known as వడి (vaḍi). Kittel writes that it is a kind of prāsa in which the first sound of the first foot is repeated multiple times across other feet or lines, especially at caesuras; he also notes that Kanakadāsa used vaḍi in his Mōhanataraṅgiṇi. This indicates that Kannada poets were familiar with and sometimes used Telugu literary techniques. In his work, Īśvarakavi writes (addressing his teaching to his wife):

ವಡಿಯೆಂಬುದು ತೆಲುಗಿಂ ಪೇ
ಳ್ದೆಡೆಗಲ್ಲದೆ ಕನ್ನಡಕ್ಕೆ ಪೇಳಿದುದಿಲ್ಲಂ /
ಮಡದಿ ನಿನಗರಿಯಪೇಳ್ವೆಂ
ಕಡುರಾಗದೊಳಾಂಧ್ರಮಾರ್ಗ ಕಾಣಿಸಿದನಿತಂ //

vaḍiy embudu telugiṃ pē
ḷd' eḍeg' allade kannaḍakke pēḷidud' illaṃ /
maḍadi ninag' ariya pēḷveṃ
kaḍurāgadoḷ āndhra-mārga kāṇisid' anitaṃ //

That which is called vaḍi should not be used
in Kannada other than the places used in Telugu.
My dear wife, I will tell you with great pleasure
so that you know, that the way of Andhra may be seen.

=== Vṛtta ===
The vṛttas consist of three main groups: samavṛtta (even distribution of syllables in each line), ardhasamavṛtta (alternating syllable counts in each line), and viṣamavṛtta (uneven distribution of syllables across the lines). These are also sometimes called akṣaravṛttas, since they all count syllables (akṣaragaḷu) to be formed. These are also the meters typically thought to be borrowed from Sanskrit, since many are traceable to the Sanskrit Piṅgala's Chandassūtra (est. 3rd-2nd century BCE) or are found in Sanskrit treatises of the same period (like Kēdārabhaṭṭa's Vṛttaratnākara; 13th century CE).

Each samavṛtta belongs to a class known as chandas, which are defined by the number of syllables in every verse quarter, ranging from 1 to 31. Each syllable can be light/short (laghu/hrasva, L) and heavy/long (guru/dīrgha, G). Vṛttas are further described in terms of their syllabic feet (akṣaragaṇa), which are groups of three syllables with a certain combination of light and heavy syllables, as well as additional features, such as the location of a caesura (yati) or alliteration (prāsa).

These syllabic feet all are given names by Nāgavarma, assisting in the definition of various meters. However, the more common way they are taught (which Nāgavarma includes) is by the mnemonic yamātārājabhānasalagam, where if one takes a group of three syllables starting from each (up till sa), one obtains the name and structure of each foot (ex. yamātā = LGG, ya-gaṇa, bhānasa = GLL, bhagaṇa). Nāgavarma also gives special meanings for each foot, when used at the beginning of a verse. Īśvarakavi gives an even more elaborate presentation, dedicating the first chapter of the Kavijihvābandhana to teaching various uses and associations of each gaṇa with colors, body parts, and elements.

In principle, the different possible combinations of light and heavy syllables yield numerous possible vṛttas in each chandas, but Nāgavarma describes only a handful that are in use per chandas. For example, the chandas called dhṛti consists of 18-syllable quarters, which potentially has 262144 possible vṛttas. In reality, only four are typically used: mallikāmāle, kandarpajāta, aravinda, and haṃsaka. Another constraint on the number of possible vṛttas is a rule unique to Kannada, that no verse foot may begin with a light syllable followed by a heavy one (LG; known in English as an iamb or iambus).

The ardhasamavṛttas and viṣamavṛttas are quite few in number compared to the samavṛttas, but are described in the same way as above. One of the common viṣamavṛttas is the anuṣṭup-ślōka, which appears primarily as in invocatory verses (though it is not as widely used as it is in Sanskrit).

=== Jāti and native Kannada meters ===
Jāti meters are based on the arrangement of syllable-time in units known as morae. These meters may have a prescribed number of morae per quarter or per moraic foot (mātrāgaṇa) within a quarter. A mora (mātre) is defined as a unit of syllable time equal to one light (laghu) syllable, making heavy syllables (guru) worth two. There is also the overlong or prolated syllable (pluta), which is counted as three (sometimes marked in writing by the Kannada numeral ೩, "3"). This rarely occurs and is typically specified in yakṣagāna works, musical texts, and other contexts where a syllable may be given a longer-than-usual value for metrical reasons. A prolated syllable may be considered super-heavy in terms of syllabic weight, but it does not typically appear in akṣaravṛttas since the precise ordering of light and heavy syllables does not permit this optional lengthening of vowels.

Some of the well-known varieties of jāti include the ārye meters, which have lines with quarters of alternating length. Kanda padya is the most widely used ārye form, and is the preferred meter of exposition or explanation in Kannada. Some of main features of the ārye meters are their use of a limited number of moraic feet that have only four morae each, which are then used with conditions on where certain feet must be placed. Additionally, it is the only chandas in Kannada where the pair of a light and heavy syllable (LG) may begin a verse.

==== Ragaḷe ====
Another well-known jāti meter is the ragaḷe (also called raghaṭe), popularized by the Śaiva poet Harihara in his hagiographies on the Śaiva saints on South India. Arranged as a kind of couplet, the ragaḷe has a defined numbers of moraic feet with certain total morae in each line. There are three main varieties: mandānila (16 morae divided by 4 feet), lalite (20 morae by 4 feet), and utsāha/utsava (24 morae by 8 feet). There are other forms innovated by other poets, and it is known to be fairly flexible. Kittel identifies, for example, a peculiar form of the ragaḷe used by Vaiṣṇava Haridāsas.

==== Ṣaṭpadi ====
A more recent development of Kannada prosody is the ṣaṭpadi ("six-footed"), a type of six-line jāti meter. The pūrvārdha and uttarārdha both consist of two lines with a certain number of moraic feet followed by a third line with more feet. For example, kusuma ṣatpadi consists of two lines with two feet of 5 morae, followed by a line with three such feet; this is repeated twice to complete one stanza. Despite some recensions of Nāgavarma's Chandōmbudhi which show descriptions of the ṣaṭpadis, Kittel argues that these are latter day insertions, pointing to the sole mention of śaraṣaṭpadi (appearing as ṣaṭpadike) being with other dēvākṣara meters. The ṣaṭpadi varieties include śara, kusuma, bhōga, parivardhini, bhāmini, vārdhaka, and uddaṇḍa.

The ṣaṭpadi genre is thought to have been invented by Rāghavāṅka (13th century CE), and is closely related to the ragaḷe in terms of structure. It became enormously popular in the medieval period, which K. Marulasiddhappa calls "the ṣatpadi age" (ṣatpadi yuga). It was further popularized by Lakṣmīśa's Jaimini Bhārata (16th century CE), which itself inspired the work of poetics known as the Kannaḍa Kuvalayānanda ("The Kannada Joy of the Night Lily"). Composed in the 18th century CE, Jāyagauṇḍa, a ruler of Toragal, draws many of his examples of poetic ornaments and literary prowess from Lakṣmīśa's work, as well as Rāghavaṅka's Harīścandrakāvya, and the author renders the entire work in ṣatpadi meters.

==== Aṃśa or Dēvākṣara ====
The aṃśa meters are the main native metrical system of Kannada, classified as jāti because it counts morae. Kannada scholars believe that the aṃśa system developed for singing, which may be evidenced by its use in the sāṅgatya form. Sediyapu Krishna Bhatta notes that the term aṃśa to describe this metrical system is fairly new (dating to 1936), and that attempts to analogize it to the Tamil acai have previously been proposed. While Nāgavarma considers these to belong to the Kannada language, Krishna Bhatta qualifies this by saying that they may have resulted from Kannada's contact with Sanskrit and Prakrit, pointing to the fact the terms of scansion are borrowed from the latter's prosodical systems. Other forms which use the aṃśas include the tripadi, the five akkara meters (piri, dore, naḍu, eḍe, and kiṟi), caupadi, and gītike/gīta (not to be confused with an ārye meter known as gītike).

This class of meters is defined by its use of special metrical feet known as aṃśas or aṃśagaṇas, though Nāgavarma calls them dēvākṣara because they are named after the Hindu Trimūrti: Brahma, Viṣṇu, and Rudra. The brahmagaṇa ("Brahma foot"), viṣṇugaṇa ("Viṣṇu foot"), and rudragaṇa ("Rudra foot") each take two, three, and four heavy syllables, and produce additional variants by interchanging each or all with two light syllables. For example, the basic Brahma foot (GG) is permuted into GLL, LLG, and LLL. LLL results because a verse-final syllable is treated as heavy regardless of its actual value, and LGL is not possible because LG is not permitted in native Kannada verse. Krishna Bhatta explains that while the very first heavy syllable is always exchanged for two light syllables, the latter heavy syllables can only be exchanged for one, because it helps to sing lines in a tāḷa (a Carnatic beat-cycle) whose beats do not match the distribution of the morae in the verses.

== Books ==
- Nāga Varmā (1875), Ferdinand Kittel (ed.), Nagavarma's Canarese prosody
- Ferdinand Kittel (1903), A grammar of the Kannaḍa language in English: comprising the three dialects of the language (ancient, mediaeval and modern), pp. 185–198
