= Triadic-line poetry =

Triadic-line poetry or stepped line is a long line which "unfolds into three descending and indented parts". Created by William Carlos Williams, it was his "solution to the problem of modern verse" and later was also taken up by poets Charles Tomlinson and Thom Gunn.

== Background ==
Williams referred to the prosody of triadic-line poetry as a "variable foot", a metrical device to resolve the conflict between form and freedom in verse. Each of the three staggered lines of the stanza should be thought of as one foot, the whole stanza becoming a trimeter line. Williams' collections Journey to Love (1955) and The Desert Music (1954) contained examples of this form. This is an extract from "The Sparrow" by Williams:

Practical to the end,

it is the poem

of his existence

== See also ==
- Tristich
- Trimeter
- Tercet
