= Weak position (poetry) =

In the analysis of poetic meter, weak position is either of two things:

- In classical Greek and Latin scholarship, a short vowel is in "weak position" if the surrounding consonants would have permitted the syllable containing it to be pronounced either long or short.
- A syllable is in "weak position" if it is expected to be unstressed based on its metrical context.

== Vowels in weak position ==
Although no one can be certain what the phonological significance of vowel "length" or "value" was in ancient Greek, the rules of stress placement in literature of the Homeric and Attic eras are relatively well understood, not least through surviving commentary by the Latin grammarians. Some unstressed syllables seem to have admitted two pronunciations; in particular, the common combination of a short vowel followed by a stop and a liquid (as in the words δάκρυ, πατρός, ὅπλον, and τέκνον and the phrase τί δρᾷ) allows, but does not require, that the syllable containing the vowel be considered "long by position".

In Homeric Greek, the vowel in such a syllable was usually grammatically long, but could be grammatically short, depending on the needs of the meter (vice versa in Attic Greek). When short, such vowels are said to have, or be in, weak position.

Poetry in Classical Latin also took advantage of short vowels in weak position. The following examples show the same word scanned in two different ways in a single line (the diacritics on the relevant vowels indicate the length of the entire syllable, as required by the meter):

- quae pătribus pātres tradunt ab stirpe profecta (Lucr. 4.1222)
- gnatum ante ora pătris, pātrem qui obtruncat ad aras (Verg. A. 2.663)
- et Lycum nīgris oculis nĭgroque// crine decorum (Hor. Carm. 1.32.11f)
- et primo similis volŭcri, mox vera volūcris (Ov. Met. 13.607)

== Syllables in weak position ==
A broader metrical sense of "weak position" can arise in any language, either from a formal poetic meter (such as iambic pentameter or the Latin hendecasyllable) or from the use of parallel structure in prose for rhetorical effect. The prevailing rhythm of the poem or speech leads the listener (or reader) to expect a certain pattern of stressed and unstressed syllables. The consequences of violating that expectation may be illustrated with a line from John Milton's Paradise Lost:

Rocks, caves, lakes, fens, bogs, and shades of death

Here rocks, lakes, and bogs are all stressed syllables in weak positions, resulting in a dramatically slow and dolorous line among the surrounding blank verse. (This reading of one of Milton's most famous lines is familiar but not uncontested; see Bridges' analysis of Paradise Lost.) In the linguistics literature, this usage of "weak position" originated in Halle and Keyser (1966).
