= Riding rhyme =

Early form of heroic verse

Riding rhyme is an early form of heroic verse. It has been described variously as a couplet rhyme, in five accents, and as a decasyllabic couplet. It is derived from the rhythm of the poetry in parts of Chaucer's Canterbury Tales depicting the pilgrims as they rode along.

Other examples might be Browning's "How they Brought the Good News From Ghent To Aix", or W. H. Audens verses for "Night Mail".
