= Dochmiac =

Dochmiac (Ancient Greek: δοχμιακός, from δόχμιος 'across, aslant, oblique', or 'pertaining to a δοχμή or hand's-breath') is a poetic meter that is characteristically used in Greek tragedy, expressing extreme agitation or distress. They appear in every extant tragedy—N.C. Conomis counted a total of 1,985 in the tragedies of Aeschylus (528×), Sophocles (291×), and Euripides (1166×)—, but there are also examples in satyric drama and Aristophanes, where they are often paratragic in tone and impassioned.

== Metrical scheme ==
The base metrical scheme is: ‿ — — ‿ —, although any of the long syllables may be resolved (i.e., replaced by two shorts) and either of the two shorts may be replaced by a long (drag-in where the first is replaced, drag-out where the second is replaced, and double drag where both are replaced). Thus, in theory, 32 variants are possible, ranging from five longs — — — — — to eight shorts, ‿ ‿‿ ‿‿ ‿ ‿‿. The ones occurring most often are

‿ — — ‿ —,
‿ ‿‿ — ‿ —, and
— ‿‿ — ‿ —.

== Examples ==
Here is an example from Aeschylus' Seven against Thebes, lines 697-700, where the chorus in vain tries to withhold Oedipus' son Eteocles from a fatal battle with his brother Polynices. The first three lines here are pairs of — ‿‿ — ‿ — dochmiacs. Long syllables have been underlined. (The fourth line is a hagesichorean.) Note that dochmiacs and even whole lines can start and end in the middle of a word:

ἀλλὰ σὺ μὴ ʼποτρύνου· κακὸς οὐ κεκλή-
σῃ βίον εὖ κυρήσας· μελάναιγις δʼ· οὐκ
εἶσι δόμων Ἐρινύς, ὅταν ἐκ χερῶν
θεοὶ θυσίαν δέχωνται;

allà sù mḕ ’potrú/nou; kakòs ou keklḗ-
sēi bíon eû kurḗ/sas; melánaigis d’ ouk
eîsi dómōn Eri/nús, hótan ek kherôn
theoì thusían dékhōntai?
| – u u – u – | – u u – u – |
| – u u – u – | – u u – – – |
| – u u – u – | – u u – u – |
| u – – u – | u – – ||

No, don't you be excited; you won't be called a coward,
since you have prospered in life; but will not the black-shielded
Erinys (Avenging Spirit) leave your house, when from your hands
the gods will receive a sacrificial offering?

An example of the simplest double drag form (— — — — —) is when the chorus in Aeschylus' Suppliant Maidens, lines 892 and 901, twice sighs:

ὦ πᾶ, Γᾶς παῖ, Ζεῦ.
ô pâ, Gâs paî, Zeû.
| – – – – – |

O Father, Earth's son, Zeus!
