= Trochaic octameter =

Poetic meter with eight trochaic metrical feet per line

Trochaic octameter is a poetic meter with eight trochaic metrical feet per line. Each foot has one stressed syllable followed by an unstressed syllable. Trochaic octameter is a rarely used meter.

== Description and uses ==
The best known work in trochaic octameter is Edgar Allan Poe's "The Raven", which uses five lines of trochaic octameter followed by a "short" half line (in reality, 7 beats). By the end of the poem, the latter half line takes on the qualities of a refrain.

Another well-known work is Banjo Paterson's "Clancy of the Overflow", which uses four lines of trochaic octameter for each verse throughout. Other examples are Robert Browning's A Toccata of Galuppi's, Alfred Tennyson's Locksley Hall, and Rudyard Kipling's Mandalay. Lines in these poems are catalectic (' x ' x ' x ' x ' x ' x ' x ' ).

DUM	da

A line of trochaic octameter is eight of these in a row:

DUM	da	DUM	da	DUM	da	DUM	da	DUM	da	DUM	da	DUM	da	DUM	da

We can scan this with a 'x' mark representing an unstressed syllable and a '/' mark representing a stressed syllable. In this notation a line of trochaic octameter would look like this:

/	x	/	x	/	x	/	x	/	x	/	x	/	x	/	x

The following first verse from "The Raven" shows the use of trochaic octameter. Note the heavy use of dactyls in the second and fifth line, which help to emphasize the more regular lines, and the use of strong accents to end the second, fourth and fifth lines, reinforcing the rhyme:

We can notate the scansion of this as follows:

/	x	/	x	/	x	/	x	/	x	/	x	/	x	/	x
Once	up-	on	a	mid-	night	drear-	y,	while	I	pon-	dered	weak	and	wear-	y
/	x	/	x	/	x	/	x	/	x	/	x	/	x	/
O-	ver	many	a	quaint	and	cur-	ious	vol-	ume	of	for-	got-	ten	lore,
/	x	/	x	/	x	/	x	/	x	/	x	/	x	/	x
While	I	nod-	ded,	near-	ly	nap-	ping,	sud-	den	ly	there	came	a	tap-	ping,
/	x	/	x	/	x	/	x	/	x	/	x	/	x	/
As	of	some-	one	gent-	ly	rap-	ping,	rap-	ping	at	my	cham-	ber	door.
/	x	/	x	/	x	/	x	/	x	/	x	/	x	/
"'Tis	some	vis-	i-	tor,"	I	mut-	tered,	"tap-	ping	at	my	cham-	ber	door;
/	x	/	x	/	x	/
On-	ly	this,	and	noth-	ing	more

The following first two lines from "Womanizer" by Britney Spears also show trochaic octameter.

We can notate the scansion of this as follows:

/	x	/	x	/	x	/	x	/	x	/	x	/	x	/	x
Wo-	man-	i-	zer	Wo-	man	Wo-	man-	i-	zer	you're	a	Wo-	man-	i-	zer
/	x	/	x	/	x	/	x	/	x	/	x	/	x	/	x
Oh	-	Wo-	man-	i-	zer	Oh	-	you're	a	Wo-	man-	i-	zer	ba-	by

It becomes more important in another section of the chorus, in which words are repeated so as to maintain the meter.

/	x	/	x	/	x	/	x	/	x	/	x	/	x	/	x
Boy	don't	try	to	front	I	(I)	know	just	(just)	what	you	are	are	are.	-

== In other literatures ==
Trochaic octameter is popular in Polish and Czech literatures. It is because the main stress in Polish falls regularly on the penultimate syllable and in Czech on the first syllable. So all Polish and Czech two-syllable words are trochaic.

Niedostępna ludzkim oczom, że nikt po niej się nie błąka,
W swym bezpieczu szmaragdowym rozkwitała w bezmiar łąka

(Bolesław Leśmian, Ballada bezludna)

Stojím v šeru na skalině, o niž v pěnu, déšť a kouř
duníc, ječíc rozbíjí se nesmírného vodstva bouř.

(Svatopluk Čech, Písně otroka)

== See also ==
- Glossary of poetry terms
