= Meditative poetry =

Meditative poetry combines the religious practice of meditation with verse. Buddhist and Hindu writers have developed extensive theories and phase models for meditation.

== Christianity ==
In Christianity, meditation became a major devotional practice during the Middle Ages, closely associated with the life in monasteries. Definitions vary, but there were various attempts to distinguish meditation from contemplation. While meditation focuses the mind on a text, preferably from the Bible, contemplation will take a concrete object, such as a candle, to concentrate the thoughts of the mind. Both contemplation and meditation had the same end, to seek unity with God.

During the Protestant Reformation and Counter-Reformation, Jesuits like Ignatius of Loyola formalized the process of meditation, as a channeling of memory, understanding, and will. His method of meditation fell into three main parts: A) prayer and composition of place; B) the examination of points (analysis); C) the colloquies (the dialogue with God as a climax). Jesuits brought this practice to England. Calvinist and other Protestants adapted meditation to Bible studies.

Puritan meditation emphasized self-examination, applying Bible verses to contemporary, everyday life. In 1628, Thomas Taylor wrote a Puritan handbook Meditation from the Creatures, recommending to include images from the sensible world (metaphorical of God's glory). In colonial New England, Thomas Hooker defined meditation in The Souls Preparation for Christ (1632) as follows: "It is a settled exercise for two ends: first to make a further inquiry of the truth: and secondly, to make the heart affected therewith."

In the mid-17th century, meditation became a duty for Puritans, and in 1649/50 Richard Baxter's The Saints' Everlasting Rest became the standard Puritan text, at its core prescribing meditation. Like Taylor and Hooker, Baxter admitted the use of the senses; that is, he included contemplation with meditation, based on figural correspondences with the Bible. By including contemplation with meditation, the Puritans laid the foundation for a rich tradition of verse meditation in the USA from its colonial beginnings to the twenty-first century.

Soon Puritan ministers like Edward Taylor began to write meditations in verse, based on lines from the Bible and on sense perceptions, both allegorical of the greater glory of God. Anne Bradstreet provided the first published meditations purely based on the senses, celebrating nature's beauties as the creation of God. Using the analogy of Nature as God's second book, poetic meditations gradually secularized, replacing the old allegoric technique with a more symbolic reading of nature and affirming the self-reliant individual.

== Poetry ==
Ralph Waldo Emerson's essay Nature (1836) freed the meditation from its theological underpinnings and its reliance on the Bible. He encouraged poets to view nature as a storehouse of symbols that they could use merely relying on their imagination. Walt Whitman and Emily Dickinson took meditation into this direction and paved the way for Modernist and Postmodernist practices in poetry.

The method of the three main steps (the composition of place, examination of points, colloquies) had survived into the twentieth century in many poems, as had the devotional practice of verse meditation. Leading modernist poets like T. S. Eliot and Wallace Stevens began to fragmentize the process, blending thoughts and sense perceptions in a sort of spiritual diary. Postmodernist poets like John Ashbery deconstruct the contemplative aspect, the reference of the poem to an object outside itself, dissolving narrative or episodic structures of the spiritual diary in an ironic and open association, and thereby turning the poem itself into the object the reader can use for contemplation or meditation.

Meditative poetry has often been correlated to relaxation through poetry, which is simply using poetry to relax or relieve stress whenever someone is in need. It can also be seen in group visualization sessions where a speaker tries to get the audience to forget all about their stress by the use of calm and relaxing poetry.

== Sources ==
- Bevis, William W. (1988). Mind of Winter. Wallace Stevens, Meditation, and Literature. Pittsburgh: University of Pittsburgh Press.
- Daly, Robert (1978). God's Altar. The World and the Flesh in Puritan Poetry. University of California Press.
- Kaufmann, U. Milo (1966). The pilgrim's progress and traditions in Puritan meditation. New Haven: Yale University Press.
- Larson, Laura Louise (1994-01-01). The tradition of meditative poetry in America (dissertation). University of Connecticut. AAI9525676.
- Martz, Louis (1962) [1954]. The Poetry of Meditation. A Study of English Religious Literature of the Seventeenth Century (revised ed.). New Haven: Yale University Press.
- Nayeem, M. A.; Uddin, M. K. (2013). "Hamlet's procrastination is contrived from Puritan obedience". ASA University Review. 7 (1).
- Parini, Jay, ed. (1993). Columbia History of American Poetry. New York: Columbia University Press.
- Pearce, Roy Harvey (1961). The Continuity of American Poetry. Princeton: Princeton University Press.
