= Porson's law =

Feature of Ancient Greek prosody

Porson's law, or Porson's bridge, is a metrical law that applies to iambic trimeter, the main spoken metre of Greek tragedy. It does not apply to iambic trimeter in Greek comedy. It was formulated by Richard Porson in his critical edition of Euripides's Hecuba in 1802.

The law states that if a non-monosyllabic word ends on the ninth element of an iambic trimeter, the ninth element must be a short syllable.

== Different formulations of the law ==
A line of iambic trimeter runs as follows:

x – u – / x – u – / x – u –

In this scheme, there are three anceps elements, marked by the symbol x. These may be long or short.

Porson's law states that, if the third anceps (i.e. the bolded x above) is long and followed by a word break, then it must be a monosyllable.

A simpler summary of the law is provided in W. W. Goodwin's Greek Grammar:

When the tragic trimeter ends in a word forming a cretic (– u –), this is regularly preceded by a short syllable or by a monosyllable.

M. L. West states it slightly differently, to take account of a rare situation not accounted for by Porson, where the word-break is followed rather than preceded by a monosyllable (e.g. Euripides, Heraclidae 529):

When the anceps of the third metron is occupied by a long syllable, this syllable and the one following belong to the same word, unless one of them is a monosyllable.

== Normal lines ==
Some examples of normal tragic trimeters which do not break Porson's law are the following from Sophocles's Oedipus Tyrannus:

ἦ δοῦλος οὐκ ὠνητός, ἀλ**λ᾽ οἴ**κοι τραφείς.

ê doûlos ouk ōnētós, al**l᾽ oí**koi trapheís.

I was a slave, not bought but reared at home.

Here the ninth element is long, but does not end a word.

τὸν παῖδ᾽ ἔδωκας τῷδ᾽ ὃν οὗ**το**ς ἱστορεῖ;

tòn paîd᾽ édōkas tôid᾽ hòn hoû**to**s historeî?

Did you give this man the boy he is asking about?

Here the ninth element ends a word, but is short.

ἔδωκ᾽: ὀλέσθαι δ᾽ ὤφελον **τῇ**δ᾽ ἡμέρᾳ

édōk᾽: olésthai d᾽ ṓphelon **têi**d᾽ hēmérāi

I gave him – I wish I had died on that day!

Here ninth element ends a word and is long, but is a monosyllable.

== Breaches of Porson's law ==
=== In tragedy ===
In tragedy, as West observes, there are very few breaches of Porson's law. When the manuscript tradition, therefore, transmits a line that breaches Porson's law, this is taken as a reason for suspecting that it may be corrupt.

For example, the first line of Euripides's Ion, as transmitted in the mediaeval manuscript Laurentianus 32.2 (known as "L"), the main source for the play, reads:

u – u – / u – u – / – – u –

Ἄτλας, ὁ χαλκέοισι νώ**τοι**ς οὐρανὸν

Átlas, ho khalkéoisi nṓ**toi**s ouranòn

Translation by Lee

Atlas, who with his back of bronze [rubs up] against heaven ...

As Porson observed in his note on line 347 in his first (1797) edition of Euripides's Hecuba, this line is irregular, since -τοις in νώτοις is long, occurs at the third anceps, and is followed by word break. The line therefore breaks the law which Porson later formulated, and it is unlikely that Euripides wrote it as it stands. That the manuscript tradition is incorrect happens to be confirmed by a quotation of this line in a fragmentary papyrus of Philodemus. Philodemus's exact original text is uncertain, but it is reconstructed by Denys Page to read ὁ χαλκέοισιν οὐρανὸν νώτοις Ἄτλας (meaning the same as L's version), which does not break Porson's law, and therefore may be the correct text. Other scholars have suggested other possibilities as to what Euripides may originally have written.

=== In comedy ===
In comedy, on the other hand, breaches of Porson's law are very frequent, for example the following from Aristophanes's Clouds:

ἀπόλοιο δῆτ᾽ ὦ πόλεμε πολ**λῶ**ν οὕνεκα

apóloio dêt᾽ ô póleme pol**lô**n hoúneka

May you die, O war, for many reasons!

Here the ninth element is long and ends a word.

ὀνειροπολεῖ γὰρ καὶ καθεύ**δω**ν ἱππικήν.

oneiropoleî gàr kaì katheú**dō**n hippikḗn.

Even when he's asleep he dreams of horse-riding!

== Other similar laws ==
Several other similar laws or tendencies, such as (a) Knox's Iamb Bridge (stating that an iambic word, i.e. a word of shape u –, tends to be avoided in positions 9 and 10 in the iambic trimeter), (b) Wilamowitz's Bridge (stating that a spondaic word, of shape – –, is avoided in the same position), (c) Knox's Trochee Bridge (stating that a trochaic word, of shape – u, tends to be avoided in positions 8 and 9), and (d) the law of tetrasyllables (stating that words of the rhythm – – u x are avoided at the end or beginning of a line), have been discovered since Porson's time. These laws apply to different styles or periods of iambic-trimeter writing (neither of the first two bridges mentioned above apply in tragedy, for example). Details of these and other constraints on the trimeter are given in a 1981 article by A.M. Devine and L.D. Stephens.

== Possible explanations ==
Similar laws which have been discovered in the dactylic hexameter are that if a word ends the fifth or fourth foot it is almost never, or only rarely, a spondee (– –). The philologist W. Sidney Allen suggested an explanation for all these laws in that it is possible that the last long syllable in any Greek word had a slight stress; if so, then to put a stress on the first element of the last iambic metron, or the second element of the 4th or fifth dactylic foot in a hexameter, would create an undesirable conflict of ictus and accent near the end of the line.

An alternative hypothesis, supported by Devine and Stephens in their book The Prosody of Greek Speech, is that in certain contexts some long syllables in Greek had a longer duration than others, and this may have made them unsuitable for the anceps position of the third metron of a trimeter.
