= Tercet =

Poetry composed of three lines

A tercet is composed of three lines of poetry, forming a stanza or a complete poem.

== Examples of tercet forms ==
English-language haiku is an example of an unrhymed tercet poem. A poetic triplet is a tercet in which all three lines follow the same rhyme, $\mathrm{AAA}$; triplets are rather rare; they are more customarily used sparingly in verse of heroic couplets or other couplet verse, to add extraordinary emphasis.

Other types of tercet include an enclosed tercet where the lines rhyme in an $\mathrm{ABA}$ pattern and terza rima where the $\mathrm{ABA}$ pattern of a verse is continued in the next verse by making the outer lines of the next stanza rhyme with the central line of the preceding stanza, $\mathrm{BCB}$, as in the terza rima or terzina form of Dante Alighieri's Divine Comedy. There has been much investigation of the possible sources of the Dantesque terzina, which Benedetto Croce characterised as "linked, enclosed, disciplined, vehement and yet calm". William Baer observes of the tercets of terza rima, "These interlocking rhymes tend to pull the listener's attention forward in a continuous flow.... Given this natural tendency to glide forward, terza rima is especially well-suited to narration and description".

The tercet also forms part of the villanelle, where the initial five stanzas are tercets, followed by a concluding quatrain.

A tercet may also form the separate halves of the ending sestet in a Petrarchan sonnet, where the rhyme scheme is $\mathrm{ABBAABBACDCCDC}$, as in Longfellow's "Cross of Snow". For example, while "Cross of Snow" is indeed a Petrarchan sonnet, it does not follow the form of$\mathrm{ABBA. ABBA \,\, CDC,CDC}$. Instead, its form is $\mathrm{ABBA \,\, CDDC \,\, EFG \,\, EFG}$. A tercet also ends sestinas where the keywords of the lines before are repeated in a highly ordered form.

== History ==
Tercets (or tristichs) using parallelism appear in Biblical Hebrew poetry.

The tercet was introduced into English poetry by Sir Thomas Wyatt in the 16th century. It was employed by Shelley and is the form used in Byron's The Prophecy of Dante.

== See also ==
- Triadic-line poetry
- Trimeter
- Haiku
- Haiku in English
