= Tamil prosody =

Tamil prosody defines several metres in six basic elements covering the various aspects of rhythm. Most classical works and many modern works are written in these metres.

Tolkappiyam represents the older tradition in Tamil prosody while yapparungalam and yapparungalakkarigai represent the later tradition. The prosodic structure of literary works from the Sangam era has to be analysed according to the Tolkappiyam. The rules given in Yapparungalakkarigai are used in the scansion of later works.

== Development ==
The development of Tamil prosody can be broadly broken into four stages. The first stage is predominantly indigenous, pre-Sanskritic and extra-Sanskritic. It is based on a basic metrical unit named acai which forms the basis for all the important classical metres of Tamil. The second stage (c. 600 CE) marks the influence of Sanskritic prosody on the Tamil metre and ends with the overwhelming incorporation of the akshara (syllable) and matra (mora) based metrics alongside the indigenous Tamil ones.

The third stage is marked by the gradual coming together of poetry and music starting with the use of fixed melody types (paṇ) in Shaiva and Vaishnava Bhakti texts. The stage culminates with the spread of musical forms in the 17th, 18th, and early 19th-century. The final stage appears with the introduction of free verse and prose-poetry in the early 20th century.

== Basic elements ==
The basic prosodic unit is the asai (acai) which is composed of ezhuttu (eḻuttu), the letters of the Tamil language or more accurately, the speech sounds in Tamil. Asais are the components of the metrical foot or cīr which, in turn, are the components of the adi (aṭi), a line of poetry. Other elements include todai (toṭai, alliteration) and vannam (vaṇṇam, "rhythmic effect", lit. colour or beauty).

== Metres ==
- Venpa
- Aciriyappa
- Kalippa
- vanjippa

== See also ==
- Sanskrit prosody
