= Trimeter =

Type of meter (poetry)

In poetry, a trimeter (Greek for "three measure") is a metre of three metrical feet per line. Examples:

When here // the spring // we see,
Fresh green // upon // the tree.

== See also ==
- Anapaest
- Dactyl
- Tristich
- Triadic-line poetry
