= Wilhelm Ténint =

Wilhelm Ténint (20 May 1817, Paris – 26 April 1879, Stockholm) was a minor French Romantic writer.

He was a fervent admirer of Victor Hugo and of the "modern school" of Romantic literature. He published in Parisian literary journals such as La Presse, and was a member of the Société des gens de lettres. In 1844, he published a handbook for and defense of Romantic prosody titled Prosodie de l'école moderne, which had a brief introduction by Hugo and a longer introduction by Emile Deschamps. Ténint's handbook mistakenly claimed that the unique, nonce structure of Jean Passerat's 1574 "Villanelle" was an old French form akin to terza rima; the poet Théodore de Banville subsequently "revived" this "Renaissance form," thus helping to create the modern 19-line poetic form called the villanelle. Ténint was placed under house arrest for pederasty in 1851 and thereafter left France for Sweden, where he translated Swedish works into French.
