= Far field (disambiguation) =

Far field is the radiative component of an object's electromagnetic field.

Far field or The Far Field may also refer to:

- Far-field acoustic levitation, a method of acoustic levitation
- Far-field pattern, the directional dependence of radio waves' strength
- The Far Field (album), a 2017 album by Future Islands
- The Far Field (poem), a 1964 poetry collection by Theodore Roethke, and its title poem

== See also ==
- Farfield, a boarding house at Gresham's School
- Farfield Friends Meeting House in Yorkshire
