= The Art of Losing (The Anchoress album) =

Album by The Anchoress

Studio album by The Anchoress
- Released: 12 March 2021
- Genre: Alt-pop
- Length: 53:02
- Label: Kscope
- Producer: Catherine Anne Davies

The Anchoress chronology
Confessions of a Romance Novelist (2016)	The Art of Losing (2021)

Singles from The Art of Losing
- 1. "Show Your Face" Released: 3 November 2020; 2. "Unravel" Released: 4 December 2020; 3. "The Art of Losing" Released: 22 January 2021

The Art of Losing is the second studio album by Welsh musician The Anchoress. It was released on 12 March 2021 by Kscope. Written and produced by Davies, the record has a dark alt-pop sound. Lyrically, it draws from grief, fury, and Davies's personal experiences. Upon release, the album was met with critical acclaim, with praise towards Davies's storytelling.

== Background and release ==
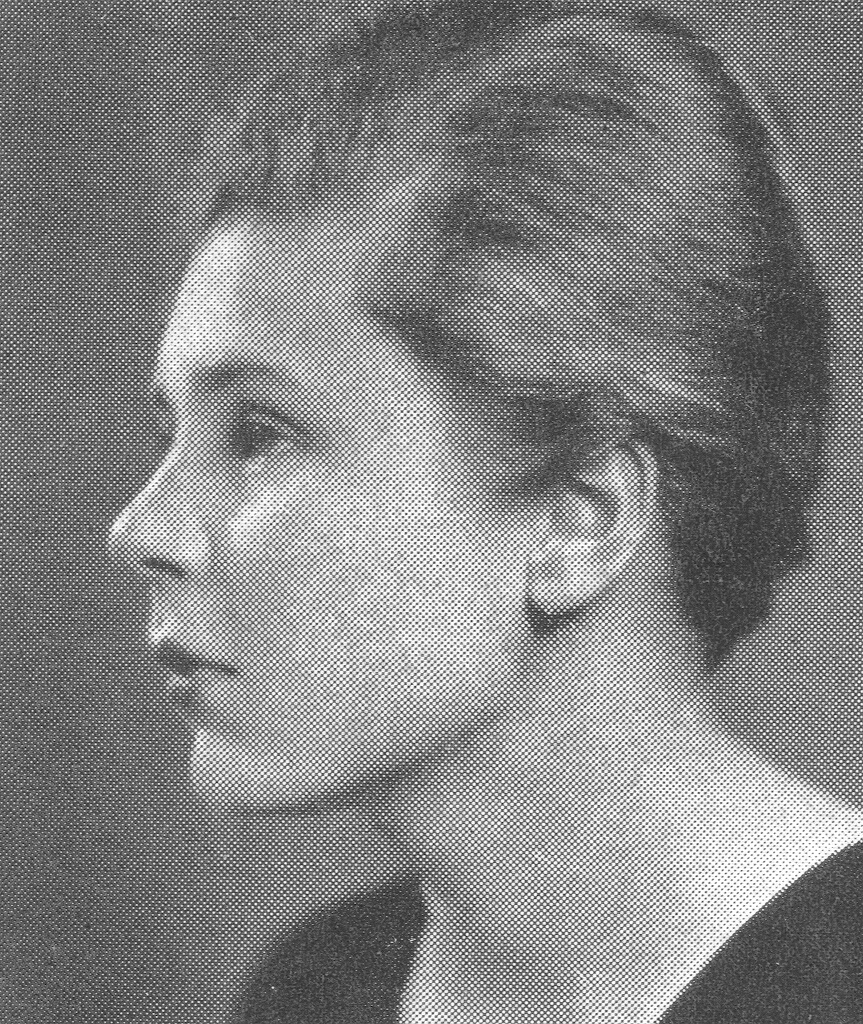
The Art of Losing derives its title from American poet Elizabeth Bishop's (pictured in 1934) poem "One Art".

The Art of Losing follows Davies's 2020 collaboration project In Memory of My Feelings with Bernard Butler, that was written and recorded over 15 days. It also marks her first full-length release since her 2016 debut album, Confessions of a Romance Novelist. According to Davies, The Art of Losing was inspired by the works of musicians, such as Scott Walker, David Bowie, and the Manic Street Preachers. It was written and produced by Davies, and features a guest appearance by frequent collaborator James Dean Bradfield of Manic Street Preachers. The album derives its title from the opening line of American poet Elizabeth Bishop's poem "One Art" (1976) – "The art of losing isn't hard to master". The album incorporates a dark alt-pop production. The production features pianos, cellos, synthesizers, and drums. Lyrically, the concept album is about the "sensation of loss". It explores themes of grief, fury, trauma, and the singer's personal experiences.

[...] There's actually something really joyous about listening to dark records. The challenge, in taking on a subject that naturally lends itself to downtempo, introspective ballads, was forcing myself to do something much more experimental, musically.

— Davies on the sound of the album, NME

The record was announced in November 2020, alongside the cover-art and track list. The fourth track, "Show Your Face", was simultaneously served as the lead single from the album. In the lead-up to the release of the album, "Unravel" was served as the second single on 4 December 2020, while the title track was delivered as the third single on 22 January 2021. The Art of Losing was released on 12 March 2021 by Kscope.

== Critical reception ==
Professional ratings
Aggregate scores
Source	Rating
Metacritic	83/100
Review scores
Source	Rating
Clash	8/10
The Line of Best Fit	9/10
Mojo	4/5 stars
musicOMH	4.5/5 stars
NME	4/5 stars
Uncut	9/10

At Metacritic, which assigns a weighted average rating out of 100 to reviews from mainstream publications, this release received an average score of 83, based on six reviews, indicating "universal acclaim".

Writing for The Line of Best Fit, Steven Loftin dubbed the album as "a collection of songs that each sits within the calloused hand of grief, desperately trying to unfurl its infuriatingly homely fingers with an embittered rage". Reviewing for NME, El Hunt lauded Davies's "raw and unfiltered" lyricism and the production. Hunt described the album as both "painful and familiar" and wrote that it "captures the unpredictable, spinning chaos of grief with a searing precision that's hard to turn away from". Similarly, Josh Gray of Clash praised Davies's "authorial voice and ability" to tell an honest story, as well as the album's sound. musicOMH's Steven Murphy felt the album was "a palpable step up for Davies". In FMS Magazine, Jimi Arundell described the "stoic yet stylish" record as "a true masterpiece which transforms her own tragedies into a universal language of pain". In the March 2021 issue of Record Collector, Kevin Harley described the album as "shining alt-pop from an artisan of darkness", "A literate, bristling record of catharsis and dramatic defiance, driven by loss, suffering and anger."

"The Art of Losing" which was named amongst the "Best Albums of 2021" by numerous publications including the Sunday Times, Prog Magazine, Record Collector, The Line of Best Fit, The Sun, Yorkshire Post, and Classic Rock.

=== Year-end lists ===
The Art of Losing on year-end lists
Publication	List	Rank	Ref.
Prog	Top 20 Albums of 2021	1	
The Sunday Times	The Sunday Times' 25 Best Albums of 2021	16	
Record Collector	Best New Albums of 2021	14	
The Line of Best Fit	Best Albums of 2021	36	
The Yorkshire Post	Albums of the Year	1	

== Track listing ==
All tracks were written and produced by Davies.

The Art of Losing track listing
No.	Title	Length
1.	"Moon Rise (Prelude)"	2:51
2.	"Let It Hurt"	3:37
3.	"The Exchange" (featuring James Dean Bradfield)	4:19
4.	"Show Your Face"	4:27
5.	"The Art of Losing"	4:07
6.	"All Farewells Should Be Sudden"	5:02
7.	"All Shall Be Well"	1:40
8.	"Unravel"	4:05
9.	"Paris"	2:01
10.	"5AM"	4:02
11.	"The Heart Is a Lonesome Hunter"	4:06
12.	"My Confessor"	3:56
13.	"With the Boys"	5:57
14.	"Moon (An End)"	2:52
Total length:		53:02

== Charts ==
Chart performance for The Art of Losing
Chart (2021)	Peak position
Scottish Albums (OCC)	9
UK Albums (OCC)	31
