= One Art =

Villanelle by Elizabeth Bishop

Signature

"One Art" is a poem by American poet Elizabeth Bishop, originally published in The New Yorker in 1976. Later that same year, Bishop included the poem in her book Geography III, which includes other works such as "In the Waiting Room" and "The Moose". It is considered to be one of the best villanelles in the English language, and is compared to the works of W.H. Auden, Dylan Thomas, Theodore Roethke, Sylvia Plath, and more.

The poem shares the title of a collection of Bishop's letters from 1928 to 1979, published as her autobiography in 1994. These letters were exchanged with many influential people in her life, such as her mentor at Vassar, Marianne Moore, and her longtime friend and collaborator Robert Lowell. "One Art" is considered autobiographical by some. The poem was written during a period of separation from her partner, Alice Methfessel, and it was one of her final works; she died three years after it was published in 1979.

Geography III and the poem within was met with positive critical reviews and awards; in 1976 and the years following, she received both the National Book Critics Circle Award and the "Books Abroad"/ Neusdadt International Prize for Literature and was elected into the American Academy of Arts and Letters.

== Background ==
"One Art" recounts all the significant losses that Bishop had faced in her life, dating back to the death of her father when she was eight months old and the subsequent loss of her grieving mother, who was confined permanently in a mental asylum when Bishop was five years old. Her move from Worcester, Massachusetts, to Nova Scotia was the first of many, as her health and upbringing were debated by members across her family. She used an inheritance from her father to travel to Key West, Florida. In 1951, she traveled to Brazil on a traveling fellowship from Bryn Mawr College, where she met Lota de Macedo Soares and remained there with her for nearly seventeen years until Soares committed suicide in 1967.

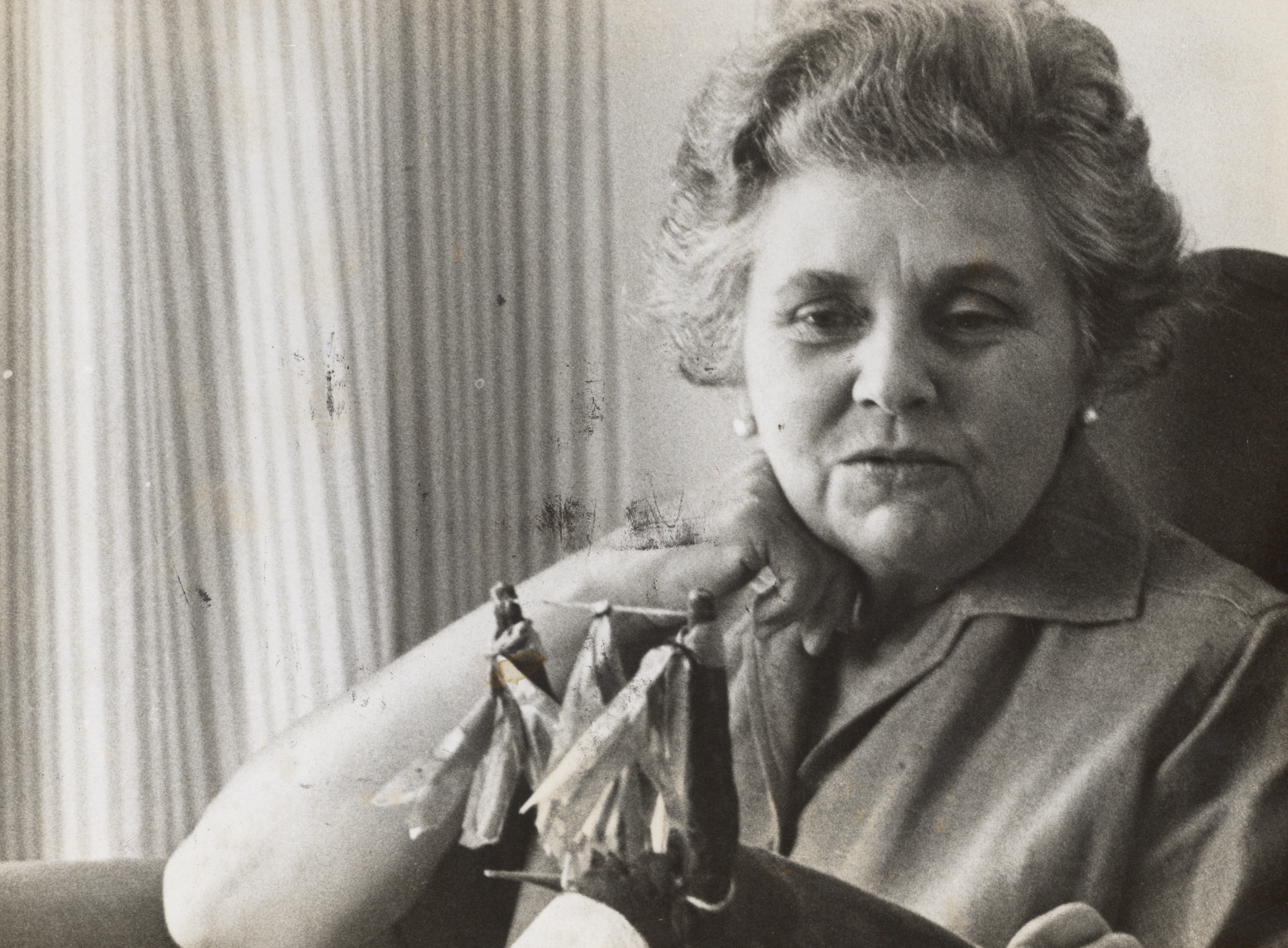
Elizabeth Bishop

In 1970, she accepted Robert Lowell's invitation to take over his teaching position for a few semesters at Harvard University, before her upcoming retirement. Bishop lived on campus in the Kirkland House, where she met the house secretary Alice Methfessel, twenty-seven at the time. Methfessel helped her adjust to her new life, and the two grew close very quickly, developing an intimate relationship.

Bishop's life, and specifically her relationships with these women, was kept under wraps. At one point, Bishop instructed Methfessel to destroy any evidence of their relationship, saying: "I am old-fashioned and believe in discretion and privacy". She would refer to Methfessel as her secretary or friend, and Methfessel was often mistaken for Bishop's caregiver. Now in her sixties, Bishop's asthma had worsened and was paired with dysentery which weakened her immune system; teeth problems requiring many procedures and rheumatism made it painful and more difficult for her to walk or type. She wanted to keep up with her companion who was more than thirty years younger, and so began abusing Nembutal to sleep and Dexamyl to suppress her appetite and stabilize her mood. Methfessel not only oversaw her medications but helped keep Bishop organized and active in her daily activities and her career.

Bishop and Methfessel traveled the globe together, and their relationship thrived for five years until Bishop's behaviors and alcoholism drove a wedge between them. In the spring of 1975, Methfessel had met someone else and was engaged to be married. However, the two did not cease corresponding. Methfessel was written into Bishop's will to inherit almost all of her wealth and property and was instructed to carry out an assisted suicide should Bishop's health deteriorate to a certain point.

In October 1975, Bishop began writing "One Art." Her first draft, "How to Lose Things," "The Gift of Losing Things," and "The Art of Losing Things" was a prose-heavy confessional depicting what she had lost and how it could be a lesson. The final draft "One Art" is a much more distanced and structured chronicle of the losses in her life which have taught her a lesson, and a very present loss she is facing and learning from. In the following year, the final version, structured as a villanelle, was published (in the April 26, 1976, issue of The New Yorker), as was her book, Geography III, which was years in the making and satisfied the elegy she always intended to write.

In the years to come, Bishop would find Methfessel again and spend her remaining years in her company until a brain aneurysm in 1979 that resulted in her death.

== Writing ==
Bishop wrote seventeen drafts of the poem, with titles including "How to Lose Things," "The Gift of Losing Things," and "The Art of Losing Things". By the fifteenth draft, Bishop had chosen "One Art" as her title. The poem was written over the course of two weeks, an unusually short time for Bishop. Some of the piece is adapted from a longer poem, Elegy, that Bishop never completed or published.

=== Drafts ===
The poem changed in specific ways from the first to the final draft. Bishop's career was different from many of her colleagues, such as Robert Lowell, because she hated confessional poetry. "Besides they seldom have anything interesting to 'confess' anyway. Mostly they write about a lot of things which I should think were best left unsaid." Keeping to her word, Bishop heavily revised the journal entry of a first draft to remove her voice and anything specific that would give her away. For example, "exceptionally / beautiful or dazzlingly intelligent person / (except for blue eyes)," changes to "(the joking voice, a gesture I love)," giving Bishop the distance she aimed for. When it was published in The New Yorker its poetry editor Howard Moss, responded that "One Art" was, "...upsetting and sad" and that Bishop had established, "...just the right amount of distance".

Scholars have noted many features about the intentions behind the poem by analyzing the changing features in each consecutive draft, often using this analysis in their interpretation of the final poem from its drafts. In a conversation with film editor Walter Murch, Michael Ondaatje compared the creative writing process of "One Art", "In literature, even in something as intimate as a poem, those early drafts can be just as wayward and haphazard as the early stages of a film. Look at the gulf between the untidy, seemingly almost useless, the first draft of Elizabeth Bishop's 'One Art' and the remarkably tight and suggestive final version of her nineteen-line villanelle". Like editing a film, Bishop laid out a sequence of her thoughts and emotions and then came back and organized it into a villanelle like putting together a puzzle. In each draft to follow, she would get closer to reaching that form, with the structure, rhymes, and refrains as her edge pieces. After grappling with several drafts of this poem, Bishop said that this perfect villanelle finally just came to her. "I couldn't believe it -- it was like writing a letter." Bishop made sure to include "One Art" in her book, Geography III, which she had been working on for some years.

== Content ==
Bishop's life was marked by loss and instability, which is reflected in many of the poems of Geography III. "One Art" is narrated by a speaker who details losing small items, which gradually become more significant, moving from the misplacement of "door keys" to the loss of "two cities" where the speaker presumably lived, for example.

The first stanza provides the poem's thesis; we are all going to lose things and get much better at it as we do. Find the silver lining in that, it is not a disaster. The word "intent" gives agency to powers that be, and the "so many things" which are going to be lost.

The second stanza sums it up with the "practice makes perfect" theme, giving examples of every day, lifelong, broad, and shallow losses. These examples communicate that not only does everyone lose things, but everyone loses things all the time.

The third stanza begins the chronicle of Elizabeth's losses in life, spiraling "farther" and "faster" towards the final stanza. "Places, and names, and where it was you meant to travel" represent the theme of regret in this poem.

The fourth stanza is a unique moment for Bishop, where she uses "my" and speaks of specific and personal experiences that have taught her a lesson. The mother she speaks of here was estranged to Bishop at age five when she was permanently institutionalized, this "watch" may simply represent a keepsake she held which meant nothing to her, as she did not feel a strong connection with her mother. She was meant to write a critical response to Sylvia Plath's letters to her mother in 1975 but being unable to relate to the mother-daughter relationship Plath expresses, Bishop did not go further with her criticism of these, which she felt were superficial. The houses she has lost are from her childhood from moving around a lot and her relationship with Methfessel; the two were connected by their travels and the time they spent living together in paradises. Specifying her "next-to-last" house to indicate that her life is not over yet, this is significant because of her mental health and suicidal tendencies at this point in her life.

The fifth stanza, and final tercet, relates back to the strong themes of traveling from her book, Geography III. A difference between the houses in the previous stanza, these cities, realms, rivers, and continents are a grander, "vaster" spectacle of her loss. Scholars have discovered the exact locations she is speaking of here. They are across the globe and in periods of her life of traveling, but emphasize the period when she lived in Brazil with her longtime love Lota de Macedo Soares, an heiress of a great estate, a "realm" in Brazil. "She had lost the three houses of 'One Art' in Key West, Petrópolis, and Ouro Preto, she told David McCullough."

The final quatrain is the final mention of the subject of Bishop's present loss, and reveals that the purpose of writing the poem is personal healing and growth. Mentioned in the Writing section of this article, Bishop kept a balance between distancing herself from a poem written about her life, and the "joke voice" mentioned here is the sole physical trait of reference to Bishop's lost partner. The parentheses and slight description give an insight into what Bishop is thinking about while writing the poem. This is a crucial element of the stanza because of the next parenthetical pause which again expresses that "the art of losing's not too hard to master" (a moment when the refrain deviates from "the art of losing isn't hard to master"), Bishop interrupts the line to remind herself to "(Write it!)" and remind herself of the message which she is preaching.

== Form ==
The poem is a villanelle, an originally French poetic form known for generally dealing with pastoral themes. Bishop is a known formalist in her poems, following the rules of a structure closely; though the final stanza ironically breaks from the format, and our expectations, using parenthesis, italics, an em-dash, and a deviation in the wording of the refrain. Brad Leithauser wrote of the poem that, in addition to "Do not go gentle into that good night" by Dylan Thomas, that it "...might have taken the elaborate stanzaic arrangement even if the Italians hadn't invented it three hundred years ago."

The ABA rhyme scheme "One Art" alternates between the "-er" and "-ent" ending sound, with the last stanza repeating the A sound, as is with the villanelle. The refrains, "The art of losing isn't hard to master", which varies in the eighteenth line, "the art of losing's not too hard to master". The villanelle has no set meter, but Bishop keeps a pattern of alternating eleven and ten-syllable lines, with predominantly iambic pentameter.

In an interview with Elizabeth Spires in 1978, Bishop said that her thoughts when writing "One Art" were always on villanelles. "I wanted to write a villanelle all my life but I never could. I'd start them but for some reason, I never could finish them." You can see this intent when examining the original drafts where one can make out the skeleton of a villanelle; she chose her rhymes and refrains first and filled in the rest Brett Millier has assessed that "Bishop conceived the poem as a villanelle from the start, and the play of "twos" within it - two rivers, two cities, the lost lover means not being "two" anymore - suggests that a two-rhyme villanelle is a form appropriate to the content."

=== Themes ===
Bishop instills one main theme in this poem, loss, which has consequences that form branching themes of learning, regret, travel, and symbolism.

==== Loss ====
Nearly explicitly stated, Bishop writes to explore the theme of loss as she reflects on her losses. Using the villanelle form, Bishop emphasizes the inevitability of loss when she sets up a rigid structure, and then repeatedly breaks it, adding hyper-beats or eliding syllables, using half-rhymes, and an altered final refrain, to name a few. Loss is felt in this poem through Bishop's vague, but not so vague, examples of things everyone loses or can love; loss becomes a moment in the grander commentary on human existence which art pursues. This concept draws back to the title, loss is an art and the art of losing is learned through loss, engrained in everyday life and present in the most important moments of our lives. This is exactly the progression that the poem follows, and it acts as a philosophical theory of life and loss, drawing examples from her life.

==== Learning ====
What satisfies and consoles Bishop in this process of writing, as well as losing, is that she is learning and enhancing a skill, the skill of loss. It is just as the saying goes, "practice makes perfect". This theme is almost an antithesis of the theme of regret, and is the main take away from this lesson on lessons of loss. The objectivity in the phrase, "The art of losing isn't hard to master", lends itself to the lesson Bishop is trying to convey; if a teacher used language that indicated bias, their entire lesson becomes compromised. The intricacies of teaching and learning are felt as deeply as loss, and Bishop's poem frames each of them as an art, the art of losing, and learning to lose.

==== Regret ====
Regret, more than remorse, is the general attitude and tone of this poem as Bishop recounts, or reminisces about her losses. Regret is naturally an antagonist to learning and growing from experiences of failure, and it behaves similarly to the experiences Bishop mentions here. The line "I miss them, but it wasn't a disaster," speaks strongly to this theme.

==== Travel ====
Traveling was a staple of importance to Bishop, and it inspired much of her writing before "One Art". Therefore, she promotes traveling in "One Art", even though it is a source of loss. She uses traveling as a theme here to promote a sense of carpe diem, seize the day, which relates back to repeated notions that everything is bound, or intended, to be lost that one should not shy away from anything for fear of losing it; losing it is not a disaster.

== Reception ==
The poem was well received at the time of its publication by peers and fellow poets. In the next few years, Bishop would be awarded the Books Abroad / Neustadt International Prize in 1976, National Book Critics Circle Award in 1977, was elected into the American Academy of Arts and Letters in 1976 for her past works and specifically her book, Geography III].

Brett Miller wrote that "One Art" "may be the best modern example of a villanelle..." along with Theodore Roethke's "The Waking".
