= Terzanelle =

Poetic form

A terzanelle is a poetic form combining aspects of the villanelle and the terza rima. It is nineteen lines total, with five triplets and a concluding quatrain. The middle line of each triplet stanza is repeated as the third line of the following stanza, and the first and third lines of the initial stanza are the second and final lines of the concluding quatrain; thus, seven of the lines are repeated in the poem. The rhyme scheme and stanzaic structure are as follows (a capitalized letter indicates a line repeated verbatim):

A^{1}BA^{2}
bCB
cDC
dED
eFE
fA^{1}FA^{2}

Or, for the alternate (couplet) ending, the final stanza is:

fFA^{1}A^{2}

== Notable examples ==
- Terzanelle in Thunderweather by Lewis Turco, with a further explanation of the form
