= François Passerat =

French poet, playwright and actor

François Passerat was a 17th-century French poet, playwright and actor.

== Biography ==
François Passerat (who was not related to the famous sixteenth century poet Jean Passerat) was the son of an actress named Buisson (or Dubuisson) and played in the Duke of Hanover's troupe from 1684, troupe of which he was also the secretary. On the death of Frederick William, he dedicated him a praise and continued his career under the protection of Ernest-Augustus of Hanover, as secretary of his wife Sophia of Hanover. The latter advised him to send his tragedy Sabinus her niece Élisabeth Charlotte, a step-sister of Louis XIV. This is probably what earned Passerat the possibility to play before the king in September 1692.

He may have been a member of the Comédie-Française before joining the elector of Bavaria's troupe in Brussels. In 1695, he dedicated him a collection of theatre plays, ballets and pieces in verse.

At the end of the century, he seems to have returned to Hanover.

== Works ==
- 1688: Tombeau du grand Frédéric-Guillaume, électeur de Brandebourg, décédé le 29 avril 1688, Hannoveræ, typis G. F. Grimmii, s.d.
- 1695: Œuvres de Monsieur Passerat, dédiées à son Altesse Électorale de Bavière, Brussels, George de Backer. Ce recueil contient les pièces suivantes, en pagination séparée : Sabinus, tragédie - L'Heureux Accident, ou la Maison de campagne, comédie - Le Feint Campagnard, comédie - Amarillis, petite pastorale - Le Grand Ballet d'Alcide et d'Hébé - Le Bel Anglois, nouvelle galante - Recueil de poésies diverses sur différents sujets.
- Œuvres de Monsieur Passerat, dédiées à son Altesse Électorale de Bavière, seconde édition, revue et corrigée, La Haye, Henry Van Bulderen, 1695. Contient les mêmes pièces.
- 1697: À Monsieur le Comte..., Hanover.
