= Gerard'd du Toit =

Gérard’d du Toit is an International figure in the Choral world who has drawn attention when he conducted the Drakensberg Boys’ choir in Europe in 1988, Namibia and South Africa from 1985 to 1989. His involvement with the Drakensberg Boys Choir school led to his post-graduate studies at the University of Pretoria specialising in choral conducting and writing a thesis on the formal training of the boys voice when mutating. It his energetic and spirited leadership with the KwaZulu-Natal Youth Choir and the University of UKZN Bel Canto Chamber Choir from 1996 that led to examining and adjudicating in Europe such as Estonia (2004, 2007); presenting a week-long choral course on South African Choral music in Ljubljana (Slovenia) under the auspices of the Ljubljana Madrigalisti (2005), acting as the SA partner of the Choir World Games in Xiamen, China (2006), and on the jury at the prestigious Cecilia Seghizzi International Choir Competition (Gorizia, Italy 2010).

His interest in Folk Song encouraged him to investigate the song festival phenomena in Estonia. He has an instinctive appreciation for Folklore around the world specifically from the Baltic States, Italy, Czech Republic, Slovakia, Slovenia, Germany, Austria, Greece, Russia, Bulgaria, Belgium, The Netherlands, France, Japan, China, The Philippines and the USA.

As International clinician Gérard’d lectured Conductors on How to prepare a choir for International competition, Stylistic interpretation of Choral Works, and Conducting techniques from beginner to advanced conducting techniques. Gérard’d conducted the SA National Youth Choir in 1997 and attended Advanced Masterclasses in Conducting (Marktoberdorf 2001) by Prof Volker Hempfling, Jonathan Velasco and Branko Stark (2006) and Robert Sund, Sweden, (1997, 2002, 2006). Awards include: Outstanding Choral Conductor by the South African Choral Society in 2005 and conductor maestro at the International Antonio Vivaldi Choir Competition in Karpenissi, Greece 2011. In July 2013 the KZN Youth Choir travelled to Florence, Italy to compete in the Florence International Choir Festival where 18 other choirs from around the world took part. This festival was aimed at professional choirs, so they were extremely honoured to be chosen to take part. They were awarded the following prizes: Gold in the Chamber Choir Category, Gold for Best Female Soloist (Pearl Khwezi) and Gold for Best Contemporary Arrangement (Gerard’d du Toit for “Sounds of Africa”), Silver in the Sacred Music Category, Fourth in the Popular, Folk and Gospel Category as well as Fourth in the Youth Choir Category.

Following the KZN Youth Choir's success in the Bydgoszcz Musical Impressions competition & festival in Poland in 2015, Gerard'd was invited to be a member of the jury at the 2016 International BIM Music Festival & Competition in Poland.

Gérard’d du Toit believes that the KZN Youth choir only benefits when working in collaboration with a composer. He is an admirer of the work of Prof Hendrik Hofmeyer (UCT), and the choir has performed works with the permission of the composer. Other composers include Jüri-Ruut Kangur (Estonia) and the South African born composer, Enrico Gerber who lives in the UK.

== History ==
Gérard'd du Toit was born in Nelspruit and started his formal music training at the age of 11. He matriculated at Hoërskool Nelspruit in 1975 and enrolled for a B.Mus Performance degree at the University of Pretoria. His studies included organ and formal voice training. In 1987 he completed the Teachers Licentiate in flute at UNISA. In 1992 he completed the B.Mus Honours Degree at the University of Pretoria, majoring in a thesis on the formal training of the boy's voice while it is changing He is a member and soloist of the UNISA Ad Libitum Choir. In 1986, Gérard'd was appointed Choirmaster of the world famous Drakensberg Boys' Choir School. He was appointed by the Board of Directors to accompany the choir on its 21st Birthday tour to Europe, as Conductor. In 1990 Gérard'd was appointed as a staff member at Hoërskool Ermelo where he founded the Hoëveld Children's Choir. The choir became the Panasonic Highveld and Youth Choir with a reputation for excellence. He was appointed the Head of the Music and Ballet Departments in 1994 and received a gold medal from the Director of Education for outstanding work in the choral field. In 1993 he started the National Werner Nel Song and Art Festival in Ermelo.

In 1994 Gérard'd toured with the Panasonic Highveld and Youth Choir in Egypt and Israel. The choir was the first to perform in the Cairo Opera House. In 1995 Gérard'd toured Egypt, Israel, England and Europe to investigate the possibility of an international Choir Competition in South Africa.

In 1996 Gérard'd was appointed Chapel Choirmaster at Michaelhouse, an independent Boys' School in Kwazulu-Natal, where he held the position of Director of Music.

In August 1996 he was appointed Artistic Director of the Kwazulu-Natal Youth Choir. In 2001 Gérard'd attended the International Chamber Choir Competition Marktoberdorf as well as the advanced Choirmasters Seminar. He was one of seven conductors who conducted in the final closing concert, conducting the Portland State University Choir of the United States. In 2002 Gérard'd attended the "Isola Del Sole" Choir Competition in Grado, Italy, and had private Conducting Master Classes under the guidance of the world famous Robert Sund, conductor of the "Orphei Dranger" Men's Choir in Sweden. In July 2002 Gérard'd had Vocal Master Classes in Moscow, Russia, under the guidance of Professor Victor Emeljanov. In September Gerard'd was one of the clinicians at the sought-after Philip MacLachlan Choir Seminar which was held in Bloemfontein.

Gérard'd was invited in 2003 to give Vocal Master classes in Estonia, to attend the 8th International Chamber Choir Competition Marktoberdorf and the Choirmasters' Seminar based on his results in 2001 to attend the Tampere Festival in Finland and to participate in the first Eric Ericsson Conductors Competition in Sweden. Gérard'd visited Estonia in December 2004 where he attended and worked with various choirs in Tallinn. He also sat in on the Winter Exams for young Choral Conductors at the Specialised Music School in Tallinn. In July 2005 he gave Master Classes in Slovenia, with the resident choir the Ljubljana Madrigalist under the baton of Andreja Martinjak. Gérard'd was awarded "Outstanding Conductor of the Year" by the South African Choral Society on 15 October 2005. He has been appointed by Interkultur Foundation, Musica-Mundi, as the South African Partner for the 4th World Choir Games which took place in Xiamen, China in July 2006.

Since January 2007 Gérard'd has been appointed as "Head of the Music Department" at the Deutsche Schule Hermannsburg, in the Natal Midlands.

Gérard'd has been invited to examine, in December 2008, in The Baltic States; sitting in on the winter exams for young Choral Conductors and to visit music schools in Berlin, Germany to assess the development of Subject Music in Germany. In 2010 Gérard'd was invited to adjudicate at the Cecilia Seghizzi International Choir Competition in Gorizia, Italy.

== Career ==
- Hoërskool Randburg Choir Conductor and Teacher
- 1986 - 1990: Drakensberg Boys' Choir School
- Panasonic Highveld Youth Choir Conductor
- 1996 - 2004: Michaelhouse Director of Music
- 1996-2021: KwaZulu-Natal Youth Choir Artistic Director
- 2005–2014: Deutsche Schule Hermannsburg Director of Music
- 2015–2021:Clifton College Director of Music
- 2022-present: Deutsche Schule Hermannsburg Director of Music & Culture
