= Will Happiness Find Me? =

2012 studio album by Maria Minerva

Studio album by Maria Minerva
- Released: September 4, 2012
- Genre: synth-pop; lo-fi music
- Length: 44:24
- Label: Not Not Fun

Maria Minerva chronology
Cabaret Cixous (2011)	Will Happiness Find Me? (2012)	Histrionic (2014)

Will Happiness Find Me? is the third (Note: Some instead count Will Happiness Find Me? as Minerva's second full-length album. (This depends on whether the cassette album Tallinn at Dawn is counted as an album.) Maria Minerva has considered it her second album (considering the cassette-only album Tallinn at Dawn a "tape").) album by Estonian musician Maria Minerva, released on September 4, 2012, by Not Not Fun. Minerva called it a "psychedelic pop record". It received generally favorable reviews from critics.

== Background, release, and promotion ==
Maria Minerva released multiple records in 2011, including two albums, Tallinn at Dawn and Cabaret Cixous on Not Not Fun, and the Sacred & Profane Love EP on its 100% Silk imprint. She spent the winter of 2011 in Lisbon, taking a break from her master's course in London. Describing her state of mind in that period, she said: "I became kinda critical of my own success, everything just seemed like a bunch of bullshit at that point". In Lisbon, she wrote and recorded her third album, saying later that she wanted to "mess about a little", and describing the result as "a rather funny, psychedelic pop record". However, it was her first album to be recorded in a studio (Barber Shop Gallery, Lisbon).

Near the time of the album's release, Minerva was procrastinating on her master's thesis on glossolalia, vocal music, and Luciano Berio; and she was "listening to rap music all the time". The album was released on September 4, 2012, by Not Not Fun. In support of the album, she launched a European tour, which she began in Estonia with a January 25, 2013, performance at the Telliskivi Creative City in Tallinn; she was based in New York City at the time.

== Music and themes ==
Will Happiness Find Me? was more beat-driven than Minerva's earlier work; Josh Becker of Beats Per Minute wrote that it was "the first Maria Minerva album that I feel like a DJ could reasonably play at a dance club", with her vocals now given "a much stronger rhythmic backing". According to Eric Hill of Exclaim!, the album "takes a few steps closer to the blurry line that separates quirky, home-taped experiments and straight-up club cuts". Tiny Mix Tapes heard the record as "subtler and more mature than the artist's earlier work", drawing on a 1980s and 1990s revival with "hints of New Jack Swing" (a late 1980s-to-early 1990s fusion genre involving contemporary R&B), while Eesti Ekspress framed it as a move toward pop. Consequence of Sound also noted the presence of a pop sensibility, albeit intertwined with "deeply pained electronics". Writing for Postimees, Risto Kozer heard fewer 1990s rave elements and more 1970s avant-folk reminiscent of Dennis Wilson's Pacific Ocean Blue, and noted the influence of the London producer Actress on "Coming of Age".

Opener "The Sound" moves into "sped-up trip-hop 808s" and handclaps, and incorporates looping chanting associated with Maharishi Mahesh Yogi. "Sweet Synergy" contains R&B vocal influences and relies on horn stabs. "Fire" features a guest rap verse. "Mad Girl's Love Song" takes its title from Sylvia Plath's poem and opens with a repeated voice sample about Star Wars. The closing track, "The Star", samples the Chordettes' "Mr. Sandman". The album's title is taken from a line in the track "I Don't Wanna Be Discovered".

According to Resident Advisor, the album sets aside the "lyrical slyness" of Minerva's earlier records to settle on "a vision of desire and romance that's a highly enjoyable, unrelenting bummer". Among the album's lyrical and conceptual themes are loneliness, social alienation, and rejection of mainstream success.

== Critical reception ==
Professional ratings
Aggregate scores
Source	Rating
Metacritic	77/100
Review scores
Source	Rating
Beats Per Minute	73/100
Consequence	C+
Pitchfork	6.9/10
Postimees	5/5

Will Happiness Find Me? received generally favorable reviews. The Wire called it "a cunning, witty album", and Resident Advisor called it "as fantastically compelling musically as it is thought-provoking". Tiny Mix Tapes praised the way "the lo-fi complexities, interactions, and repetitions create a revelation".

Other critics were more measured. In her review for Pitchfork, Lindsay Zoladz wrote that Minerva's music "remains an acquired taste" and that the album "is not a record to convert people who've been put off by her stuff in the past", while allowing that it was "noticeably clearer in its vision than anything she's put out before". She opined that Minerva's adherence to an anti-commercial aesthetic might ultimately limit her artistic potential. Fact called it an "odd journey that, while not always successful or fully-formed, should not be judged for it" and "a fitful, thought-provoking listen", and Sarah H. Grant of Consequence of Sound gave the album a C+, finding it thematically layered but emotionally bleak.

== Track listing ==
No.	Title	Length
1.	"The Sound"	3:53
2.	"Heart Like a Microphone"	3:50
3.	"I Don't Wanna Be Discovered (Will Happiness Find Me?)"	3:48
4.	"Alone in Amsterdam"	3:36
5.	"Sweet Synergy"	3:40
6.	"Fire" (featuring Chase Royal)	3:01
7.	"Coming of Age"	4:42
8.	"Perpetual Motion Machine"	3:37
9.	"Never Give Up"	6:49
10.	"Mad Girl's Love Song"	4:50
11.	"The Star"	2:38
Total length:		44:24
