= If I Could Tell You (poem) =

Poem by W. H. Auden

"If I Could Tell You" is a poem by W. H. Auden. Written in 1940, it is in villanelle form and is one of the best-known examples of this form.

== Form ==
The poem is written in the villanelle or villanesque form of poetry, which contains nineteen lines. These lines consist of five tercets followed by a quatrain. Two lines of the opening tercet, the first and the third, are known as refrains and are repeated alternately throughout the poem as the final lines of the following tercets. In this poem, the refrains are the lines "Time will say nothing but I told you so" and "If I could tell you I would let you know", with a subtle variation on the first refrain in the final quatrain. Villanelle poems have a rhyme scheme of ABA ABA ABA ABA ABA ABAA using only two different sounds, with the A sound including both refrains and the first line of intermediate verses, and the B sound being the second line of each verse.
