= Charles Krafft =

American ceramicist and painter (1947–2020)

Charles Wing Krafft (September 19, 1947 – June 12, 2020) was an American painter and ceramicist whose later work incorporated traditional ceramic decorative styles to produce works commemorating modern disasters. In 1998, he was called "the dark angel of Seattle art" by the art critic of the Seattle Post-Intelligencer. In early 2013 it was revealed that he participated in white nationalist and Holocaust denial websites, which led to a re-evaluation of his artwork.

== Early life ==
Charles Krafft was born in Seattle in 1947, and grew up near the Seattle Art Museum, which he frequented, leading to his initial interest in art. In his teenage years, he became interested in the writings of Jack Kerouac and the artwork of Von Dutch, a prominent custom car designer, gunsmith and explosives specialist. He later became fascinated by the art of Morris Graves and the Northwest School. He has named Von Dutch and Graves as his "greatest inspirations". He also spent time with Guy Anderson, also of the Northwest School. He soon moved into a cabin in an artists' commune in Fishtown, near La Conner, Washington, where he lived for 12 years. Initially he went there to attempt to learn to meditate. Although this failed, he first began painting there.

== Career ==
Eventually returning to Seattle, Krafft continued painting until 1991, when he took a class in china painting. From then he worked exclusively in ceramics. Seeing the existing designs in ceramics as outdated, he sought to produce designs that would commemorate disastrous events, hence the term Disasterware describes his work. Subjects for his ceramics have included the sinking of the SS Andrea Doria, Hindu deities, historical murders, and the explosion of the Hindenburg, among many others. Krafft's first plates were exhibited at the Davidson Galleries in 1991, and were immediately purchased by collectors. Subsequently, Krafft also began making embroidered ceramic replicas of guns.

Since 1991, Krafft's work has been exhibited in galleries throughout the United States and Europe, and has been published in magazines including Harper's, Artforum, and The New Yorker. In 1995, Krafft received a grant jointly from the National Endowment for the Arts, the Citizens Exchange Council, and the Soros Foundation to accompany the Slovenian band Laibach and its associated arts collective, Neue Slowenische Kunst, on their "Occupied Europe: NATO" tour in Yugoslavia, where the Bosnian War was just ending. He was appointed the tour's official photographer, and was present for their historic concert in Sarajevo in December 1995, when the city was still under siege by the Serbs. This experience had a profound effect on Krafft. Krafft has continued to collaborate with Laibach and NSK, and he has contributed to the Porcelain War Museum project in Slovenia.

In 1999, Krafft served a residency at the Kohler Company, during which he developed a technique utilizing bone in ceramics which he termed Spone, after the English potter Josiah Spode, who was the inventor of bone china. Spode's technique, however, involved cow bone; Krafft instead substituted human bone, which he had obtained from the wife of a deceased friend who had requested him to make something out of the remains. Since then, Krafft has manufactured a number of funerary memorial porcelain artworks crafted from human cremains.

In Charles Krafft's Villa Delirium, a book dedicated to his work, Krafft claims that he "prefers to be in the company of criminals, undertakers and blue-haired grannies".

=== White nationalism revelations ===
In February 2013, an article was published in the alternative newsweekly The Stranger which detailed Krafft's participation on white nationalist Web sites, and his Holocaust denial. This led to a great deal of controversy in the art world, in which Krafft's occasional use of the swastika, and imagery related to the Second World War, had always been perceived as "darkly ironic". Some, such as Adam Parfrey of Feral House, came to his defense, while The Globe and Mail in Toronto claimed that Krafft's personal beliefs should not be allowed to affect perceptions of his art. In March 2013 a piece in The New Yorker analyzed the development of Krafft's views and speculated about their relationship to his art. In 2015 Charles Krafft created a ceramic bust of the horror/science fiction writer H. P. Lovecraft. The bust of Lovecraft looks similar to Krafft's earlier busts of Adolf Hitler (as a teapot) and Charles Manson.

== Death ==
Krafft was diagnosed with glioblastoma brain cancer in 2018. He died of his illness on June 12, 2020.
