= Maria Minerva =

Estonian musician

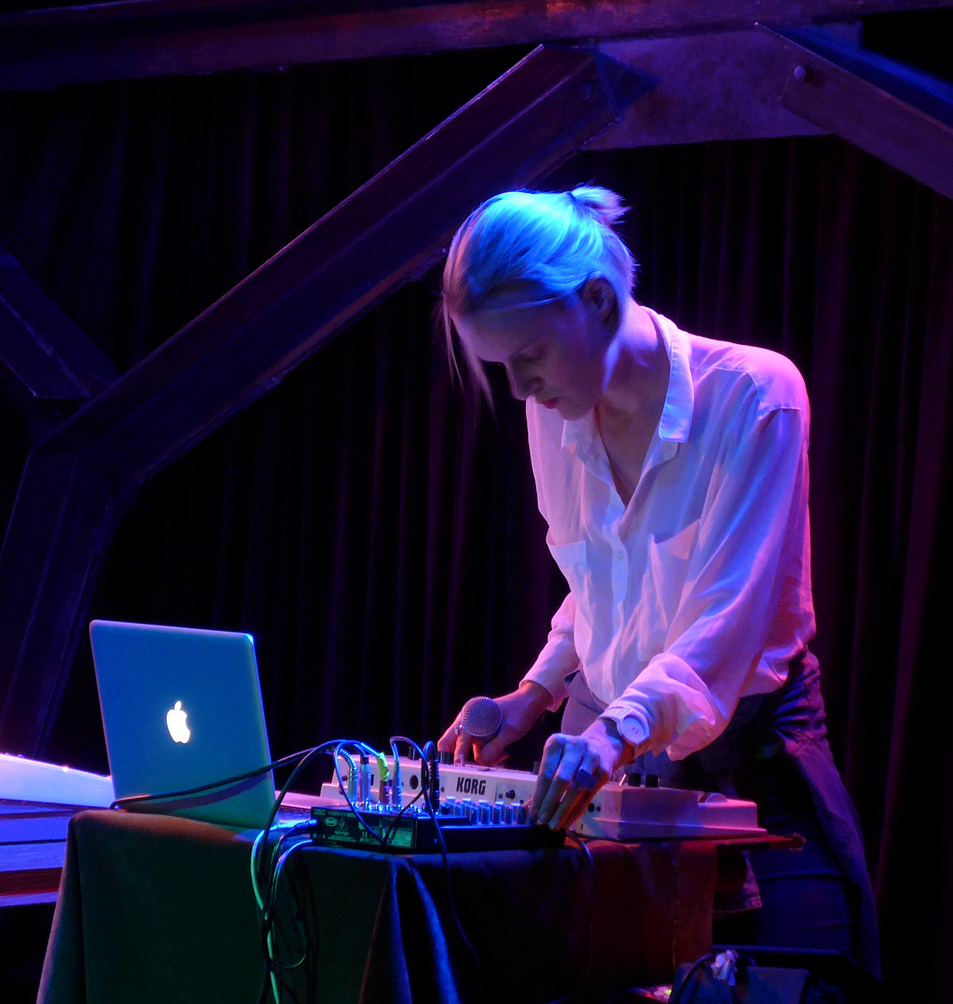
- Maria Minerva (2014)
- Born: Maria Juur; March 15, 1988 (age 38); Tallinn, then part of Estonian SSR, Soviet Union
- Citizenship: Estonia; United States
- Education: Estonian Academy of Arts (BA); Goldsmiths, University of London (MA)
- Musical career
- Genres: Electronica, outsider house, nu-disco, avant pop, hypnagogic pop, lo-fi music
- Occupations: producer, songwriter, singer
- Instruments: electronics, vocals
- Years active: 2010–present
- Labels: Not Not Fun, 100% Silk, Pudru Kuul, viis
- Website: www.mariaminerva.com

Maria Juur (born 15 March 1988), better known by her stage name Maria Minerva, is an Estonian musician, producer and DJ based in Los Angeles. She has recorded mainly for the Los Angeles labels Not Not Fun and its imprint 100% Silk, and in 2015 won two Estonian Music Awards. Her music is a part of the second wave of hypnagogic pop.

== Early life and education ==
Juur grew up in Tallinn. She is the daughter of the Estonian humorist, television presenter and music critic Mart Juur.

She graduated from the Estonian Academy of Arts with a bachelor's degree in art history in 2010. She obtained a master's degree in aural and visual cultures at Goldsmiths, University of London, where she studied with the British cultural theorist and music critic Mark Fisher.

== Career ==
Juur began recording music in London in 2009, while interning at The Wire, after buying instruments and equipment online. She signed with Not Not Fun after emailing the label on the last day of 2010. She began releasing music in 2011, when Not Not Fun and 100% Silk issued her album-length cassette Tallinn at Dawn and the 12-inch Noble Savage. The second album, Cabaret Cixous, followed that August on Not Not Fun; its title nods to the French feminist theorist Hélène Cixous. According to the Russian music outlet Zvuki.ru, the title alludes simultaneously to the band Cabaret Voltaire, which she cited among her influences around this time. In a later interview, she would also mention Cosey Fanni Tutti, Lætitia Sadier, Kim Gordon and Laurie Anderson as musical influences from youth. Reviewing the album for The Quietus, Rory Gibb called the record "bedroom pop with ambitions far more expansive than its four walls".

In 2012 Minerva released two albums on Not Not Fun: Will Happiness Find Me? and The Integration LP, a collaboration with label co-owner Amanda Brown's LA Vampires project, which The Quietus's Charlie Fox wrote "settles into a rhythm of intermittent greatness". Her fourth solo album, Histrionic (Not Not Fun, 2014), written after a move from London to New York, drew on contemporary club music; Fact's Maya Kalev found it "an enjoyable bedroom curiosity rather than a high achievement", while the Estonian culture newspaper Müürileht wrote it was, "according to many critics her best album yet". At the Estonian Music Awards in January 2015 she won Best Female Artist and Best Electronica Album for Histrionic. After a five-year break from solo albums, she returned in September 2020 with Soft Power, released digitally and on cassette by 100% Silk and described by XLR8R as "neon-lit diva-pop disco".

Minerva remixed John Cale for the 2012 release Extra Playful: Transitions, and appeared on the track "Remynd" from Cities Aviv's 2012 album Black Pleasure. She performed with Mark Van Hoen at the Unsound festival in New York in 2012, and in 2013 recorded the collaborative mix Maria2maria with the artist Maria Chavez. She appeared in Silk, a 2013 documentary about 100% Silk's 2012 tour.

With Ugnius Gelguda she created the soundtrack for Popcorn, Pepsi, Petabytes, a 2014 exhibition at the Hessel Museum of Art, CCS Bard. Her music appears in the visual artist Phil Collins's listening-booth installation my heart's in my hand, and my hand is pierced..., and she composed the soundtrack for Les Singes (2017), a performance work by Naomi Toth and the poet Vanessa Place. She has hosted Estonian Air, a monthly programme on the Los Angeles community radio station Dublab. She appeared in u.Q., a 2021 documentary by Ivar Murd about the musician Uku Kuut.

=== Collaboration with Cherushii ===
Minerva was a friend, labelmate and collaborator of the San Francisco producer Chelsea Faith Dolan, artistically known as Cherushii. In 2016, Dolan died in the Ghost Ship warehouse fire along with 35 other people. The two had written and recorded the bulk of six tracks together in the three years before Faith's death; Minerva completed the recordings with electronic music producers David Last, Adam Gunther and Brian Foote. 100% Silk released the material as the EP Cherushii & Maria Minerva in February 2019. The EP also repurposes two tracks from earlier Cherushii releases: "Thin Line", which first appeared on her 2015 album Memory of Water, and "Nobody's Fool (Vocal Version)", originally released as an instrumental in 2015.

=== viis label ===
In 2025 Minerva founded the label viis, whose first release collected previously unissued 2000s recordings by the Estonian pop-punk band Plixid, together with remixes by Minerva and Estonian musician Ines Daferrari.

== Critical reception ==
Fact called Minerva's music "arch avant-pop" and described her as an "experimental chanteuse", while Dazed & Confused characterized her early recordings as "densely yearning, electronic bedroom jams". NPR praised her "beautiful and mysterious lead vocals", Interview wrote that her singing "evokes the alienated soul of Nico", and Spin discussed her reverb-laden records among indie acts indebted to the music of Twin Peaks. Reviewing the 2011 EP Sacred & Profane Love for Pitchfork, Lindsay Zoladz called it "Minerva's most immediate release yet" and her music "a place where academia and pop culture… commingle in a hazy, libidinous swirl", and reviewing her 2019 EP with Cherushii, Pitchfork's Harley Brown described her "featherweight (and at times ever so slightly off-key) croon" as "a cross between Blossom Dearie, Brigitte Bardot, and the Estonian pop singers she grew up listening to".

Critics in the 2010s placed Minerva's music within the lo-fi and hypnagogic pop current of the period. Zvuki.ru counted her among the most representative artists of lo-fi's second generation. In 2011 Simon Reynolds named her among the foremost of a new wave of female synth musicians in a New York Times feature, describing her music as "hazy lo-fi synthpop". Fact wrote that she had come to embody the DIY aesthetic of her labels, Not Not Fun and 100% Silk. Writing in The Quietus, Rory Gibb distinguished her from other stylistically related Not Not Fun artists by her music's physicality and sense of motion.

NPR presented her in 2012 as the first artist to bring the sound out of the Baltic region, and as a potential forerunner for other Estonian acts. Writing for Bandcamp Daily in 2018, Daniel Dylan Wray called her "perhaps one of Estonia's best-known and celebrated contemporary artists", and Müürileht described her in 2015 as one of the few artists from Estonia to have "emerged to the top of the global alternative music scene". The online magazine Estonian World placed her on its 2015 list of the "Top 12 most outstanding Estonian women in the world". The Guardian included her in its 2017 interactive feature "The Sound of LA".

== Personal life ==
After leaving Estonia she lived in London and New York before settling in Los Angeles in the mid-2010s. She worked in the United States on O-1 "extraordinary ability" visas from 2013, obtained permanent residency in 2015, and later became a United States citizen.

== Discography ==
=== LPs ===
- Tallinn At Dawn CS (Not Not Fun, 2011)
- Cabaret Cixous LP (Not Not Fun, 2011)
- The Integration LP with LA Vampires (Not Not Fun, 2012)
- Will Happiness Find Me? LP (Not Not Fun, 2012)
- Histrionic LP (Not Not Fun, 2014)
- Soft Power CS (100% Silk, 2020)

=== EPs ===
- Ruff Trade EP (2011)
- Noble Savage 12" EP (100% Silk, 2011)
- Sacred & Profane Love 12" EP (100% Silk, 2011)
- Nii hea with Ajukaja, 10" single (Pudru Kuul, 2012)
- Bless 12" EP (100% Silk, 2013)
- C U Again with Ajukaja, 12" EP (Pudru Kuul, 2014)
- Cherushii & Maria Minerva with Cherushii, 12" EP (100% Silk, 2019)
- Contact High 12" EP (viis, 2026)
