= Confessions of a Romance Novelist =

Studio album by The Anchoress
- Released: January 15, 2016
- Genre: Indie rock
- Producer: Catherine Anne Davies, Paul Draper

The Anchoress chronology
| One for Sorrow (2014) | Confessions of a Romance Novelist (2016) | The Art of Losing (2021) |

Confessions of a Romance Novelist is the debut album from The Anchoress a.k.a. Catherine Anne Davies. Released on 15 January 2016, the album received a favourable critique from The Guardian.

The album was named amongst the Guardian critics' Albums of the Year, won HMV's Welsh Album of the Year, Best Newcomer at the PROG awards, and a nomination for Welsh Music Prize.

Mojo described Davies as being in possession of "a devastatingly powerful voice". The Observer called it "a blackly witty break up album...compelling", while PROG magazine described the record as "Kate Bush’s Hounds Of Love updated for the 21st century".

On the album, Catherine plays a variety of instruments, including piano, guitar, flute, omnichord, mellotron, wurlitzer, glockenspiel, and celeste, as well as sampling church bells, and an orchestra of typewriters.

== Track listing ==
All tracks composed by Catherine Anne Davies and Paul Draper; except where noted.

1. "Long Year" (Catherine Anne Davies) - 3:52
2. "What Goes Around" - 4:17
3. "Doesn't Kill You" - 4:40
4. "You and Only You" (featuring Paul Draper) - 4:09
5. "One for Sorrow" - 3:24
6. "P.S. Fuck You" - 3:19
7. "Popular" (Catherine Anne Davies) - 3:57
8. "Bury Me" (Catherine Anne Davies) - 3:43
9. "Intermission (Notes to the Editor)" (Catherine Anne Davies) - 2:09
10. "Waiting to Breathe" (Catherine Anne Davies) - 3:03
11. "Chip on Your Shoulder" - 2:58
12. "Confessions of a Romance Novelist" - 6:26
13. "Rivers of Ice" (Simple Minds, Iain McLachlan) - 3:41
