= Cherushii =

Cherushii Chelsea Faith Dolan
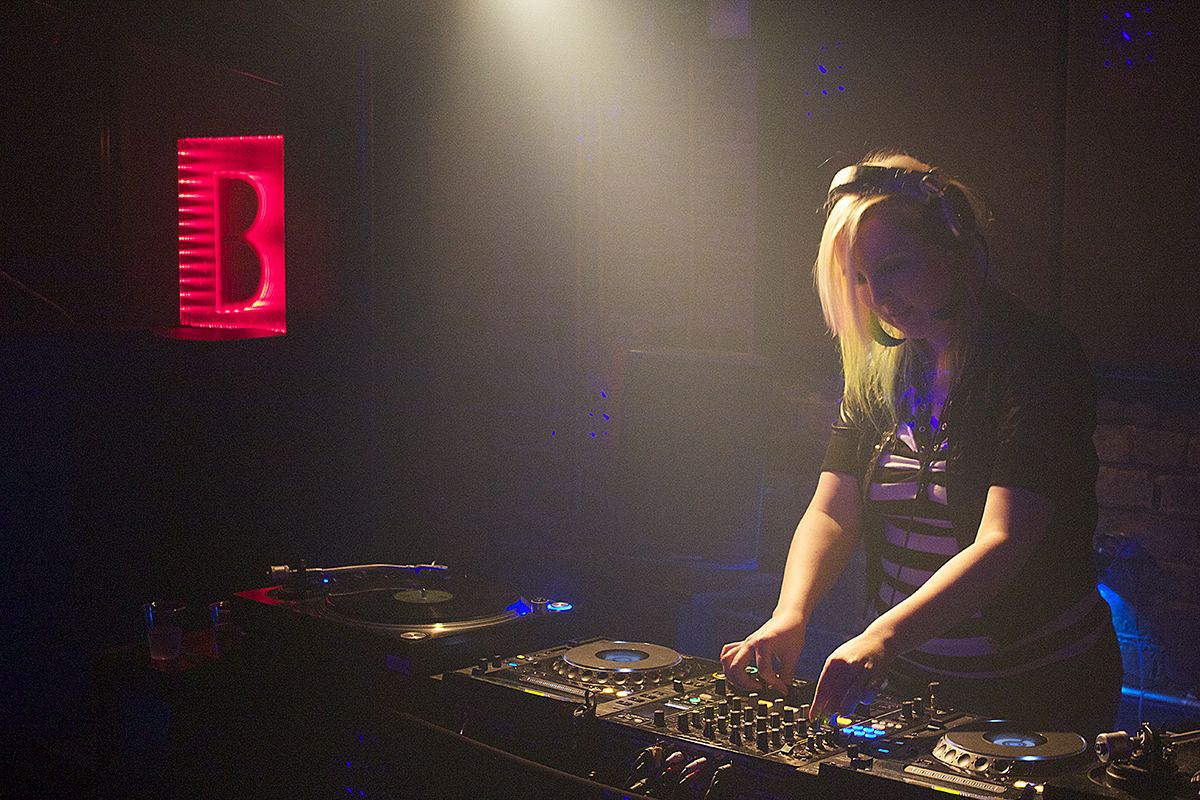
- Cherushii in 2016 performing at Run the Length of Your Wildness, a weekly dance music party she co hosted with Ben "Roche" Winans.

Background information
- Born: September 14, 1983
- Origin: Marin County, California, United States
- Died: December 2, 2016 (aged 33) Oakland, California, United States
- Years active: 2013–2016

Chelsea Faith Dolan, better known by her stage name Cherushii (September 14, 1983 – December 2, 2016), was an American electronic music producer, DJ, live performer, and radio host based in San Francisco.

Dolan was one of 36 victims of a fire that broke out at an underground venue and artist collective in Oakland, California called the Ghost Ship warehouse on December 2, 2016.

== Biography ==
Cherushii was born Chelsea Faith Dolan on September 14, 1983. She grew up in Marin County, California. She began playing music around the age of 6, when she was gifted a Casio keyboard. Cherushii was classically trained at the San Francisco Conservatory of Music as a teenager. After years of written correspondence with Japanese pen pals Chelsea traveled to Japan, where she adopted the moniker Cherushii because it was easier to pronounce than her name.

Her introduction to electronic music at raves in the early 2000s set the path for her career as an electronic musician. Cherushii was a champion of women in electronic music and recognized their contributions as a source of influence in a field that often lacks recognition for women. In an interview with the Chicago Reader about the influence of Detroit DJ and producer Kelli Hand (aka K-Hand) Cherushii said "I deeply admire her for all the work she's done, and yet her lack of recognition is so discouraging. In a culture as supposedly forward-thinking as electronic music, women are still so often invisible." From January 2014 to December 2016 Cherushii was host of radio shows on UC Berkeley's community radio station KALX, where she devoted sets to Italo Disco, Detroit techno, or contemporaries in the local electronic music scene such as David Last and Roche. In August 2015 Cherushii co-founded a dance music night called Run the Length of Your Wildness to provide a space for local electronic musicians to showcase their music.

=== Death ===
Cherushii was scheduled to perform at the Ghost Ship warehouse on December 2, 2016, as part of fellow music producer Golden Donna's (Joel Shanahan) tour. At approximately 11:20 pm a fire started inside the warehouse, trapping attendees inside. The Alameda County Coroner's Bureau confirmed 36 people trapped inside, including Cherushii, died of smoke inhalation. A public memorial was held on December 17, 2016, at Public Works in San Francisco. After learning of her death, Leor Galil wrote for the Chicago Reader, "Since then I've had the title track of her 2015 EP, Nobody's Fool, on repeat. Its bubbling percussion, cascading synth melodies, and four-on-the-floor hi-hat provide what feels like an endless supply of energy. This is the kind of music that inspires people to do things their own way, and I hope it will continue to encourage young artists excluded by mainstream touring circuits to create safe spaces for themselves."

== Music ==
In 2013, Cherushii signed with 100% Silk and released Queen of Cups, a four track album described as an "expansive blueprint of slow-burn deep house but threads it through with waves of synth wash, acid flash, and simmering strobe glow, for a loose yet composed suite of 21st-century free-spirit pulse generation." In 2015, Cherushii released three EPs: Starlight Express, Nobody's Fool, and Far Away So Close. In 2016 Cherushii released Manic. Influenced by house music, Detroit techno, and disco, she released several recordings on the independent dance music label 100% Silk, including Queen of Cups, Far Away So Close, and Memory of Water, reissued in 2017. KQED named Cherushii's album with her then-partner, Meow Wolf’s Arcade Soundtracks: Wiggy’s Plasma Plex one of the 10 best Bay Area albums of 2016. Fellow electronic musician Maria Minerva has called Cherushii "criminally underrated". After her death, 100% Silk released a memorial edition tape of Memory of Water, previously out of print. In 2019, the EP Cherushii & Maria Minerva was released, that had been nearly completed before Cherushii died and features repurposed tracks from previous Cherushii releases.

=== Gear ===
Cherushii opted for hardware analog gear at a time when laptops were transforming electronic music production and was known to carry heavy suitcases full of equipment to her shows.

== Discography ==
Albums:

- Memory of Water - 100% Silk, 2015
- Cherushii & Maria Minerva - 100% Silk, 2019 (posthumous release)

Singles and EPs:

- Queen of Cups (12”) - 100% Silk, 2013
- Far Away So Close (12”) - 100% Silk, 2015
- Starlight Express (EP), 2015
- Nobody's Fool (EP), 2015
- Manic (EP), 2016
