= Fishtown (art colony) =

The Asparagus Moonlight Group, exhibition flyer, 1971. Photo: Mary Randlett. Source: Fishtown Collection, Western Libraries Heritage Resources, Western Washington University.

Fishtown was an informal artists' community housed in a cluster of old cabins and fishing shacks on the Skagit River delta in Skagit County, Washington, USA, from the late 1960s to the mid 1980s. It was part of the larger Skagit Valley arts community, centered on the town of La Conner, but was rustic and isolated, without electricity or plumbing, and tended to attract younger and more eccentric artists. It was home to several noted painters, poets, and sculptors. Charles Krafft, who went on to international attention and controversy as a ceramicist, was for over ten years the "self-proclaimed Mayor of Fishtown"; another longtime resident was Robert Sund, who, along with several other poets, developed a recognizable Pacific Northwest style of poetry. Scholar, painter, and poet Paul Hansen, who became a professor of Chinese languages and noted translator of early Chinese poetry lived in Fishtown for several years, and best-selling author Tom Robbins was a frequent visitor.

Billing themselves as The Asparagus Moonlight Group, the Fishtown artists held successful exhibitions of their work in Seattle in 1971 and 1974. These helped establish the commune as a countercultural mecca of the Pacific Northwest.

With changing lifestyles and increasing pressure from the land's owners, the Fishtown artists' community gradually dispersed, beginning in the late 1970s. In 1988, most of the original fishing shacks and the boardwalks that connected them were demolished, amid protests by remaining residents and their supporters. A few "Fishtown artists", such as painter Maggie Wilder and sculptor Bo Miller, continue to live and work in the area.

Boardwalk at Fishtown. Photo: Heidi Obzina / David King (1978-79)

== Background ==
A desire to live a more natural and simple lifestyle was an important aspect of the hippie counterculture of the 1960s; this impulse lead to the creation of hundreds of new co-operative communities in the United States. These communes had a variety of different intents and structures, ranging from carefully organized religious or agricultural communes to more relaxed artists' colonies, of which there was already a long history in the U.S.

In the Pacific Northwest there were a number of established artists living or working regularly in Washington's Skagit Valley (about 60 mi. north of Seattle), an area where mist-filtered sunlight brought soft illumination to river-crossed farmland ringed by forested mountains, marshes, coastal tidelands, and the expanse of Puget Sound. This landscape had been an inspiration to artists of the internationally renowned 'Northwest School', particularly Guy Anderson and Morris Graves. Both had grown up nearby, and lived in or near Skagit Valley at various times. Anderson had permanently moved to the town of La Conner, on the Swinomish Channel, in 1959.

== Beginnings ==
Charles Krafft (b. 1948) was a young writer and artist from Seattle inspired by the poets Li Po and Gary Snyder, and by the 'mystic' artists of the Northwest School, with whom he shared an interest in Buddhism and Asian art. After travels in India and Europe and time amid San Francisco's counterculture, Krafft returned to the Northwest. He had earlier befriended Morris Graves and Guy Anderson, and while visiting Anderson in La Conner became enamored of the Skagit Valley. In 1968 he joined sculptor Art Jorgenson as a settler of "Fishtown", the local name given to a group of fishing shacks connected by an elevated boardwalk, near where the North Fork of the Skagit River empties into Puget Sound. The shacks had fallen into disuse after declining salmon runs led to a ban on gill-netting. The property's owner charged $10 a month in rent for each shack.

Soon other artists, philosophers, and eccentrics arrived. Woodcarver and architect Bo Miller built a new shack and helped improve others, as did brothers Hans and Eric Nelsen. Krafft and poet/scholar Paul Hansen decorated buildings with Buddhist script. Recalled Hans Nelsen: "There were poets and sculptors and some truly great painters working mostly in ink and water based medium. They were very influenced by Chinese and Japanese art, and were studying Chinese poetry, philosophy, Buddhism. People were meditating. The setting looked like a Chinese landscape and it inspired people."

== 1970s heyday ==
By the early 1970s Fishtown had a steady flow of visitors and several year-round residents, with Krafft serving as the commune's "self-proclaimed mayor", organizing basic logistics - although, as Bo Miller would later point out, "There was no control over anybody else's life out there. We weren't looking for a father figure. We weren't looking for someone to tell us what to do. We knew, each, bloody well what we wanted to do. We were strong personalities."

A large storage shed/boathouse with double doors was renamed "the Temple" and used for meetings, meditation classes, musical sessions, and beer parties. A group of abandoned cabins a short distance upriver gradually became part of the community, while further downriver poet Robert Sund built up his own shack, which became a meeting place for the group of poets known as The Great Blue Heron Society - at various times including Paul Hansen, Glenn Turner, Clifford Burke, Tim McNulty, Sam Hamill, Finn Wilcox, Steve Herold, and others. Though never more than a loose affiliation, they developed a distinctively spare, earthy style of Northwest poetry.

In February 1971 a group show of works by Fishtown artists Alan Benditt, F. L. Decker, Arthur Jorgenson, Charles Krafft, Aurora Jellybean (Virginia Shaw), Eric and Hans Nelsen, Tom Skinner, and Robert Sund - collectively known as The Asparagus Moonlight Group - opened at the Second Storey Gallery in Seattle's Pioneer Square. In 1974 the Seattle Art Museum sponsored Skagit Valley Artists, an exhibition featuring several Fishtown artists held at the Seattle Center. The success of these shows brought considerable attention to the artists of the Skagit River and nearby La Conner, as did the surprise success in 1971 of the novel Another Roadside Attraction by local writer Tom Robbins.

Wrote Charles Krafft in 1992: "My memories of the period are ones of an extended celebration set against a backdrop of rustic simplicity and awesome natural beauty. Weather permitting, artists picnicked together, explored the sloughs in leaky scows, danced all night and even roller skated en masse regularly. We recklessly traded beers and blatherskite, books, tools, sweethearts, and insults in the town taverns[.]"

== Later years ==
In the late 1970s changing lifestyles led to many Fishtown residents moving on - some to new careers in other states, some, such as Bo Miller and Jo Jeffrey, simply moving into homes with electricity and running water nearby. Art Jorgenson and a few others remained, and several new residents arrived. Charles Krafft was key in organizing Skagit Valley artists' participation in the Northwest/New York exhibitions at the Bayard Gallery in Soho in 1980 - 81, although he himself had moved back to Seattle in 1980.

In the mid-1980s the owners of the property, the Chamberlain family, began clear-cutting the land around Fishtown with an eye toward development. Residents and supporters used protest and legal action to try and stave off the logging trucks, culminating in a clash in which renowned artist Richard Gilkey and several others, including Shuksan Earth First!ers, were arrested by Skagit County sheriff's deputies. After this, in 1988, the area was extensively logged and most of the shacks, boardwalks, and cabins demolished.

== Legacy ==
The cabin built by Marty Chamberlain and John Bisbee still stands. It is occupied year round by a forest caretaker.

Retrospective exhibitions that have featured work by Fishtown artists include:

- Skagit Valley Artists, 1974 - 1992 (Valley Museum of Northwest Art, La Conner, WA, 1992)
- You Can't Get There from Here, Art and Life on the Lower Skagit (KOBO Gallery, Seattle, WA, 2007)
- Fishtown and the Skagit River (Museum of Northwest Art, La Conner, WA, 2010)
