= Root Cellar (poem) =

"Root Cellar" is a poem written by the American poet Theodore Roethke (1908-1963) published in Roethke's second collection, The Lost Son and Other Poems, in 1948 in Garden City, New York. The poem belongs among Roethke's series of "Greenhouse Poems" the first section of The Lost Son, a sequence hailed as "one of the permanent achievements of modern poetry" and marked as the point of Roethke's metamorphosis from a minor poet into one of "the first importance", into the poet James Dickey would regard among the greatest of any in American history.

Roethke grew up in Saginaw, Michigan, where his father, Otto, owned a 25-acre greenhouse. Roethke, in his letters, described the greenhouse as his "symbol for the whole of life, a womb, a heaven-on-earth". Roethke's father died when Roethke was fourteen, the same year his uncle committed suicide, a circumstance which looms behind Roethke's conception of the greenhouse.

Within a greenhouse, the root cellar functions to keep roots alive, allowing them to grow in this underground structure. Roethke vividly portrays the root cellar in "a violent inferno of creation".

== Poem ==
"Root Cellar" saw publication before The Lost Son, in the November 1943 issue of Poetry, under the title "Florist's Root Cellar". Generally, discourse and anthologies use the later The Lost Son title, "Root Cellar".

== Text ==
Nothing would sleep in that cellar, dank as a ditch,

Bulbs broke out of boxes hunting for chinks in the dark,

Shoots dangled and drooped,

Lolling obscenely from mildewed crates,

Hung down long yellow evil necks, like tropical snakes.

And what a congress of stinks!-

Roots ripe as old bait,

Pulpy stems, rank, silo-rich,

Leaf-mold, manure, lime, piled against slippery planks.

Nothing would give up life:

Even the dirt kept breathing a small breath.

== Structure ==
In eleven lines of free verse, "Root Cellar" consists almost in its entirety of images of the root cellar. The poem highlights the "dank" humidity of its setting and engages with a range of the reader's senses. The verse abounds with dynamic visual imagery of the roots, bulbs, and stems practically growing before the eyes of the speaker. The olfactory imagery of the cellar's rankness, presented largely in a litany following the sixth line, blends with the tactile nature of the "slippery planks" in the ninth line. Strong stresses and spondees, emphasized by consistent alliteration and slant rhymes, evince the same action and vitality in language that the speaker of the poem perceives in the vegetation of the cellar. Roethke leverages the free verse form to achieve an extreme "manipulation of vowel and consonant" sounds.

The "parallel clauses" of the first and tenth lines, both beginning "Nothing would," create a frame for the poem. This frame structure makes an "etymological pun" on the word cellar, deriving from the Latin cella, broadly meaning "room," thus mirroring the setting of the poem in its construction as a poem of containment. Cella is also the root also for "cell," "the unit of life and growth."

Roethke's metaphors exist "both tenor and vehicle" in the realm of the concrete and the natural. From this physical world, the poem asks the reader to draw out the abstractions themselves, refusing to supply much in the way of interpretation within its verse. This dynamic creates a relationship between the reader and the poem of almost equal parts, inviting the reader to "join in the act of creation" by synthesizing an individual meaning on the part of the reader within the world of the poem. This experience of living in the imagery of the poem, of stepping into the root cellar and contemplating its intricacies, mirrors the boyhood of Roethke in his father's greenhouse.

== Themes ==
In reflection, Roethke described the greenhouse as "both heaven and hell". The imagery of "Root Cellar", with adjectives such as "obscenely" and "evil" in lines four and five, complicate the fecund nature of the greenhouse, oscillating "between the extremes of grave and nest". There seems to exist the notion of "danger and uncertain sexual forces", making "the procreative" threatening. The speaker wrestles with the unrelenting impulse of the vegetation to persist in living. The sheer force with which the life of the root cellar endures becomes "terrifying and perverse", forcing the reader to confront the "complexity and trauma of survival in the aftermath of birth".

Perhaps, the meaning in this poem rests entirely within its verbs, the "energy" the poem conveys its merit, within its "chaos of aimless and bewildering multiplicity". This energy filters through and is reflected by the reader, with whom the task of interpreting the poem's imagistic action lies.

== Critical response ==
"Root Cellar", among the other "Greenhouse Poems", earned considerable critical praise. As Blessing establishes, "almost everyone agrees" that the greenhouse poems "contain some of the finest poems that Roethke ever wrote". However, as these poems leave the possibility for interpretation largely wide open, critics have come to a range of conclusions as to how "Root Cellar" and the other greenhouse poems should be considered. Some critics, such as Wolff in his short article on "Root Cellar", project biographical information about Roethke onto the verse, perceiving the "rejected child's need for parental love" embedded within the poem. Karl Malkoff argues that the implications of the greenhouse poems are "hardly dependent upon extra-literary references".

Richard Blessing claims the critical difficulty of interpreting the greenhouse poems derives from the fact that they are "too simple", that "critical apparatus is not designed for a primitive, descriptive poetry, a poetry with few tropes, no allusions, a clear vocabulary and syntax, and almost no abstractions."
