= KwaZulu-Natal Youth Choir =

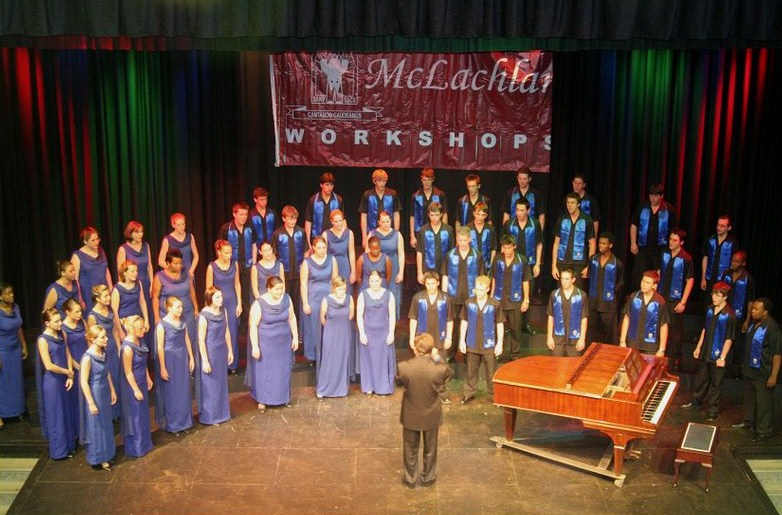
KwaZulu-Natal Youth Choir

The KwaZulu-Natal Youth Choir was founded in 1968 by Hein de Villiers. The choir is based in Durban, South Africa, and attracts talent from across the KwaZulu-Natal province.

Under the guidance of its artistic director, Gerard'd Du Toit, the KwaZulu-Natal Youth Choir participates both nationally and internationally. Some of the more notable invitations received includes the IFAS choir competition in the Czech Republic and the International Chamber Choir Competition Marktoberdorf, Germany.

== Conductors ==
- 1968 to ?: Hein de Villiers
- 1983 to 1988: Pieter Snyman
- Veronica van Rooyen
- Rykie Boeke
- 1996 to 2020: Gerard'd du Toit
- 2021 to present: Bernard Kruger

== History ==
1968 – The choir is recognised as the regional representative Youth Choir. (9 August)

1971 – Performs at the 10th Republic Festival in Cape Town and Stellenbosch.

1973 – Participates in the International Europiad for Folk in Sardinia. Performs eight concerts in Belgium.

1974 – Performs Mozart's Coronation Mass for the Natal Performing Arts Council.

1975 – Tours to Cape Town as guest of the University of Cape Town and SANLAM.

1982 – Tour to England, Austria and Italy under the direction of Hein de Villiers.

1987 – Participates in National Choral Festival in Port Elizabeth.

1988 – Favourite choir at the annual Youth Arts Festival of the Department of Education and Culture, South Africa.

1989 – Tour to Italy and Austria under the direction of Veronica van Rooyen. Placed third out of 13 choirs in the International Competition in Graz.

1989 to 1991 – Favourite choir at the annual Youth Arts Festival of the Department of Education and Culture, South Africa.

1992 – Tour to Hungary and Austria under the direction of Rykie Boeke. First South African Choir to participate in the Béla Bartók International Choir Competition in Debrecen. The choir is placed 6th out of 38 choirs from 17 countries. The KZN Youth Choir is the first SA Choir to participate in the annual Viennese Youth and Music Festival after the lifting of sanctions.

1994 – The choir is invited to participate in an International Youth Choir Festival in Kempele, Finland. A Protea Friendship club is established in Finland and the visit of the Kempele Youth Choir is a direct result of his tour.

1995 – Host choir of the First International Pietermaritzburg Youth Choir Festival.

1996 – Concert and Competition tour to England, France, Belgium and the Netherlands during the July holidays.

1997 – Participates under the direction of Gérard'd du Toit in the national Youth Choir Festival in Kempton Park and in the Second Pietermaritzburg International Youth Choir Festival.

1998 – Participates in the 27th International "Jugend und Musik in Wien" festival in Vienna, Austria. The choir is placed second the Youth Choir Category out of 17 entries. The only South African choir invited to participate in the Summer Festival in Bratislava, Slovakia. The choir toured the Czech Republic, Slovakia, Austria and Germany.

1999 – Two CD's were released, namely: "The Immoral Bach" and "Otche Nash". The choir participated in the Prestige Choir Festival at the University of Pretoria in July.

2000 – The only South African choir to be invited to participate in the International Choir Competition in Spittal an der Drau, Austria. Concert tour includes Spain, France, Italy and Switzerland.

2001 – Choir participates in the Klein Karoo National Arts Festival.

2002 – Tour to Bloemfontein as the demonstration choir at the annual Philip MacLachlan Choral Conducting Seminar.

2003 – The first South African choir to be invited to participate at the 27th International Sacred Choir Festival and 9th International sacred Choir Competition in Preveza, Greece. The choir obtained a first prize in the Best presented and balanced Folklore programme – 26 choirs from 16 countries participated, and was placed 2nd in the Youth Choir Category and 3rd mixed adult chamber vocal ensembles . The choir was also the favourite choir amongst the public and the choirs. The release of the C.D. entitled "Celebration" – celebrating its 35th anniversary.

2004 – Invited to perform at the opening ceremony of the International MacLachlan X with the Free State Youth Symphony Orchestra in Stellenbosch on 25 March 2004. Mr. G. du Toit to act as clinician.

2005 – The KZN Youth Choir toured Europe and visited Austria and Germany during this time. They performed with the Ulmer Spatzen Choir in Ulm. The Youth Choir also participated in the 4th Johannes Brahms International Choir Competition & Festival. The choir obtain two gold medals and achieved first and third place in the two categories they participated in. In 2005 the choir obtained numerous awards from the South African Choral Association. Mr. Gerard'd du Toit won best Conductor, Roland Perold won best accompanist and Mrs. Ilse Bothma won best Administrator for choirs. The choir's ever popular CDs also obtained its first award for the 2004 KZN Youth Choir CD.

2007 – The choir is invited to attend the "Music Youth and Dance Celebrations" in Tallinn, Estonia and forms part of a 32,000-strong mass choir performing in front of 18,0000 spectators in an open-air venue. The choir performs with the members of the Estonian Youth Symphony Orchestra before travelling to Saint Petersburg, Moscow and finally Ulm. Here the choir performs with the Ulmer Spatzen Choir.

2008 – A very successful tour to the Free State, Cape Town and Eastern Cape is undertaken, together with the Chamber Orchestra of the Nomme Music School of Tallinn, Estonia under the baton of Jüri-Ruut Kangur. The UKZN Bel Canto Chamber Choir, as the senior choir of the KZN Youth Choir and as associated choir to the Department of Music at UKZN – Durban, is invited to participate in the 20th IFAS competition in Pardubice, Czech Republic (IFAS – International Festival of Academic Choirs). The choir wins a gold certificate, placing second in the Indigenous Folklore category.

2009 – The KZN Youth Choir participated in the Cecilia Seghizzi International Choir Competition in Gorizia, Italy in July 2009. The choir was awarded three premium awards, one in Folklore, The UKZN Bel Canto Chamber choir in the Jazz Category, and the Public Prize for the most popular choir was also awarded to the KZN Youth Choir.

The choir met their partner choir, the Ljubljana Madrigalisti under the baton of Andreja Martinjak in Ljubljana, and the choirs performed on the Marketplatz.

== 2011 ==
The Choir was selected to compete in the 9th International Choir Competition "Antonio Vivaldi" which was held in Karpenisi, Greece. From 30 June to 3 July 2011 the Choir competed in 3 categories:

Category C – Children/Youth Choirs – where the choir scored a total of 98% and walked away with a gold medal and the first prize in that category.

Category E – Sacred Music – The choir scored a total of 98% and was awarded a gold medal and the first prize in that category.

Category F – Folklore – The choir scored a total of 100% and was awarded a gold medal as well as the first prize in that category.

The choir also walked away with 4 other awards:

Maestro Conductor: Mr. Gérard'd du Toit.

Highest Mark Obtained in the Competition: KwaZulu-Natal Youth Choir.

Most Popular Choir by Public Vote: KwaZulu Natal-Youth Choir.

Best Folklore Performance in the Festival: KwaZulu-Natal Youth Choir.
