= Maria Minerva's Cabaret Cixous =

Studio album by Maria Minerva
- Released: August 1, 2011
- Genre: hypnagogic pop; bedroom pop; synth-pop
- Label: Not Not Fun

Maria Minerva chronology
Tallinn at Dawn (2011)	Maria Minerva's Cabaret Cixous (2011)	Will Happiness Find Me? (2012)

Maria Minerva's Cabaret Cixous (commonly referred to as Cabaret Cixous) is the second album by Estonian musician Maria Minerva, following the cassette-only Tallinn at Dawn (2011). (Note: Some outlets instead described Cabaret Cixous as Minerva's first full-length album, treating the cassette-only Tallinn at Dawn separately.) It was released on August 1, 2011 by Not Not Fun. Its title alludes to the French feminist theorist Hélène Cixous, and, according to the Russian music outlet Zvuki.ru, simultaneously to the band Cabaret Voltaire.

== Background and release ==
Maria Minerva, an Estonian-born student living in London, began recording at home in 2009 and signed with the Los Angeles label Not Not Fun after emailing it at the end of 2010; the label and its 100% Silk imprint released her cassette Tallinn at Dawn and the 12-inch EP Noble Savage in early 2011. Minerva described Cabaret Cixous as "a sequel" to those two releases, saying that the tracks on all three "are from the same time period, mostly produced before I even became affiliated with Not Not Fun, between late 2009, and early 2011". The album was recorded in Tallinn and London and mastered in Los Angeles; its cover artwork is by the Estonian designer Ronald Pihlapson. A music video for the track "Lovecool", directed by Spencer Longo under the name New Feeling Industries, accompanied the release, and Minerva played her first live show at the Shacklewell Arms in London on August 22, 2011.

== Themes and composition ==
Critics related the album's lyrical and conceptual frame to feminist theory. The title refers to Hélène Cixous, and the track "Spiral" opens with a sampled excerpt of the theorist Avital Ronell; Simon Reynolds of The New York Times reported that Minerva drew on Cixous's notion of écriture féminine, quoting her description of the songs as being "about being uncomfortable as a young woman in the world". Josh Becker of Beats Per Minute heard "feminist aggression—or at least, a refusal to remain passive" as a theme of the record.

Musically, Rory Gibb of The Quietus described the album as marking an audible jump in production values over Minerva's earlier releases while remaining "of a piece" with Not Not Fun's blurred, smudged sound, and identified dub as one of its main reference points, with bass "a constant companion" and the closer "Ruff Trade" built on offbeat guitar upstrokes. Becker characterized Minerva's style as "bedroom disco", a blend of danceable beats and lo-fi electronica touching on psychedelia and new-age music, and noted the early-1990s R&B bassline of opener "These Days" and the industrial rhythm of "Pirate's Tale". The album includes a cover of ABBA's "Honey, Honey", rendered, in Becker's description, "darker and woozier" than the original. "Laulan päikse käes", whose Estonian title Becker translated as "I sing in the sun", was singled out by several reviewers: Gibb called it the album's highlight, "a broken dance track" that "slowly and gracefully collapses in upon itself", while Oli Warwick of Juno Daily described it as the point where the album "comparatively bangs".

== Critical reception ==
Reviewing the album for The Quietus, Gibb called it "still bedroom pop, but ... bedroom pop with ambitions far more expansive than its four walls", distinguishing Minerva from "the hypnagogic set" by her music's physical engagement and evocation of motion. Stephen Fruitman of Igloo Magazine called the album "a transcendent listening experience" and wrote that Minerva "has the potential to be one of the most entertaining and relevant artists of the very near future". Becker concluded that with the album Minerva had "stepped out of her bedroom and into the eclectic, dimly-lit electronic underground".

Tiny Mix Tapes found that, despite the record's coherence and an aesthetic the reviewer found distinctive, none of the tracks leapt out as on her earlier EP, so that the album "tends to slip past the ear, sacrificing personality for coherence". Warwick, writing for Juno Daily, compared the record's "ethereal, degraded quality" to Hype Williams while crediting it with "a greater consistency and immediacy" than that group's output.

The album raised Minerva's profile: Reynolds cited it that October when naming her among the foremost of a new wave of female synth musicians, and Fact later referred to the record as her "magisterial Cabaret Cixous LP".

== Track listing ==
No.	Title	Length
1.	"These Days"	2:50
2.	"Pirate's Tale"	5:48
3.	"Lovecool"	5:36
4.	"Once Upon"	2:34
5.	"Honey Honey"	2:17
6.	"Laulan päikse käes"	4:19
7.	"Soo High"	3:12
8.	"I Luv Ctrl"	3:36
9.	"Favourite Song (Italo interlude)"	1:41
10.	"Spiral"	3:19
11.	"Ruff Trade"	4:15
Total length:		39:27
