= Paradelle =

The paradelle is a modern poetic form which was invented by United States Poet Laureate Billy Collins as a parody of the villanelle.

== Derivation ==
Billy Collins originally said the paradelle was invented in 11th-century France, but he later admitted that he invented it himself to parody strict forms of poetry, particularly the villanelle. His sample paradelle, "Paradelle for Susan" (c. 1997), was seemingly intentionally terrible, completing the final stanza with the line "Darken the mountain, time and find was my into it was with to to".

== Form ==
When Collins first published the paradelle, it was with the footnote "The paradelle is one of the more demanding French fixed forms, first appearing in the langue d'oc love poetry of the eleventh century. It is a poem of four six-line stanzas in which the first and second lines, as well as the third and fourth lines of the first three stanzas, must be identical. The fifth and sixth lines, which traditionally resolve these stanzas, must use all the words from the preceding lines and only those words. Similarly, the final stanza must use every word from all the preceding stanzas and only these words."

== Other uses ==
Not all reviewers of Collins' book recognized that the paradelle was a parody of formal poetry and of amateur poets who adhered to formalism at the expense of sense. Some reviews criticized "Paradelle for Susan" as an amateurish attempt at a difficult form without ever understanding that this was, indeed, the point.

Some poets also missed the parody and took the form seriously, writing their own paradelles. Others, knowing of the hoax, nevertheless decided to see what they could do with a form as strict as the paradelle's. Thus, although invented as a hoax, the paradelle has taken on a life of its own. In 2005, Red Hen Press published an anthology of paradelles. When the book was released, a panel on the paradelle was held at the West Chester University Poetry Conference featuring contributors to the book Annie Finch, R.S. Gwynn, and David Mason as well as editor Theresa Welford.
