= The Anchoress (musician) =

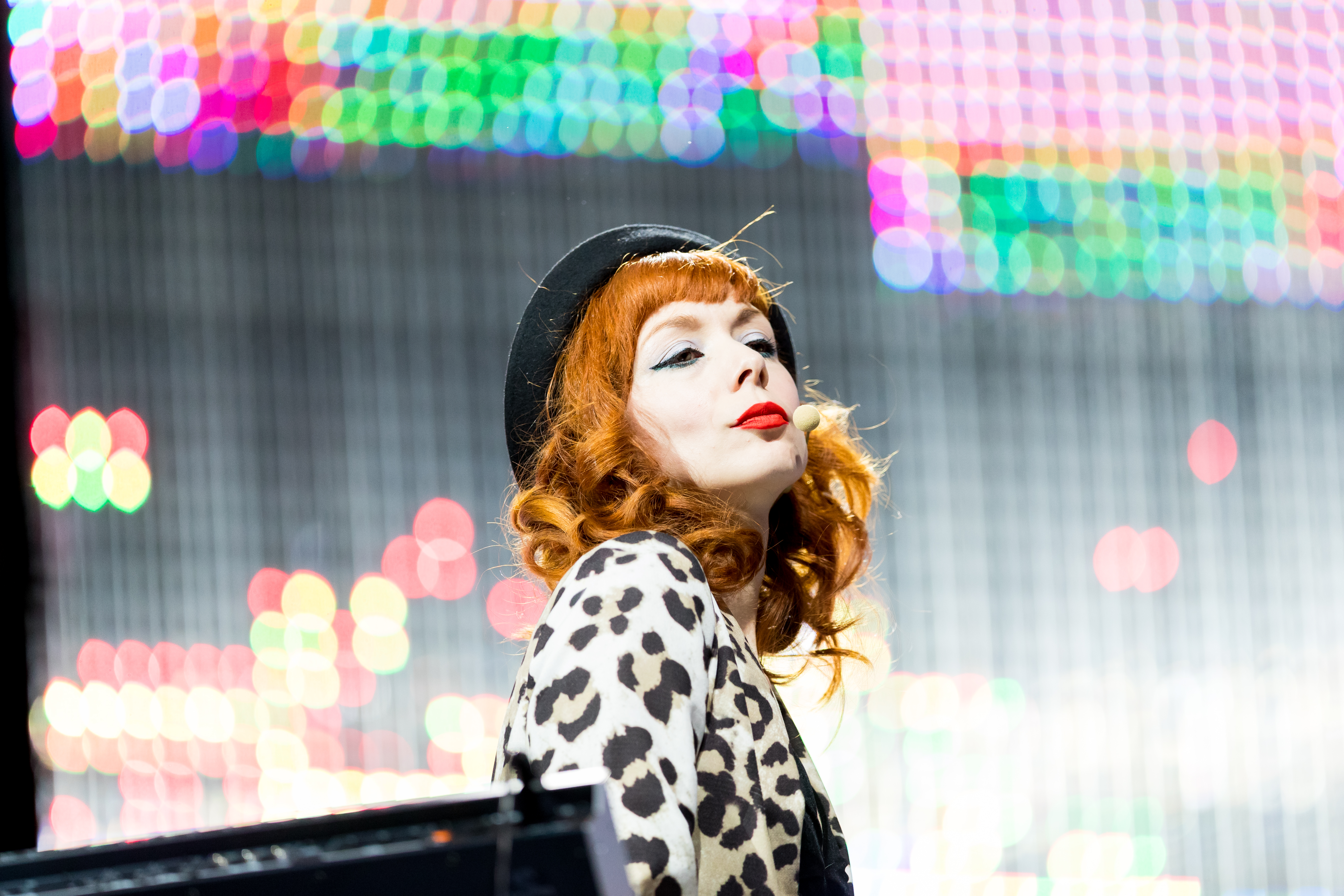
- Simple Minds at Rock the Ring 2018

Background information
- Also known as: Catherine A.D.
- Born: Catherine Anne Davies; Glynneath, Wales
- Origin: Aylesbury, Buckinghamshire, England
- Education: University College London (PhD, Literature and Queer Theory)
- Genres: Indie rock; pop
- Occupations: Singer-songwriter; record producer; multi-instrumentalist; author
- Instruments: Piano, guitar, flute, synthesiser, mellotron, vocals
- Years active: 2013–present
- Labels: Kscope; Too Pure; Last Night From Glasgow
- Website: theanchoress.co.uk

Catherine Anne Davies, known professionally as The Anchoress, is a British singer-songwriter, multi-instrumentalist, record producer and author.

During her acclaimed career as The Anchoress, Davies has written and produced three albums and one collection of covers. Her 2016 debut Confessions of a Romance Novelist, was followed by The Art of Losing in 2021, the covers collection Versions (2023), and As We Once Were (2026).

Davies has been recognised by the music industry and academia for her contributions to music production, receiving three Self-Produced Artist nominations at the Music Producer Guild Awards including for The Art of Losing, completing a PhD in English Literature in 2023 and combining both fields to become the first female Professor of Music Production at ICMP in 2026.

== Early years ==
Davies was born in Glynneath, Wales and grew up in Aylesbury, Buckinghamshire, England. Trained as a classical flautist from the age of seven, she played in youth orchestras before discovering her sister's guitar at age 12. She developed an interest in both songwriting and music production, and broke into music while she was studying English at university, with a residency at London's Southbank Centre alongside Nitin Sawhney.

== Biography ==
Davies formed The Anchoress in 2013. The Anchoress' debut album Confessions of a Romance Novelist, was released on 15th of January 2016 via Kscope. The album was named amongst the Guardian critics' Albums of the Year, won HMV's Welsh Album of the Year, Best Newcomer at the PROG awards, and a nomination for Welsh Music Prize.. Confessions of a Romance Novelist was described by MOJO as showcasing "a devastatingly powerful voice," by PROG Magazine as "Kate Bush's Hounds of Love updated for the 21st century," and by The Observer as "a blackly witty breakup album... compelling."

Both of Davies' first two studio albums were entirely self-produced as well as critically lauded by the press and fellow musicians. Second album The Art of Losing (2021) received a Metacritic score of 83 — denoting "Universal Acclaim" — and was named amongst the "Best Albums of 2021" by numerous publications, including The Sunday Times, PROG Magazine, Record Collector, The Line of Best Fit, The Sun, Yorkshire Post, and Classic Rock. Sir Elton John named The Art of Losing one of his favourite records of the year; Caitlin Moran described it as "the inadvertent, beautiful and truthful soundtrack to this moment".

Davies has been nominated three times for Self-Producing Artist of the Year at the Music Producers Guild Awards (2022, 2023, 2024), making her one of the most recognised women in UK music production.

In October 2019, Davies launched a new podcast series titled The Art of Losing, taking on the topic of loss and grief, with guests including the producer and engineer Mario McNulty and playwright Patrick Jones. Davies gave her second album the same name. The first single, "Show Your Face", featuring guest guitars from James Dean Bradfield, was premiered by Steve Lamacq on BBC 6Music and the accompanying video premiered on NME.com.

Davies has been a Senator of the Ivors Academy since 2021. In her second term, she sits on the Disability & Neurodiversity Committee and is establishing a new Parents & Carers Council.

In January 2022, Davies was among the most prominent UK artists to publicly challenge Damon Albarn's claim that Taylor Swift "doesn't write her own songs." Davies connected Albarn's comments to systemic issues in the industry, writing in the NME: "Damon Albarn's attitude towards female authorship is the same reason only 2 per cent of producers are female, and why many women eventually exit the industry completely."

In October 2023 Davies released her third album Versions, consisting of reworkings of songs by such artists as Radiohead, R.E.M., Depeche Mode, Nirvana, and The Cure.

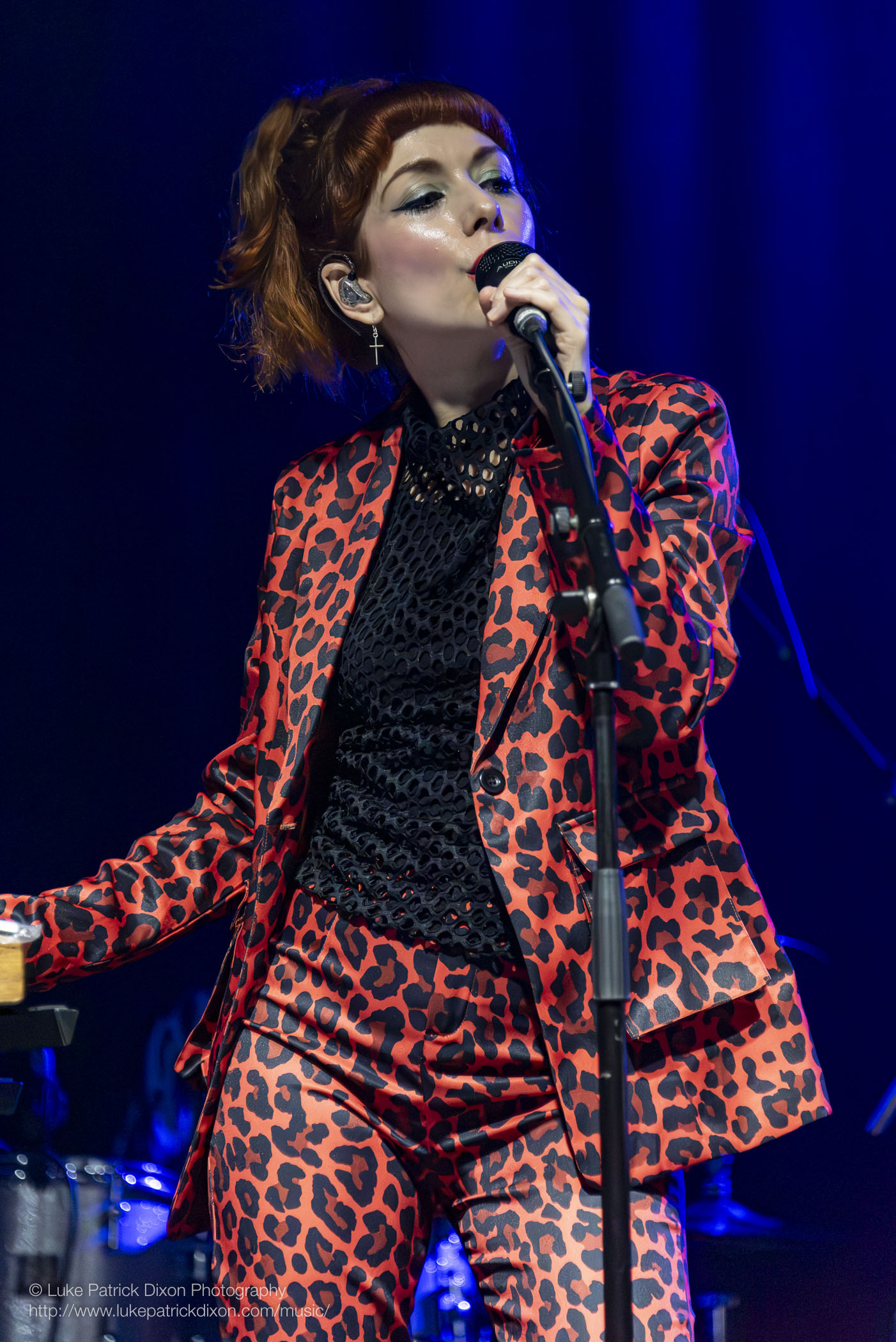
The Anchoress performing at End of the Road Festival, Dorset, England 2nd September 2023

In 2024, Davies was appointed as the first female Professor of Music Production and Songwriting at ICMP (Institute of Contemporary Music Performance) and SAE.

In April 2025, Davies supported Manic Street Preachers across two nights at the O2 Shepherd's Bush Empire (18–19 April) as part of their Critical Thinking tour.

In August 2026, Davies is set to release As We Once Were via Last Night From Glasgow — her third studio album of original material. The 14-track album was self-produced at Black Lodge Studios using vintage synthesisers from Pete Townshend's collection, and features guest appearances from Gwenno, James Dean Bradfield, Hannah Peel and Eaves Wilder. It was mixed by Dave Eringa and mastered by Jon Astley.

== Solo, collaborations and side projects ==
Prior to the Anchoress project, Davies self-released music under her own name and as Catherine A.D.

In 2009, Davies performed with London Philharmonic Orchestra as an artist-in-residence at London's South Bank Centre. Through this role, she wrote with Riz MC and collaborated with Nitin Sawhney.

In 2011, under the abbreviated A.D. guise, Davies released the single "Carry Your Heart", and a mini-album titled Communion. NME described Communion as an "understated but beautiful mini-album" when naming it one of the 20 best "cult/experimental" albums of 2011. She also released a collection of covers titled Reprise. The release featured re-interpretations of songs by Friendly Fires, Sleigh Bells, Nick Drake, Tracy Chapman, Bon Iver, Hurts, My Brightest Diamond, the Crystals, Nina Simone and the Magnetic Fields.

From 2014 until July 2018, Davies performed in Simple Minds, contributing additional guitar, vocals and keyboards. She met Jim Kerr, the lead singer and one of the principal songwriters in Simple Minds, when both were in the Dark Flowers, a band assembled to record a 2013 album of songs based on a Sam Shepard book. She has also performed live with Ed Harcourt at Glastonbury Festival, as well as Martha Wainwright.

In 2015, Davies also appeared as a backing vocalist on Emmy the Great's debut single "Secret Circus".

In July 2016, The Anchoress supported and duetted with Manic Street Preachers at the Eden Project and again supported the band in June 2017, before duetting on "Little Baby Nothing" at the Q Awards in October 2017. She supported Simple Minds on the UK leg of their Acoustic Tour in May/June 2017.

In June 2016, Davies co-wrote and played on EP ONE with long-term collaborator Paul Draper, as well as featuring on guest vocals on the song "No Ideas" with Steven Wilson. She also co-wrote and performs on 2 tracks on the follow-up release, EP TWO, released in November 2016.

In 2017, Davies co-wrote and engineered five tracks on long-term collaborator Paul Draper's debut solo album Spooky Action. She performed with Draper on his 6-date UK tour in September 2017 and appears on keyboards and vocals on the live album Spooky Action: Live at the Scala.

The Anchoress appeared as a guest vocalist on the March 2017 limited 7" vinyl release of "Fend For Yourself" by the band the Pineapple Thief.

Davies is also a member of the Dark Flowers "super-group". The project was started by songwriter and producer Paul Statham in 2009. She appears alongside vocalists Jim Kerr, Kate Havnevik, Dot Allison, Peter Murphy, Shelly Poole, Helicopter Girl and Remi Roughe. In an interview with Clash, Davies said "It’s basically a project put together by a guy called Paul Statham who’s a songwriter/producer and he had this idea to make a dark country record, kind of like the '‘Paris/Texas'’ soundtrack."

In 2018, she duetted with Manic Street Preachers on their song "Dylan & Caitlin", released as a single and on their album Resistance is Futile, as well as appearing on the Simple Minds album Walk Between Worlds. In October of the same year she appeared as a co-host on the BBC Radio 6 Music show about the Beatles' White Album, alongside Martin Freeman and John Simm.

In 2020, she released two singles under her own name with former Suede and McAlmont & Butler guitarist Bernard Butler titled "The Breakdown" and "Sabotage (Looks So Easy)". On July 22 in NME they announced the release date of their collaborative album In Memory Of My Feelings via Needle Mythology.

In June 2022 Davies released the collaborative single "Human Reciprocator" with Band Spectra which was described as “delving into the discontent, disillusionment, and anger over the current political landscape in the UK”.

In November 2022, Davies was granted a six-month stalking protection order against longtime collaborator Paul Draper. The former Mansun lead singer was accused of stalking Davies and sending “abusive and sexually orientated” messages.

In June 2023 The Anchoress joined the Manic Street Preachers on stage at the Glastonbury Festival to perform "Your Love Alone Is Not Enough" and "This Is Yesterday".

== Writing ==
Davies has a PhD in literature and queer theory from University College London, and has published a book titled Whitman's Queer Children about epic poetry through Bloomsbury Publishing.

Davies has written about film-maker David Lynch for the NME, and has interviewed Tori Amos and Manic Street Preachers for Drowned in Sound.

== Discography ==
=== Studio albums ===
- Confessions of a Romance Novelist (2016)
- The Art of Losing (2021)
- Versions (cover album) (2023)
- As We Once Were (2026)

=== Cover albums ===
- Versions (2023)

=== Live albums ===
- Live at the London Palladium (2020)

=== Singles and EPs ===
- "What Goes Around" – Too Pure Singles Club release, 7" (2014)
- One for Sorrow – Hiraeth Records, 12" EP (2014)
- What Goes Around – EP (2015)
- Doesn't Kill You – EP (2016)
- You and Only You – EP (2016)
- Reprise 2: The Covers Collection – bandcamp, EP (2020)

=== Collaborations ===
- "Dylan & Caitlin" - on the Manic Street Preachers album Resistance Is Futile (2018)
- In Memory of My Feelings (2020) with Bernard Butler (under her birth name)

=== Live performances ===
- The Anchoress performed alongside the Manic Street Preachers at the Eden Project and Glastonbury the songs "Little Baby Nothing" (originally featuring Traci Lords, from the album Generation Terrorists), and "Your Love Alone Is Not Enough" (originally featuring Nina Persson from the Cardigans, from the album Send Away the Tigers)

== Awards and accolades ==
Davies has been recognised several times by the music industry for her songwriting and production work over the years.

Year	Award	Category	Result
2016	HMV Welsh Album of the Year	Confessions of a Romance Novelist	Won
2016	PROG Awards	Best Newcomer	Won
2016	Welsh Music Prize	Confessions of a Romance Novelist	Nominated
2019	PRS Writer/Producer Award	---	Won
2021	PROG Awards	Album of the Year (The Art of Losing)	Won
2021	Welsh Music Prize	The Art of Losing	Nominated
2022	Music Producers Guild	Self-Producing Artist of the Year	Nominated
2023	Music Producers Guild	Self-Producing Artist of the Year	Nominated
2024	Music Producers Guild	Self-Producing Artist of the Year	Nominated
