= The Far Field (poetry collection) =

1964 poetry collection by Theodore Roethke

The Far Field is a 1964 poetry collection by Theodore Roethke, and the poem for which it was named. It was Roethke's final collection, published after his death in 1963.

The book is divided into four sections: "North American Sequence", "Love Poems", "Mixed Sequence", and "Sequence, Sometimes Metaphysical". The Far Field contains several of Roethke's best known works, including the title poem "The Far Field", "Meditation at Oyster River", "Journey to the Interior", and "The Rose". It received the National Book Award for Poetry in 1965.
