= The Waking =

1953 poem by Theodore Roethke

"The Waking" is a poem written by Theodore Roethke in 1953 in the form of a villanelle. It comments on the unknowable with a contemplative tone. It also has been interpreted as comparing life to waking and death to sleeping.

== In popular culture ==
- The poem appears as an object in Kurt Vonnegut's novel Slaughterhouse-Five.
- An excerpt of the poem also appears at the beginning of Dean Koontz's novel Odd Hours.
- Kurt Elling sings the poem on his 2007 album Nightmoves.
- Quoted by the psycho cop in Stephen King's novel Desperation.
- Quoted in Dana Simpson's "Ozy and Millie."
- Quoted in John Le Carré's The Russia House
