= Mad Girl's Love Song =

Poem

"Mad Girl's Love Song" is a poem written by Sylvia Plath in villanelle form that was published in the August 1953 issue of Mademoiselle, a New York based magazine geared toward young women. The poem explores a young woman's struggle between memory and madness. She wrote this poem as a third-year undergraduate at Smith College and described it as being one of her favorite poems that she had written. However, the poem was never republished or found in any of Plath's later collections during her lifetime. After her suicide, "Mad Girl's Love Song" appeared in the afterword of the reprint of The Bell Jar.

== Summary ==
“Mad Girl's Love Song” is a poem by Sylvia Plath that explores love, heartbreak, and delusion. It follows the thought process of the speaker reflecting on a lost love, and struggling to decide whether the memories and feelings associated with the love were real or imagined. The speaker balances imaginative imagery with more realistic seeming memories, she explains that she once knew her lover's name and that he'd promised to return to her, but had not returned. At the end of the poem, the speaker compares her lover to a Thunderbird, which is a mythological bird that comes back every spring. The speaker says she wished her lover was a thunderbird, a final implication that he never returned to her.

== Form ==
The poem is written in the villanelle or villanesque form, which contains nineteen lines. These lines consist of five tercets and a quatrain at the end. Two lines of the opening tercet, the first and the third, are known as refrains and are repeated alternately throughout the poem as the final lines of the following tercets. In this poem, the refrains are the lines, "I think I made you up inside my head" and "I shut my eyes and all the world drops dead".

== Literary devices ==
Plath uses personification in "Mad Girl's Love Song", giving the stars the ability to "waltz" and darkness the ability to "gallop". Plath uses anaphora, repeating the pronoun "I" at the beginning of 13 of the 19 lines within the poem. The continued recurrent imagery of isolation and darkness juxtaposed with fiery and loud imagery also continues the theme of uncertainty as to the speaker's mental state and hold on reality.

== Interpretations ==
=== Psychobiographical criticism ===
According to psychobiographical critics Daghir and Al Masudi, "Mad Girl's Love Song" uses the recurring themes of darkness, light, and dreams to consider the divides between three realities: life, death, and dreams. As the speaker closes her eyes and experiences darkness the world is said to "drop dead", while opening eyes is a rebirth. Psychobiographical criticism points to the explanation that this exploration between life and death that Plath writes about was influenced by the death of her father, whose loss was traumatic to Plath. She expressed in her journals that she chased after men whom reminded her of her father as well as had dissociative episodes remembering him.

The same psychobiographical schema notes that while writing "Mad Girl's Love Song" Plath continued to struggle with nightmares and dissociative episodes that made her doubt her reality, possibly informing the writing of her poem where the speaker started in control of the three realities: day dreaming about a lover, shutting her eyes to welcome death, and opening them up in a form of rebirth, however at the end of the poem the speaker loses control of the three realities. It becomes impossible to know if the speaker's lover truly said he would return or not as stated in the fifth stanza, as the dream-reality blends with real life. The struggle to discern what is reality and what is not is also seen in the title, referencing a girl rather than a woman, implying that the boy the woman dreams of she knew as a girl, but is now considering if he was real at all.

=== Feminist criticism ===
"Mad Girl's Love Song" was published in Mademoiselle, a New York based magazine geared toward young women, and much of Plath's writings reference feminism, including "Mad Girl's Love Song", which inspired writings on the importance of daydreaming and whimsical thinking in young girls. Additionally, Plath's critics inspired many defenses for young girls who idealize men and relationships, as Plath's life was hugely affected by the men in her life, namely her father, husband, and sexual relationships she explored during her undergraduate years. "Mad Girl's Love Song" served as a catalyst for authors Greenberg and Klaver to publish a feminist criticism of the attack on Sylvia Plath's legitimacy and prestige, which they cite as having occurred since the publication of "Mad Girl's Love Song" and long after Plath's death. Klaver challenges the phenomena of "aging-out" of Plath's poetry, arguing that it is deeply rooted sexism that pushes Plath and her poetic works from fame. Greenberg echoes this sentiment, noting that Plath was not nuanced in referencing mental illness and heartbreak within her poetry, namely "Mad Girl's Love Song", but because she was a young woman she was labeled as mentally ill or crazed young girl rather than celebrated as an iconic poet.
