= The Prophecy of Dante =

1821 poem by Lord Byron

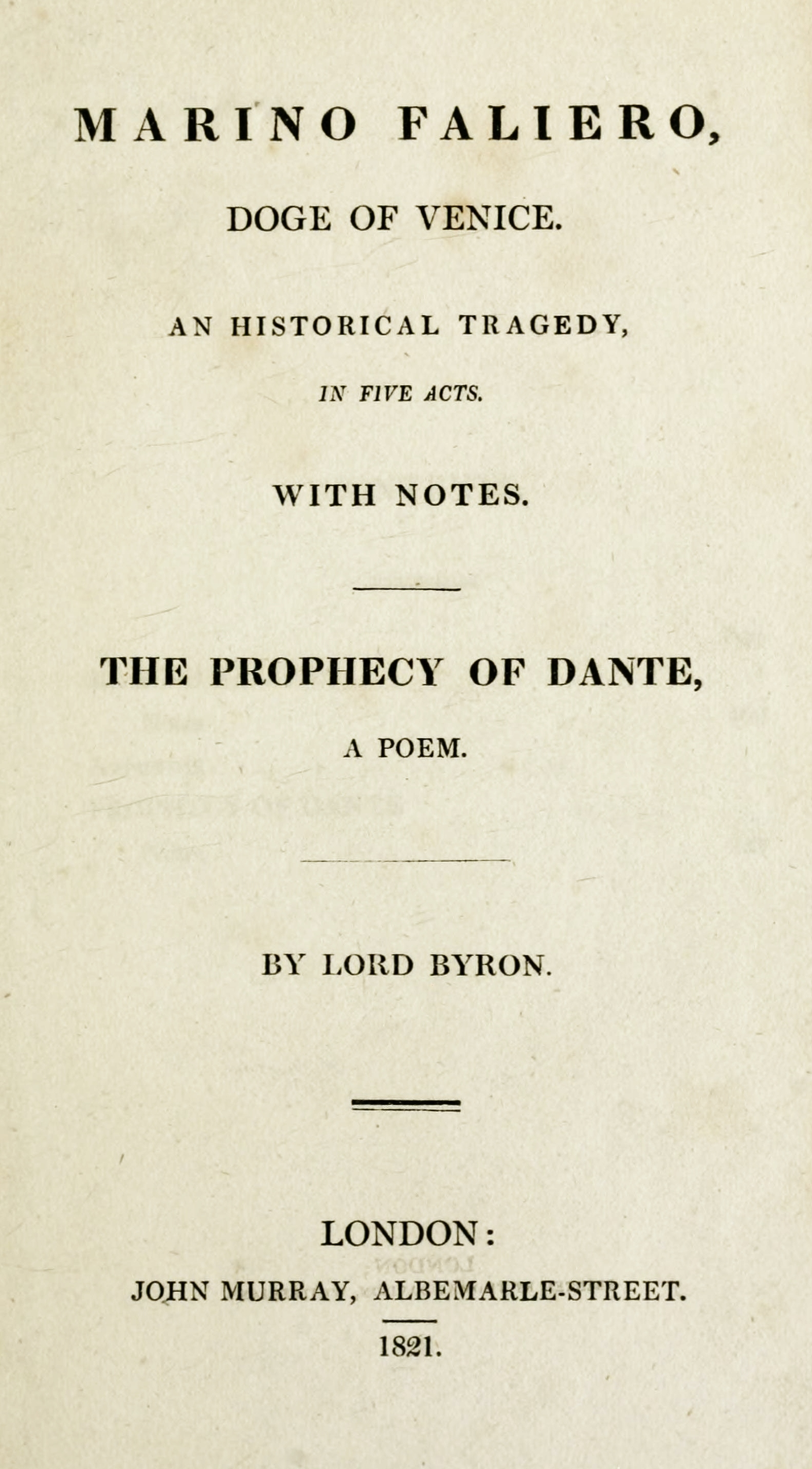
1821 first edition with Marino Faliero.

The Prophecy of Dante is a tale in verse by Lord Byron published in 1821 (see 1821 in poetry). Written at Ravenna in June 1819, the author dedicated it to the Countess Guiccioli.

The poem was published in 1821 in London by John Murray with Marino Faliero. The poem was published as a standalone work in the U.S. by M. Carey in Philadelphia the same year.

The work pictures Dante Alighieri prophesying the future of Italy from his tomb in Ravenna, Italy, which Byron had visited. Byron was living in Ravenna at the time. The work is written in terza rima, a three-line rhyme structure. It is a tribute to Dante's Divine Comedy.

== Reception ==
The work was positively reviewed by Francis Jeffrey in the 1821 Edinburgh Review: “It is a very grand, fervid, turbulent, and somewhat mystical composition, full of the highest sentiment and the highest poetry;... but disfigured by many faults of precipitation, and overclouded with many obscurities. Its great fault with common readers will be that it is not sufficiently intelligible... It is, however, beyond all question, a work of a man of great genius.”

== Sources ==
- Jeffrey, Francis. Review: Marino Faliero, Edinburgh Review, July, 1821, vol. 35, p. 285.
- Taylor, Beverly. "Byron's Use of Dante in The Prophecy of Dante." Keats-Shelley Journal, Vol. 28 (1979), pp. 102-119.
- Mills, Chester H. "The Prophecy of Dante". The Byron Journal, Number 8, 1 January 1980. https://doi.org/10.3828/bj.1980.10
- Shilstone, Frederick W. "Byron, Dante, and Don Juan's Descent to English Society." The Comparatist, Vol. 8 (MAY, 1984), pp. 43-55.
- Tinkler-Villani, V. (2006). "Presence and absence in Byron's 𝘛𝘩𝘦 𝘗𝘳𝘰𝘱𝘩𝘦𝘤𝘺 𝘰𝘧 𝘋𝘢𝘯𝘵𝘦". Journal of Anglo-Italian Studies, 8, 47-57.
