= Robert Sund =

American poet

- Born: November 29, 1929; Olympia, Washington
- Died: September 29, 2001 (aged 71); Anacortes, Washington
- Education: University of Washington
- Occupation: Poet

Robert Sund (November 11, 1929 – September 29, 2001) was an American poet in the Pacific Northwest.

Sund studied under Theodore Roethke at the University of Washington.

He was at times a resident at the Fishtown artist community on the Skagit River near the town of La Conner.
