= Terza rima =

Poetic form

Terza rima (/ˌtɛərtsə ˈriːmə/, also US: /ˌtɜːr-/, Italian: [ˈtɛrtsa ˈriːma]; lit. 'third rhyme') is a rhyming verse form, in which the poem, or each poem-section, consists of tercets (three-line stanzas) with an interlocking three-line rhyme scheme: The last word of the second line in one tercet provides the rhyme for the first and third lines in the tercet that follows ($\mathrm{ABA \,\, BCB \,\, CDC}$). The poem or poem-section may have any number of lines (not divisible by 3), but it ends with either a single line or a couplet, which repeats the rhyme of the middle line of the previous tercet ($\mathrm{YZY \,\, Z}$ or $\mathrm{YZY \,\, ZZ}$).

Terza rima was invented early in the fourteenth century by the Italian poet Dante Alighieri for his narrative poem the Divine Comedy, which he set in hendecasyllabic lines. In English, poets often use iambic pentameter. Terza rima is a challenging form for a poet, and it did not become common in the century following its invention. The form is especially challenging in languages that are inherently less rich in rhymes than Italian.

Terza rima can give to the verse the effect of rhymes surging the narrative forward. It can also give a sense of continuity to the verse — the rhymes are woven together, and a reading of a canto cannot be stopped without the sense of something (the rhyme scheme) broken or unfinished. The rhymes of terza rima add the effect of echo and expectation — as a line is read there is the sense it will soon be followed by a rhyme that will complete the rhyme scheme. Terza rima can lend a sense of strength and solidity to the story or the poem — each tercet, though brief, has enough length to contain a complete thought or expression, that can be considered independently. Tercets are like the building blocks of the poem or canto, and the interwoven rhyme serves as the cement that binds them together.

== History ==
The first use of terza rima is in Dante's Divine Comedy, completed in 1320. In creating the form, Dante may have been influenced by the sirventes, a lyric poetry form used by the Provençal troubadours. Inspired by Dante, other Italian poets, including Petrarch and Boccaccio, began using the form.

== English-language translations and poems ==
Translators and poets who write in English and use terza rima are often interested in exploring modifications and variations of the rhyme. The first occurrence of Dante’s terza rima rhyme scheme in English is found in parts II and III of Geoffrey Chaucer's short poem "Complaint to His Lady". Terza rima has been used by Thomas Wyatt, John Milton, Lord Byron (in The Prophecy of Dante) and Percy Bysshe Shelley (in his "Ode to the West Wind" and The Triumph of Life). Thomas Hardy also used a heavily modified version of the form in "Friends Beyond," which contains irregular line lengths and an inconsistent rhyme scheme, to interlink the characters and continue the flow of the poem. A more conventional example can be seen in Hardy's "In Front of the Landscape," a later effort. Notwithstanding its relative formal fidelity, the poem does not adhere to iambic pentameter.

20th-century poets who have employed variations of the form include W. H. Auden ("The Sea and the Mirror"), T. S. Eliot ("Little Gidding"), Robert Frost ("Acquainted with the Night"), Elizabeth Jennings, Philip Larkin, Archibald MacLeish ("The Conquistador", winner of the Pulitzer Prize 1932), James Merrill, Jacqueline Osherow, Sylvia Plath ("The Sow"), Adrienne Rich ("Terza Rima"), Gjertrud Schnackenberg, Clark Ashton Smith, Derek Walcott, Richard Wilbur and William Carlos Williams ("The Yachts"). A 21st-century example that adhere's closely to Dante's terza rima is David Ives' The Phobia Clinic, which the author describes as a "philosophical horror novelette in verse using Dante's Inferno as its model". Edward Lowbury's adaptation of the form to six-syllable lines has been named piccola terza rima.

English versions of the Divine Comedy are often set in iambic pentameter. Examples of English translations in the terza rima form include Robert Pinsky's version of the first book, Inferno, and Laurence Binyon's, Dorothy L. Sayers's and Peter Dale's versions of the entire work.

== Examples ==
The opening lines of the Divine Comedy:

Nel mezzo del cammin di nostra vita	$\mathrm{A}$
mi ritrovai per una selva oscura	$\mathrm{B}$
ché la diritta via era smarrita.	$\mathrm{A}$
Ahi quanto a dir qual era è cosa dura	$\mathrm{B}$
esta selva selvaggia e aspra e forte	$\mathrm{C}$
che nel pensier rinnova la paura!	$\mathrm{B}$
Tant'è amara che poco è più morte;	$\mathrm{C}$
ma per trattar del ben ch'i' vi trovai,	$\mathrm{D}$
dirò de l'altre cose ch'i' v'ho scorte.	$\mathrm{C}$
Io non so ben ridir com'i' v'intrai,	$\mathrm{D}$
tant'era pien di sonno a quel punto	$\mathrm{E}$
che la verace via abbandonai.	$\mathrm{D}$
