= Jean Passerat =

French poet and satirist (1534–1602)

- Born: 18 October 1534; Troyes
- Died: 14 September 1602 (aged 67)
- Occupations: Satirist, poet

Jean Passerat (18 October 1534 – 14 September 1602) was a 16th-century French political satirist and poet.

== Life ==
Passerat was born at Troyes, on 18 October 1534. He studied at the University of Paris, and is said to have had some curious adventures at one time working in a mine. He was, however, a scholar by natural taste, and became eventually a teacher at the Collège de Plessis, and on the death of Ramus was made professor of Latin in 1572 in the Collège de France.

In the meanwhile Passerat had studied law, and had composed much agreeable poetry in the Pléiade style, the best pieces being his short ode Du Premier jour de mai and the villanelle whose first line is J'ay perdu ma tourterelle. The nonce form of the latter poem was eventually imitated by many nineteenth- and twentieth-century poets. Passerat's exact share in the Satire Ménippée (Tours, 1594), the great manifesto of the politique or Moderate Royalist party when it had declared itself for Henry of Navarre, is unknown; but it is agreed that he wrote most of the verse, and the harangue of the guerrilla chief Rieux is sometimes attributed to him. The famous Sur la journée de Senlis, which commends the duc d'Aumale's ability in running away, is one of the most celebrated political songs in French. Towards the end of his life Passerat became blind. He died in Paris on 14 September 1602.

== Work ==
Passerat published "Nihil", a poem in Latin in 1588.

=== "Villanelle" ===
Villanelle

I'ay perdu ma Tourterelle:
Eft-ce point celle que i'oy?
Ie veus aller aprés elle.

Tu regretes ta femelle,
Helas! außi fai-ie moy,
I'ay perdu ma Tourterelle.

Si ton Amour eft fidelle,
Außi est ferme ma foy,
Ie veus aller aprés elle.

Ta plainte fe renouuelle;
Toufiours plaindre ie me doy:
I'ay perdu ma Tourterelle.

En ne voyant plus la belle
Plus rien de beau ie ne voy:
Ie veus aller aprés elle.

Mort, que tant de fois i'appelle,
Pren ce qui fe donne à toy:
I'ay perdu ma Tourterelle,
Ie veus aller aprés ell.

Jean Passerat. Recueil des oeuvres poétiques de Ian Passerat augmenté de plus de la moitié, outre les précédentes impressions. [Ed. Jean de Rougevalet.] Paris: Morel, 1606. 344-5.
