= Theodore Roethke =

American poet (1908–1963)

- Born: Theodore Huebner Roethke; May 25, 1908; Saginaw, Michigan, U.S.
- Died: August 1, 1963 (aged 55); Bainbridge Island, Washington, U.S.
- Education: University of Michigan (BA, MA); Harvard University
- Occupations: Teacher; poet; author
- Writing career
- Genre: American poetry
- Notable works: The Waking, The Lost Son, The Far Field, Words for the Wind
- Notable awards: Pulitzer Prize, National Book Award

Theodore Huebner Roethke (/ˈrɛtki/ RET-kee; May 25, 1908 – August 1, 1963) was an American poet. He is regarded as one of the most accomplished and influential poets of his generation, having won the Pulitzer Prize for Poetry in 1954 for his book The Waking, and the annual National Book Award for Poetry on two occasions: in 1959 for Words for the Wind, and posthumously in 1965 for The Far Field. His work was characterized by a willingness to engage deeply with a multifaceted introspection, and his style was overtly rhythmic, with a skilful use of natural imagery. Roethke's mastery of both free verse and fixed forms was complemented by an intense lyrical quality that drew "from the natural world in all its mystery and fierce beauty."

Roethke was praised by former U.S. Poet Laureate and author James Dickey as "in my opinion the greatest poet this country has yet produced." He was also a respected poetry teacher, and taught at the University of Washington for fifteen years. His students from that period won two Pulitzer Prizes for Poetry and two others were nominated for the award. "He was probably the best poetry-writing teacher ever," said poet Richard Hugo, who studied under Roethke.

== Biography ==
Roethke was born on May 25, 1908, in Saginaw, Michigan, and grew up on the west side of the Saginaw River. His father, Otto, was a German immigrant, a florist who owned several large local greenhouses, along with his brother (Theodore's uncle). Much of Theodore's childhood was spent in these greenhouses, as reflected by the use of natural images in his poetry. In early 1923 when Roethke was 14 years old, his uncle died by suicide and his father died of cancer. Roethke noted that these events affected him deeply and influenced his work.

Roethke attended the University of Michigan, earning a B.A. magna cum laude and Phi Beta Kappa in 1929. He continued on at Michigan to receive an M.A. in English in 1936. He briefly attended the University of Michigan School of Law before resuming his graduate studies at Harvard University, where he studied under the poet Robert Hillyer. Abandoning graduate study because of the Great Depression, he taught English at several universities, including Michigan State University, Lafayette College, Pennsylvania State University, and Bennington College.

In 1940, he was expelled from his position at Lafayette and he returned to Michigan. Prior to his return, he had an affair with established poet and critic Louise Bogan, one of his strongest early supporters. While teaching at Michigan State University in East Lansing, he began to suffer from manic depression, which fueled his poetic impetus. His last teaching position was at the University of Washington, leading to an association with the poets of the American Northwest.

Some of his students included James Wright, Judith Jones, Carolyn Kizer, Tess Gallagher, Jack Gilbert, Richard Hugo, Robert Sund, and David Wagoner. The highly introspective nature of Roethke's work greatly influenced the poet Sylvia Plath. So influential was Roethke's poetry on Plath's mature poetry that when she submitted "Poem for a Birthday" to Poetry magazine, it was turned down because it displayed "too imposing a debt to Roethke."

In 1952, Roethke received a Ford Foundation grant to "expand on his knowledge of philosophy and theology", and spent most of his time from June 1952 to September 1953 reading primarily existential works. Among the philosophers and theologians he read were Sören Kierkegaard, Evelyn Underhill, Meister Eckhart, Paul Tillich, Jacob Boehme, and Martin Buber.

In 1953, Roethke married Beatrice O'Connell, a former student. Roethke was a heavy drinker and susceptible to bouts of mental illness, something not uncommon among American poets of his generation. He did not initially inform O'Connell of his repeated episodes of mania and depression, yet she remained dedicated to him and his work. She ensured the posthumous publication of his final volume of poetry, The Far Field, as well as a book of his collected children's verse, Dirty Dinky and Other Creatures, in 1973. From 1955 to 1956 he spent one year in Italy on a scholarship of the U.S.-Italy Fulbright Commission.

In 1961, "The Return" was featured on George Abbe's album Anthology of Contemporary American Poetry on Folkways Records. The following year, Roethke released his own album on the label entitled, Words for the Wind: Poems of Theodore Roethke.

In 1961, Roethke was chosen as one of 50 outstanding Americans of meritorious performance in the fields of endeavor, to be Guest of Honor to the first annual Banquet of the Golden Plate in Monterey, California. This was awarded by vote of the National Panel of Distinguished Americans of the Academy of Achievement.

He suffered a heart attack in his friend S. Rasnics' swimming pool in 1963 and died on August 1, 1963, on Bainbridge Island, Washington, aged 55. The pool was later filled in and is now a zen rock garden open to the public at the Bloedel Reserve, a 150-acre (60 hectare) former private estate. There is no marker to indicate that the rock garden was the site of Roethke's death.

== Commemoration ==
There is a sign that commemorates his boyhood home and burial in Saginaw, Michigan. The historical marker notes in part:

Theodore Roethke (1908–1963) wrote of his poetry: The greenhouse "is my symbol for the whole of life, a womb, a heaven-on-earth." Roethke drew inspiration from his childhood experiences of working in his family's Saginaw floral company. Beginning in 1941 with Open House, the distinguished poet and teacher published extensively, receiving a Pulitzer Prize for poetry and two National Book Awards among an array of honors. In 1959 Pennsylvania University awarded him the Bollingen Prize. Roethke taught at Michigan State College, (present-day Michigan State University) and at colleges in Pennsylvania and Vermont, before joining the faculty of the University of Washington at Seattle in 1947. Roethke died in Washington in 1963. His remains are interred in Saginaw's Oakwood Cemetery.

The Friends of Theodore Roethke Foundation maintains his birthplace at 1805 Gratiot in Saginaw as a museum.

Roethke Auditorium (Kane Hall 130) at the University of Washington is named in his honor.

In 1995, the Seattle alley between Seventh and Eighth Avenues N.E. running from N.E. 45th Street to N.E. 47th Street was named Roethke Mews in his honor. It adjoins the Blue Moon Tavern, one of Roethke's haunts.

In 2016, the Theodore Roethke Home museum announced their "quest to find as many as possible of the 1,000 hand-numbered copies of [...] Roethke's debut collection, Open House, to celebrate the 75th anniversary of the work's publication."

== Critical responses ==
Two-time US Poet Laureate Stanley Kunitz said of Roethke, "The poet of my generation who meant most to me, in his person and in his art, was Theodore Roethke."

In a Spring 1976 interview in the Paris Review (No. 65), James Dickey defended his choice of Roethke as the greatest of all American poets. Dickey states: "I don't see anyone else that has the kind of deep, gut vitality that Roethke's got. Whitman was a great poet, but he's no competition for Roethke."

In his book The Western Canon; The Books and School of the Age, (1994) Yale literary critic Harold Bloom cites two Roethke books, Collected Poems and Straw for The Fire, on his list of essential writers and books. Bloom also groups Roethke with Elizabeth Bishop and Robert Penn Warren as the most accomplished among the "middle generation" of American poets.

In her 2006 book, "Break, Blow, Burn: Forty-three of the World's Best Poems," critic Camille Paglia includes three Roethke poems, more than any other 20th-century writer cited in the book.

The Poetry Foundation entry on Roethke notes early reviews of his work and Roethke's response to that early criticism:

W. H. Auden called [Roethke's first book] Open House "completely successful." In another review of the book, Elizabeth Drew felt "his poems have a controlled grace of movement and his images the utmost precision; while in the expression of a kind of gnomic wisdom which is peculiar to him as he attains an austerity of contemplation and a pared, spare strictness of language very unusual in poets of today." Roethke kept both Auden's and Drew's reviews, along with other favorable reactions to his work. As he remained sensitive to how peers and others he respected should view his poetry, so too did he remain sensitive to his introspective drives as the source of his creativity. Understandably, critics picked up on the self as the predominant preoccupation in Roethke's poems.

Roethke's breakthrough book, The Lost Son and Other Poems, also won him considerable praise. For instance, Michael Harrington felt Roethke "found his own voice and central themes in The Lost Son" and Stanley Kunitz saw a "confirmation that he was in full possession of his art and of his vision." In Against Oblivion, an examination of forty-five twentieth century poets, the critic Ian Hamilton also praised this book, writing, "In Roethke's second book, The Lost Son, there are several of these greenhouse poems and they are among the best things he wrote; convincing and exact, and rich in loamy detail." Michael O'Sullivan points to the phrase "uncertain congress of stinks", from the greenhouse poem "Root Cellar", as Roethke's insistence on the ambiguous processes of the animal and vegetable world, processes that cannot be reduced to growth and decay alone.

In addition to the well-known greenhouse poems, the Poetry Foundation notes that Roethke also won praise "for his love poems which first appeared in The Waking and earned their own section in the new book and 'were a distinct departure from the painful excavations of the monologues and in some respects a return to the strict stanzaic forms of the earliest work,' [according to the poet] Stanley Kunitz. [The critic] Ralph Mills described 'the amatory verse' as a blend of 'consideration of self with qualities of eroticism and sensuality; but more important, the poems introduce and maintain a fascination with something beyond the self, that is, with the figure of the other, or the beloved woman.'"

In reviewing his posthumously published Collected Poems in 1966, Karl Malkoff of The Sewanee Review wrote:

Though not definitive, Roethke: Collected Poems is a major book of poetry. It reveals the full extent of Roethke's achievement: his ability to perceive reality in terms of the tensions between inner and outer worlds, and to find a meaningful system of metaphor with which to communicate this perception.... It also points up his weaknesses: the derivative quality of his less successful verse, the limited areas of concern in even his best poems. The balance, it seems to me, is in Roethke's favor.... He is one of our finest poets, a human poet in a world that threatens to turn man into an object.

In 1967 Roethke's Collected Poems topped the lists of two of the three Pulitzer Prize poetry voters; Phyllis McGinley and Louis Simpson. However the group's chairman, Richard Eberhart, lobbied against Roethke on the grounds that the award should go to a living poet; it would have been Roethke's second Pulitzer Prize.

== Bibliography ==
- Open House (1941)
- The Lost Son and Other Poems (1948)
- Praise to the End! (1951)
- The Waking (1953)
- Words for the Wind (1958)
- I Am! Says the Lamb (1961)
- Sequence, Sometimes Metaphysical (1963)
- Party at the Zoo (1963) (A Modern Masters Book for Children, illustrated by Al Swiller)
- The Far Field (1964)
- Dirty Dinky and Other Creatures: Poems for Children (1973)
- On Poetry and Craft: Selected Prose and Craft of Theodore Roethke (2001)
- Straw for the Fire: From the Notebooks of Theodore Roethke, 1943–63 (1972; 2006) (selected and arranged by David Wagoner)

== Film and theatre ==
Film

- In a Dark Time: A Film About Theodore Roethke (1964). Directed by Dan Myers for McGraw-Hill Films. 25:38 min.
- I Remember Theodore Roethke (2005). Produced and edited by Jean Walkinshaw. SCCtv (Seattle Community Colleges Television). 30 min.

Theatre

- First Class: A Play About Theodore Roethke (2007). Written by David Wagoner.
