= Glossary of literary terms =

This glossary of literary terms is a list of definitions of terms and concepts used in the discussion, classification, analysis, and criticism of all types of literature, such as poetry, novels, and picture books, as well as of grammar, syntax, and language techniques. For a more complete glossary of terms relating to poetry in particular, see Glossary of poetry terms.

== A ==
abecedarius
A special type of acrostic in which the first letter of every word, strophe or verse follows the order of the alphabet.
acatalexis
An acatalectic line of verse is one having the metrically complete number of syllables in the final foot.
accent
Any noun used to describe the stress put on a certain syllable while speaking a word. For example, there has been disagreement over the pronunciation of "Abora" in line 41 of "Kubla Khan" by Samuel Taylor Coleridge. According to Herbert Tucker of the website "For Better For Verse", the accent is on the first and last syllable of the word, making its pronunciation: AborA.
accentual verse
Accentual verse is common in children's poetry. Nursery rhymes and the less well-known skipping-rope rhymes are the most common form of accentual verse in the English language.
acrostic
A poem or other form of writing in which the first letter, syllable, or word of each line, paragraph, or other recurring feature in the text spells out a word or a message. Example: An Acrostic (1829) by Edgar Allan Poe.
act
An act is a major division of a theatre work, including a play, film, opera, or musical theatre, consisting of one or more scenes.
adage
An adage expresses a well-known and simple truth in a few words. (Similar to aphorism and proverb.)
adjective
Any word or phrase which modifies a noun or pronoun, grammatically added to describe, identify, or quantify the related noun or pronoun.
adverb
A descriptive word used to modify a verb, adjective, or another adverb. Typically ending in -ly, adverbs answer the questions when, how, and how many times.
aisling
A poetic genre based on dreams and visions that developed during the 17th and 18th centuries in Irish-language poetry.
allegory
A type of writing in which the settings, characters, and events stand for other specific people, events, or ideas.
alliteration
Repetition of the initial sounds of words, as in "Peter Piper picked a peck of pickled peppers".
allusion
A figure of speech that makes a reference to or a representation of people, places, events, literary works, myths, or works of art, either directly or by implication.
anachronism
The erroneous use of an object, event, idea, or word that does not belong to the same time period as its context.
anacrusis
In poetry, a set of non-metrical syllables at the beginning of a verse used as a prelude to the metrical line.
anadiplosis
The repetition of the last word of one clause at the beginning of the following clause to gain a special effect; e.g. "Labour and care are rewarded with success, success produces confidence, confidence relaxes industry, and negligence ruins the reputation which diligence had raised." (The Rambler No. 21, Samuel Johnson)
anagnorisis
The point in a plot at which a character recognizes the true state of affairs.
analepsis
An interjected scene that takes the narrative back in time from the current point the story has reached.
analogue
analogy
A comparison between two things that are otherwise unlike.
anapest
A version of the foot in poetry in which the first two syllables of a line are unstressed, followed by a stressed syllable; e.g. intercept (the syllables in and ter are unstressed and followed by cept, which is stressed).
anaphora
anastrophe
anecdote
A short account of a particular incident or event, especially of an interesting or amusing nature.
annals
annotation
A textual comment in a book or other piece of writing. Annotations often take the form of a reader's comments handwritten in the margin, hence the term marginalia, or of printed explanatory notes provided by an editor. See also adversaria.
antagonist
The adversary of the hero or protagonist of a drama or other literary work; e.g. Iago is the antagonist in William Shakespeare's Othello.
antanaclasis
antecedent
A word or phrase referred to by any relative pronoun.
antepenult
anthology
anticlimax
antihero
antimasque
anti-romance
antimetabole
antinovel
antistrophe
antithesis
antithetical couplet
antonym
aphorism
apocope
Apollonian and Dionysian
apologue
apology
apothegm

A terse, pithy saying, akin to a proverb, maxim, or aphorism.
aposiopesis
A rhetorical device in which speech is broken off abruptly and the sentence is left unfinished.
apostrophe
A figure of speech in which a speaker breaks off from addressing the audience (e.g., in a play) and directs speech to a third party such as an opposing litigant or some other individual, sometimes absent from the scene.
apron stage
Arcadia
archaism
archetype
Any story element (e.g. idea, symbol, pattern, or character-type) that appears repeatedly in stories across time and space.
aristeia
argument
arsis and thesis
asemic writing
aside
assonance
astrophic
(of one or more stanzas) Having no particular pattern.
asyndeton
The omission of conjunctions between successive clauses. An example is when John F. Kennedy said on January 20, 1961, "...that we shall pay any price, bear any burden, meet any hardship, support any friend, oppose any foe to assure the survival and the success of liberty."
aubade
(French: "dawn song") A monologue which dramatically expresses the regret of parting lovers at daybreak.
audience
autobiography
autoclesis
A rhetorical device by which an idea is introduced in negative terms in order to call attention to it and arouse curiosity.
autotelic
avant-garde

== B ==
ballad
ballade
ballad stanza
bard
A distinguished poet, especially one serving in an official capacity whose task it was, in many cultures of Celtic origin, to celebrate national events, particularly heroic actions and military victories.
bathos
Bathos refers to rhetorical anticlimax—an abrupt transition from a lofty style or grand topic to a common or vulgar one—occurring either accidentally (through artistic ineptitude) or intentionally (for comic effect).
beast fable
An "animal tale" or "beast fable" generally consists of a short story or poem in which animals talk. It is a traditional form of allegorical writing.
beast poetry
belles-lettres
bestiary
A medieval didactic genre in prose or verse in which the behavior of animals (used as symbolic types) points a moral.
beta reader
bibliography
Bildungsroman
A story that follows the psychological and moral maturation of the protagonist or main character from childhood to adulthood. It is a type of coming-of-age story.
biography
blank verse
Verse written in iambic pentameter without rhyme.
boulevard theatre
bourgeois tragedy
bouts-rimés
A versifying game originating in 17th-century France in which the idea was, given certain rhymes, to compose lines for them and make up a poem which sounded natural.
brachiology
Terse and condensed expression, characteristic of the heroic couplet. See also asyndeton.
breviloquence
burlesque
burletta
Burns stanza
Byronic hero
A type of character in a dramatic work whose defining features derive largely from characters in the writings of English Romantic poet Lord Byron as well as from Byron himself. It is a variant of the archetypal Romantic hero.

== C ==
cadence
In poetry, the rise or fall in pitch of the intonation of the voice, and its modulated inflection with the rise and fall of its sound.
caesura
A break or pause in a line of poetry, dictated by the natural rhythm of the language and/or enforced by punctuation. A line may have more than one caesura, or none at all. If near the beginning of the line, it is called the initial caesura; near the middle, medial; near the end, terminal. An accented or masculine caesura follows an accented syllable, an unaccented or feminine caesura an unaccented syllable. The caesura is used in two essentially contrary ways: to emphasize formality and to stylize; and to slacken the stiffness and tension of formal metrical patterns.
calligram
canon
A body of writings established as authentic. The term often refers to biblical writings which have been accepted as authorized, as opposed to the Apocrypha.
canso
canticle
canto
A subdivision of an epic or narrative poem, comparable to a chapter in a novel.
canzone
An Italian or Provençal form of lyric, consisting of a series of verses in stanza form but without a refrain, and usually written in hendecasyllabic lines with end-rhyme; or more generally, any simple and song-like composition such as a ballad. See also chanson and madrigal.
captivity narrative
caricature
A portrait in literature (as in art) which ridicules a person by exaggerating and distorting their most prominent features and characteristics. Caricatures often evoke genial rather than derisive laughter.
carmen figuratum
carpe diem
catachresis
The misapplication of a word, especially in a mixed metaphor.
catalect
A literary work which is detached (or detachable) from the main body of a writer's work. Compare analect.
catalexis
The omission of the last syllable or syllables in a regular metrical line; often done in trochaic and dactylic verse to avoid monotony.
catastrophe
catharsis
caudate sonnet
cavalier poet
Celtic art
Celtic revival
chain rhyme
chanson de geste
A type of Old French epic poem popular between the 11th and 14th centuries which relates the heroic deeds of Carolingian noblemen and other feudal lords. Such works exhibit a combination of history and legend, and also reflect a definite conception of religious chivalry.
chansonnier
A collection of Provençal troubadour poems in manuscript form.
chant royal
A metrical and rhyming scheme dating to the Middle Ages and related to ballade forms. It consists of five eleven-line stanzas rhyming in the pattern ababccddedE, followed by an envoi rhyming in the pattern ddedE. There is also a refrain (as indicated by the capital letters) at the end of each stanza and including the last line of the envoi. Typically, no rhyme word may be used twice except in the envoi.
chapbook
A form of popular literature sold by pedlars or chapmen, mostly from the 16th to the 18th centuries. Chapbooks consisted of ballads, pamphlets, tracts, nursery rhymes, and fairy stories, and were often illustrated with wood-blocks.
character
characterization
charactonym
Chaucerian stanza
chiasmus
A reversal of grammatical structures in successive phrases or clauses; e.g. "His time a moment, and a point his space." (An Essay on Man, Epistle I, Alexander Pope) The device is related to antithesis.
chivalric romance
choriamb
chronicle
chronicle play
cinquain
A five-line stanza with a variable meter and rhyme scheme, possibly of medieval origin.
classical unities
classicism
classification
clerihew
cliché
An element of an artistic work, saying, or idea that has become overused to the point of losing its original meaning or effect, even to the point of being trite or irritating, especially when at some earlier time it was considered meaningful or novel.
climax
cloak and dagger
close reading
A technique of literary analysis that relies upon detailed, balanced, and rigorous critical examination of a text in order to discover its meanings and to assess its effects.
closed couplet
closet drama
collaborative poetry
colloquialism
comédie larmoyante
comedy
comedy of humors
comedy of intrigue
comedy of manners
comic relief
commedia dell'arte
commedia erudita
common measure
commonplace book
A notebook or journal in which a writer records ideas, themes, quotations, words, and phrases as they occur to them.
conceit
concordance
confessional literature
confidant/confidante
conflict
connotation
consistency
consonance
The close repetition of identical consonant sounds before and after different vowels, e.g. "slip, slop"; "creak, croak"; "black, block". Compare assonance.
contradiction
context
contrast
convention
coup de théâtre
couplet
Two lines with rhyming ends. Shakespeare often used a couplet to end a sonnet.
courtesy book
courtly love
Cowleyan ode
cradle book
See incunabulum.
crisis
That point in a story or play at which tension reaches a maximum and a resolution is imminent. There may be several crises, each preceding a climax.
cross acrostic
crown of sonnets
curtain raiser
curtal sonnet

== D ==
dactyl
dandy
Débat
death poem
decadence
decasyllable
decorum
denotation
The most literal and limited meaning of a word, regardless of what one may feel about it or the suggestions and ideas it connotes (which may be much more affecting than or very different from its literal meaning).
dénouement
The resolution or unravelling of the complications of the plot in a play or story, often following the climax in a final scene or chapter in which mysteries, confusions, and doubtful destinies are clarified. See also catastrophe.
description
deus ex machina
A plot device whereby a seemingly unsolvable problem in a story is suddenly resolved by an unexpected and seemingly unlikely occurrence, typically so much as to seem contrived.
deuteragonist
dialect
dialogic
A work primarily featuring dialogue; a piece of, relating to, or written in dialogue.
dialogue
dibrach
diction

The words selected for use in any oral, written, or literary expression. Diction often centers on opening a great array of lexical possibilities with the connotation of words by maintaining first the denotation of words.
didactic
Intended to teach, instruct, or have a moral lesson for the reader.
digest size
digression
dime novel
diameter
dimeter
A line of verse made up of two feet (two stresses).
dipody
A pair of metrical feet considered as a single unit. Dipodic verse, commonly found in ballads and nursery rhymes, is characterized by the pairing together of feet in which one usually has a stronger stress.
dirge
discourse
dissociation of sensibility
dissonance
distich
distributed stress
dithyramb
diverbium
The spoken dialogue in Roman drama, as distinguished from the canticum, the sung part.
divine afflatus
doggerel
dolce stil nuove
domestic tragedy

A type of tragedy in which the leading characters belong to the middle class rather than to the royal or noble ranks usually represented in tragic drama, and in which the action largely concerns family affairs rather than public matters of state.
donnée
A French word which signifies something "given" in the sense of an idea or notion implanted in the mind or imagination; i.e. the original idea or starting point from which a writer elaborates a complete creative work. It may be a phrase, a conversation, the expression on a person's face, a tune, indeed almost any kind of experience which precipitates a series of thoughts and ideas in the writer's mind.
doppelgänger
double rhyme
drama
dramatic character
dramatic irony
dramatic lyric
dramatic monologue
dramatic proverb
dramatis personæ
Collectively, the characters represented in a play or other dramatic work. This phrase is the conventional heading for a list of characters printed in a theatrical programme or at the beginning of the text.
dramaturgy
dream allegory
dream vision
droll
dumb show
duodecimo
duologue
A conversation between two characters in a play, story, or poem. See also dialogue.
duple meter/duple rhythm
Any poetic meter based on a foot of two syllables (i.e. a duple foot), as opposed to triple meter, in which the predominant foot has three syllables. Most English metrical verse is in duple meter, either iambic or trochaic, and thus displays an alternation of stressed syllables with single unstressed syllables. In the context of classical Greek and Latin poetry, however, the term often refers to verse composed of dipodies.
dystopia
dynamic character
A character who, during the course of a narrative, grows or changes in some significant way. Dynamic characters are therefore not only complex and three-dimensional but also develop as the plot develops. In the Bildungsroman, for example, the growth of the protagonist is coincident with the course of the plot.

== E ==
echo verse
eclogue
ekphrasis
A vivid, graphic, or dramatic written commentary or description of another visual form of art.
electronic literature
Literary works made for digital media, such as hypertext fiction, kinetic poetry or interactive fiction.
elegy
elision
emblem
emblem book
emendation
The correction or alteration of text or manuscript where it is, or appears to be, corrupt.
enallage
A figurative device which involves the substitution of one grammatical form for another. It is commonly used in metaphor; e.g. "to palm someone off" or "to have a good laugh". Compare hypallage.
end rhyme
end-stopped line
A line in poetry that ends in a pause, indicated by a specific punctuation, such as a period or a semicolon.
English sonnet
enjambment
The continuing of a syntactic unit over the end of a line. Enjambment occurs when the sense of the line overflows the meter and line break.
entr'acte
envoi
epanalepsis
epic poetry
A long poem that narrates the victories and adventures of a hero. Such a poem is often identifiable by its lofty or elegant diction.
epic simile
epic theater
epigraph
1. An inscription on a statue, stone, or building.
2. The legend on a coin.
3. A quotation on the title page of a book.
4. A motto heading a new section or paragraph.
epilogue
epiphany
episode
episteme
epistle
epistolary novel
epistrophe
Repetition of a word or phrase at the end of clauses or sentences.
epitaph
epithalamion
epithet
epizeuxis
epode
eponymous author
erasure
The placing of a concept under suspicion by marking the word for it as crossed or struck through (e.g. "~~philosophy~~"), in order to signal to readers that it is both unreliable and at the same time indispensable. The device of placing words sous rature ("under erasure") has been adopted in modern philosophy and literary criticism, notably in deconstruction.
Erziehungsroman
essay
ethos
eulogy
euphony
euphuism
exaggeration
exegesis
exemplum
exordium
experimental novel
Explication de Texte
exposition
extended metaphor
extrametrical verse
eye rhyme
A kind of rhyme in which the spellings of paired words appear to match but without true correspondence in pronunciation; e.g. "dive/give", "said/maid", "bear/dear". Some were originally true rhymes but have become eye rhymes through changes in pronunciation; these are sometimes called historical rhymes.

== F ==
fable
fabliau
fairy tale
fake memoir
falling action
falling rhythm
fancy and imagination
fantasy
farce
feminine ending
feminine rhyme
A rhyme with two syllables, with one stressed and one unstressed; e.g. "merry" rhymed with "tarry". Contrast masculine rhyme.
fiction
figurative language
figure of speech
figure of twins
See hendiadys.
fin de siècle
flashback
An interjected scene that takes the narrative back in time from the current point the story has reached.
flashforward
An interjected scene that takes the narrative forward in time from the current point of the story in literature, film, television, and other media.
flat character
foil
folio
folk drama
folklore
foot
foreshadowing
form
fourteener
frame story
A story which contains either another tale (i.e. a story within a story) or a series of stories. Well-known examples include the One Thousand and One Arabian Nights and Geoffrey Chaucer's Canterbury Tales.
free indirect discourse
free verse
A type of poetry that does not conform to any regular meter: both the length of its lines and its use of rhyme (if at all) are irregular. In lieu of a regular metrical pattern, free verse uses more flexible cadences or rhythmic groupings, sometimes supported by anaphora and other devices of repetition. Free verse should not be confused with blank verse, which does observe a regular meter in its unrhymed lines.
French forms
fustian

== G ==
gallows humor
gathering
genetic fallacy
genre
Georgian poetry
gesta
Accounts of deeds or tales of adventure, often with morals attached to each tale, which were especially popular in the Middle Ages.
ghazal
gloss
An annotation that explains or translates a difficult word or phrase, usually added to a text by a later copyist or editor (as in many modern editions of Chaucer). When placed between the lines of a text, it is known as an interlinear gloss, but it may also appear in the margin, as a footnote, or in an appendix, and may form an extended commentary.
Gothic double
gnomic verse
golden line
Goliardic verse
Gongorism
Gonzo journalism
Gothic novel
Grand Guignol
Greek chorus
Greek tragedy
Grub Street
Gushi

== H ==
hagiography
haibun
A form of prose written in a terse, haikai style and accompanied by haiku.
haikai
A broad genre comprising the related forms of haiku haikai-renga and haibun.
haiku
A modern term for standalone hokku.
half rhyme
hamartia
The error or false step that leads a hero or protagonist in a tragedy to his or her downfall, as discussed by Aristotle in his Poetics. The protagonist's misfortune may be caused by some moral shortcoming or defect of character, or by his or her own misjudgment, ignorance, or hubris.
headless line
head rhyme
hemistich
hendecasyllable
hendecasyllabic verse
hendiadys

A figure of speech, used for emphasis, in which a single idea is expressed by means of two substantives joined by the conjunction "and" (e.g. by two nouns, as with "house and home" or "law and order"), rather than by a noun qualified by an adjective; the substitution of a conjunction for a subordination. Examples may also combine two adjectives ("nice and juicy") or two verbs ("come and get it"). A combination of three substantives is a hendiatris.
hendiatris
A figure of speech, used for emphasis, in which a single idea is expressed by means of three substantives joined by the conjunction "and" (e.g. "wine, women and song" or "sex, drugs and rock and roll"). A combination of two substantives is a hendiadys.
heptameter
heptastich
heresy of paraphrase
heroic couplets
heroic drama
heroic quatrain
heroic stanza
hexameter
A line from a poem that has six feet in its meter. Another name for hexameter is "The Alexandrine".
hexastich
hiatus
high comedy
higher criticism
historical fiction
historical linguistics
historic present
history play
hokku
In Japanese poetry, the opening stanza of a renga or renku (haikai no renga).
holograph
Homeric epithet
homily
Horatian ode
Horatian satire
hovering accent
hubris
hudibrastic
humor
humours
hymn
hymnal stanza
hypallage
hyperbaton
A figure of speech that alters the syntactic order of the words in a sentence or separates words that are ordinarily associated with each other. The term may also be used more generally for all different figures of speech that transpose the natural word order in sentences.
hyperbole
A figure of speech which contains a blatant exaggeration for emphasis, e.g. "I haven't seen you for ages" or "as old as the hills".
hypercatalectic
hypermetrical
hypocorism
hypotactic
A term referring to the use of different subordinate clauses in a sentence to qualify a single verb or modify it.
hysteron proteron

== I ==
iamb

A metrical unit (i.e. a foot) of poetic verse, having one unstressed syllable followed by one stressed syllable, as in the word "beyond" (or, in Greek or Latin quantitative verse, one short syllable followed by one long syllable). Lines of poetry made up predominantly of iambs are referred to as iambics or as iambic verse, which is by far the most commonly used metrical verse in English. Its most important form is the 10-syllable iambic pentameter, either rhymed (as in heroic couplets and sonnets) or unrhymed (in blank verse).
iambic pentameter
idiom
idyll
imagery
imagism
incipit
indeterminacy
inference
in medias res
innuendo
interjection
A word that is tacked onto a sentence in order to add strong emotion and which is grammatically unrelated to the rest of the sentence. Interjections are usually followed by an exclamation point.
internal conflict
internal rhyme
interpretation
intertextuality
Refers to the way in which different works of literature interact with and relate to one another to construct meaning.
intuitive description
irony

== J ==
Jacobean era
jeremiad
ji-amari
The use of one or more extra syllabic units (on) above the 5/7 standard in Japanese poetic forms such as waka and haiku.
jintishi
jitarazu
The use of fewer syllabic units (on) than the 5/7 standard in Japanese poetic forms such as waka and haiku.
jueju
juncture
Juvenalian satire

== K ==
kabuki
Kafkaesque
kenning
kigo
In Japanese poetry, a seasonal word or phrase required in haiku and renku.
King's English
kireji
In Japanese poetry, a "cutting word" required in haiku and hokku.
Künstlerroman

== L ==
lacuna
lai
Lake Poets
lament
laureate
lay
legend
legitimate theater
Leonine rhyme
level stress (even accent)
light ending
light poetry
light rhyme
light stress
limerick
linked rhyme
link sonnet
literary ballad
literary criticism
literary movement
literary epic
literary fauvism
literary realism
literary theory
literature
litotes
liturgical drama
logaoedic
logical fallacy
logical stress
logos
long metre
long poem
loose sentence
Lost Generation
low comedy
lullaby
lune
lushi
lyric
A short poem with a song-like quality, or designed to be set to music, often conveying feelings, emotions, or personal thoughts.

== M ==
macaronic language
madrigal
magic realism
malapropism
maqama
Märchen
See fairy tale.
marginalia
Marinism
marivauge
masculine ending
masculine rhyme
masked comedy
masque
maxim
meaning
medieval drama
meiosis
Melic poetry
melodrama
A work that is characterized by extravagant theatricality and by the predominance of plot and physical action over characterization.
memoir
Menippean satire
mesostic
metaphor
Making a comparison between two unlike things without using the words like, as, or than.
metaphysical conceit
metaphorical language
meter
metonymy
metrical accent
metrical foot
metrical structure
Microcosm Theatre
Middle Comedy
miles gloriosus
Miltonic sonnet
mimesis
Minnesang
mise en scène
misery literature
mock-heroic (mock epic)
mode
monodrama
monody
monogatari
monograph
monologue
monometer (monopody)
monostich
mood
mora
moral
morality play
motif
motivation
mummers' play
Muses
musical comedy
muwashshah
A multi-lined strophic verse form which flourished in Islamic Spain in the 11th century, written in Arabic or Hebrew.
mystery play
mythology

== N ==
narration
narrative poem
narrative point of view
narratology
narrator
naturalism
A theory or practice in literature emphasizing scientific observation of life without idealization and often including elements of determinism.
neo-Aristotelianis
A view of literature and criticism propagated by the Chicago School – Ronald S. Crane, Elder Olson, Richard McKeon, Wayne Booth, and others – that means "A view of literature and criticism that takes a pluralistic attitude toward the history of literature and seeks to view literary works and critical theories intrinsically."
neologism
The creation of new words, often arising from acronyms, word combinations, direct translations, or the addition of prefixes or suffixes to existing words.
non-fiction
novel
A genre of fiction that relies on narrative and possesses a considerable length, an expected complexity, and a sequential organization of action into story and plot distinctively. Novels are flexible in form (although prose is the standard), generally focus around one or more characters, and are continuously reshaped and reformed by a speaker.
novella
novelle

== O ==
objective correlative
objective criticism
obligatory scene
octameter
octave
octet
An eight-line stanza of poetry.
ode
A lyrical poem, sometimes sung, that focuses on the glorification of a single subject and its meaning. Often has an irregular stanza structure.
Oedipus complex
onomatopoeia
The formation of a word by imitation of a sound made by or associated with its referent, such as "cuckoo", "meow", "honk", or "boom".
open couplet
oulipo
ottava rima
A verse form in which each stanza has eight iambic pentameter lines following the rhyme scheme ABABABCC. An ottava rima was often used for long narratives, especially epics and mock-heroic poems.
Oxford Movement
oxymoron

== P ==
palinode
A poem or song in which the poet recants or counter-balances a statement made in an earlier poem.
pantoum
pantun
parable
paraclausithyron
paradelle
paradox
paraphrase
pararhyme
paratactic
The combining of various syntactic units, usually prepositions, without the use of conjunctions to form short and simple phrases.
partimen
pastourelle
pathetic fallacy
Pathya Vat
parallelism
parody
pastoral
A work depicting an idealized vision of the rural life of shepherds.
pathos
phrase
A sequence of two or more words forming a unit. In the poem “Kubla Khan” by Samuel Taylor Coleridge, the words “pleasure-dome” are a phrase read not only in this poem, but also in Mary Shelley’s Frankenstein when she uses also uses the phrase.
periodical literature
peripetia
persona
personification
phronesis
picaresque novel
plain style
Platonic idealism
plot
poetic diction
poetic transrealism
point of view
polysyndeton
post-colonialism
postmodernism
present perfect
A verb tense that describes actions just finished or continuing from the past into the present. This can also imply that past actions have present effects.
primal scene
procatalepsis
prolepsis

An interjected scene that takes the narrative forward in time from the current point of the story in literature, film, television, and other media.
prologue
progymnasmata
prose
prosimetrum
prosody
protagonist
protologism
proverb
pruning poem
Psalm
pun
purple prose
pyrrhic

== Q ==
quatrain
quintain

== R ==
recusatio
redaction
red herring
refrain
regency novel
regionalism
renga
A genre of Japanese collaborative poetry.
renku
In Japanese poetry, a form of popular collaborative linked verse formerly known as haikai no renga, or haikai.
renshi
A form of collaborative poetry pioneered by Makoto Ooka in Japan in the 1980s.
repetition
reverse chronology
rhapsodes
rhetoric
rhetorical device
rhetorical operations
rhetorical question
rhyme
rhymed prose
rhyme royal
rhythm
A measured pattern of words and phrases arranged by sound, time, or events. These patterns are [created] in verse or prose by use of stressed and unstressed syllables.
rising action
robinsonade
roman à clef
romance
Romantic hero
romanzo d'appendice
round-robin story
Ruritanian romance
Russian formalism

== S ==
Saj'
satire
scansion
scene
A subdivision of an act in a play, an opera, or any other form of theatrical entertainment, distinguished from preceding and following scenes by a curtain, the dimming of stage lights, and/or a brief emptying of the stage; or more generally, a particular part of a story depicting actions happening in one place at one time and between specific characters, often defined by its continuity.
scènes à faire
sea shanty
sensibility
sestet
setting
Shadorma
Shakespearean sonnet
Sicilian octave
simile
A comparison of two different things that utilizes “like” or “as”.
slant rhyme
skaz
sobriquet
soliloquy
sonnet
A 14-line poem written in iambic pentameter. There are two types of sonnets: Shakespearean and Italian. The Shakespearean sonnet is written with three quatrain and a couplet in ABAB, CDCD, EFEF, GG rhythmic pattern. An Italian sonnet is written in two stanzas with an octave followed by a septet in ABBA, ABBA, CDECDE or CDCDCD rhythmic pattern.
sonneteer
speaker
spondee
A foot consisting of two syllables of approximately equal stress.
Spenserian stanza
sprung rhythm
stanza
A group of lines in a poem offset by a space and then continuing with the next group of lines, with each group consisting of a set pattern or number of lines.
static character
stereotype
stichic
Having lines of the same meter and length throughout, but not organized into regular stanzas. An example is the form of Samuel Taylor Coleridge's poem "Frost at Midnight".
strambotto
stream of consciousness writing
structuralism
sublime
Of a profound and immeasurable experience, unable to be rationalized.
subplot
syllogism
symbolism
synecdoche
A figure of speech involving the expression of an entire idea by something smaller, such as a phrase or a single word, such that a term for one part of something is used to refer to the whole, or vice versa.
synesthesia

A rhetorical device that describes or associates one sense (i.e., touch, taste, see, hear, smell) in terms of another, typically in the form of a simile.
syntax
The study of how words are arranged in a sentence.

== T ==
tautology
A tautology is when something is defined or explained by saying exactly the same thing again in different words.
tableau
tail rhyme
Tagelied
tale
tanka
In Japanese poetry, a short poem in the form 5,7,5,7,7 syllabic units.
tan-renga
In Japanese poetry, a tanka where the upper part is composed by one poet and the lower part by another.
techne
telestich
A poem or other form of writing in which the last letter, syllable or word of each line, paragraph or other recurring feature in the text spells out a word or a message.
tenor
tercet
terza rima
tetrameter
tetrastich
text
textual criticism
textuality
Theatre of Cruelty
Theatre of the Absurd
theme
thesis
thesis play
third-person narrative
threnody
tirade
tone
tornada
In Occitan lyric poetry, a final, shorter stanza (cobla) addressed to a patron, lady, or friend.
tract
tragedy
tragedy of blood
tragic flaw
See hamartia.
tragic hero
tragic irony
tragic comedy
transcendentalism
transferred epithet
transition
translation
tribrach
trilogue
A trilogue is a literary form in which an imagined conversation between three participants is recorded
trimeter
triolet
triple rhyme
triple meter
triple rhythm
triplet
tristich
tritagonist
trivium
trobar clus
trochee
A two-syllable metrical foot with the accent syllable on the first foot.
trope
troubadour
trouvère
tuckerization
truncated line
tumbling verse
type character
type scene

== U ==
ubi sunt
underground art
underground press
understatement
unities
See classical unities.
universality
University Wits
uta monogatari
unreliable narrator

== V ==
variable syllable
variorum
Varronian satire

vates
vaudeville
verb displacement
verisimilitude
The quality of resembling reality.
verism
vers de société
vers libre
verse
verse paragraph
versiprose
verso
Victorian literature
vignette
A short scene that captures a single moment or a defining detail about a character, idea, or other element of a story.
villain
villanelle
virelay
virgule
voice
volta

A turn or switch that emphasizes a change in ideas or emotions, often marked by the words “but” or “yet”. In a sonnet, this change separates the octave from the sestet.
Vorticism
vulgate
The use of informal, common speech, particularly of uneducated people. Similar to the use of vernacular.

== W ==
waka
Wardour Street English
A pseudo-archaic form of diction affected by some writers, particularly those of historical fiction.
weak ending
weak foot
well-made play
Wellerism
Weltschmerz
A depressive mood of disappointment with—and alienation from—the world, prevalent in Romantic and decadent literature.
Western fiction
wit
word accent
wrenched accent

== Z ==
za
The site of a renga session; also, the sense of dialogue and community present in such a session.
zappai

== See also ==
- Glossary of poetry terms
- Index of literature articles
- Literary criticism
- Literary theory
