= Index of literature articles =

Articles related to literature include:

== A ==
Accent - Accentual verse - Accentual-syllabic verse - Aesthetic movement - Allegory - Alliteration - Allusion - Ambiguity - Anecdote - Antagonist - Apostrophe - Assonance - Author's purpose - Autobiography

== B ==
Ballad - Biography - Blank verse - Breve - Broadside - Burlesque

== C ==
Character - Characterization - Chronological order - Climax - Comedy - Conceit - Concrete poem - Conflict - Connotation - Context - Contrast - Consonance -Cordel literature - Couplet

== D ==
Dead metaphor - Detail - Denouement - Description - Dialect - Dialogue - Diary - Didactic literature - Diphthong - Doggerel - Drama - Dramatic monologue - Dramatic poetry

== E ==
Elegy - Elision Electronic literature- Emblematic poem - English studies - Epic - Epigram - Epitaph - Epithalamium - Essay - Eulogy - Exaggeration - Excerpt - Existentialism - Explorative strategies - Exposition - Expressionism - Extended metaphor - Eye rhyme

== F ==
Fable - Fantasy - Farce - Feminine ending - Fiction - Flash prose - Figurative language - Flashback - Folk tale - Foot - Foreshadowing - Frame story - Free verse

== G ==
Genre

== H ==
Haiku - Half rhyme - Hero/heroine - Hubris - Humour - Hyperbole

== I ==
Ictus - Idiom - Idyll - Imagist - Implicit metaphor - Internal rhyme - Inciting moment - Invocation - Irony

== L ==
Legend - Light verse - Limerick - Literary criticism - Literature - Litotes - Lyric

== M ==
Macaronic verse - Main character - Masculine ending - Masculine rhyme - Memoir - Merism - Metamorphosis - Metaphor - Metaphysical poet - Meter - Metonymy - Minor character - Mock heroic - Moral - myth

== N ==
Narrative poem - Narrator - Naturalism - Non-fiction - Novel

== O ==
Octet - Ode - Onomatopoeia - Oral tradition - Oxymoron

== P ==
Parable - Parody - Pastoral - Pathetic fallacy - Personification - Persuasion - Playwright - Plot - Poetic diction - Poetry - Point of view - Prose - Protagonist

== Q ==
Quantitative verse - Quatrain - Quintain (poetry) - Quotation

== R ==
Realism - Refrain - Repetition - Resistance literature - Resolution - Rhyme - Rhyme scheme - Rhythm

== S ==
Sarcasm - Scan (poetry) - Science fiction - Sensory language - Sextet - Short story - Simile - Slash - Socratic irony - Soliloquy - Sonnet - Sprung rhythm - Stage direction - Stanza - Style - Subliterature - Surprise ending - Surrealism - Suspense - Syllabic verse - Symbol - Symbolism - Synecdoche - Synaesthesia

== T ==
Tall tale - Theater - Theme - Transferred epithet

== U ==
Ubi sunt - Ultraist movement - Unanimism - Understatement - University Wits - Ut pictura poesis

== V ==
Variorum - Vers de société - Vers libre - Verse - Verse novel - Verse paragraph - Vice (character) - Victorian literature - Vignette (literature) - Villain/villainess - Villanelle - Virelai - Volta (literature)

== W ==
War poet - Whodunit

== Y ==
Yellow back

== Z ==
Zeugma

== See also ==
- Glossary of poetry terms
- List of literary terms
