= Juxtaposition =

Act of placing two elements side by side

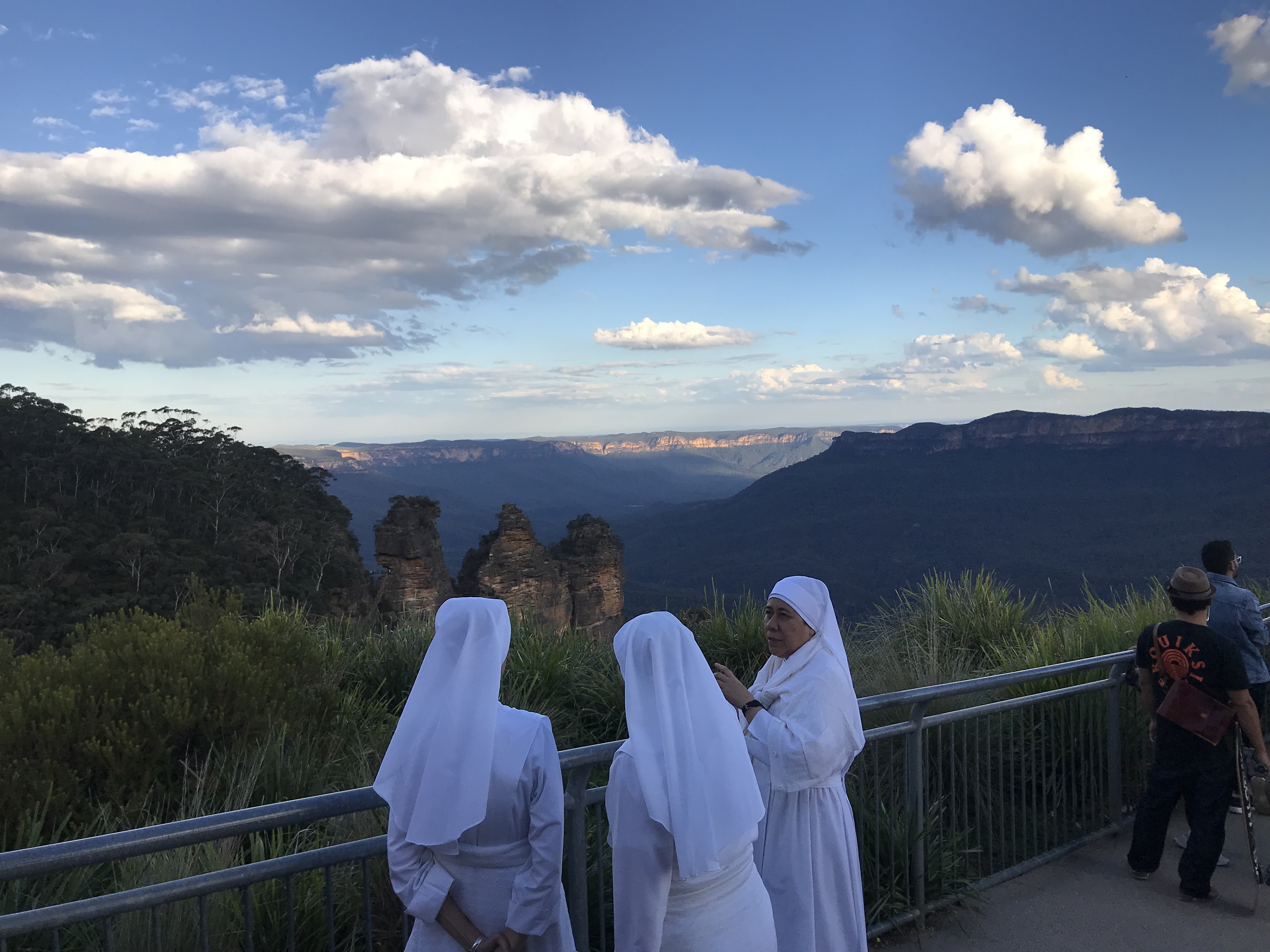
Juxtaposition of three sisters and the Three Sisters rock formation in Australia

Juxtaposition is an act or instance of placing two elements close together or side by side. This is often done in order to compare or contrast two elements or emphasize similarities or differences.

== Speech ==
Juxtaposition in literary terms is the comparison of words or concepts by placing them side by side or close together. An example of juxtaposition are the quotes "Ask not what your country can do for you; ask what you can do for your country", and "Let us never negotiate out of fear, but let us never fear to negotiate", both by John F. Kennedy, who particularly liked juxtaposition as a rhetorical device. Jean Piaget specifically contrasts juxtaposition in various fields from syncretism, arguing that "juxtaposition and syncretism are in antithesis, syncretism being the predominance of the whole over the details, juxtaposition that of the details over the whole". Piaget writes:

In visual perception, juxtaposition is the absence of relations between details; syncretism is a vision of the whole which creates a vague but all-inclusive schema, supplanting the details. In verbal intelligence juxtaposition is the absence of relations between the various terms of a sentence; syncretism is the all-round understanding which makes the sentence into a whole. In logic juxtaposition leads to an absence of implication and reciprocal justification between the successive judgments; syncretism creates a tendency to bind everything together and to justify by means of the most ingenious or the most facetious devices.

In grammar, juxtaposition refers to the absence of linking elements in a group of words that are listed together. Thus, where English uses the conjunction and (e.g. mother and father), many languages use simple juxtaposition ("mother father"). In logic, juxtaposition is a logical fallacy on the part of the observer, where two items placed next to each other imply a correlation, when none is actually claimed. For example, an illustration of a politician and Adolf Hitler on the same page would imply that the politician had a common ideology with Hitler. Similarly, saying "Hitler was in favor of gun control, and so are you" would have the same effect. This particular rhetorical device is common enough to have its own name, Reductio ad Hitlerum.

== Mathematics ==
In algebra, multiplication involving variables is often written as a juxtaposition (e.g., $xy$ for $x$ times $y$ or $5x$ for five times $x$), also called implied multiplication. The notation can also be used for quantities that are surrounded by parentheses (e.g., $5(2)$ or $(5)(2)$ for five times two). This implicit usage of multiplication can cause ambiguity when the concatenated variables happen to match the name of another variable, when a variable name in front of a parenthesis can be confused with a function name, or in the correct determination of the order of operations.

In mathematics, juxtaposition of symbols is the adjacency of factors with the absence of an explicit operator in an expression, commonly used for multiplication: $ax$ denotes the product of $a$ with $x$, or $a$ times $x$. It is also used for scalar multiplication, matrix multiplication, function composition, and logical and. In numeral systems, juxtaposition of digits has a specific meaning. In geometry, juxtaposition of names of points represents lines or line segments. In lambda calculus, juxtaposition $fx$ denotes function application (not to be confused with the function notation $f(x)$ which does not mean $f$ multiplied by $x$) . In physics, juxtaposition is also used for "multiplication" of a numerical value and a physical quantity, and of two physical quantities, for example, three times $\pi$ would be written as $3\pi$ and "area equals length times width" as $A=\ell w$.

== Arts ==
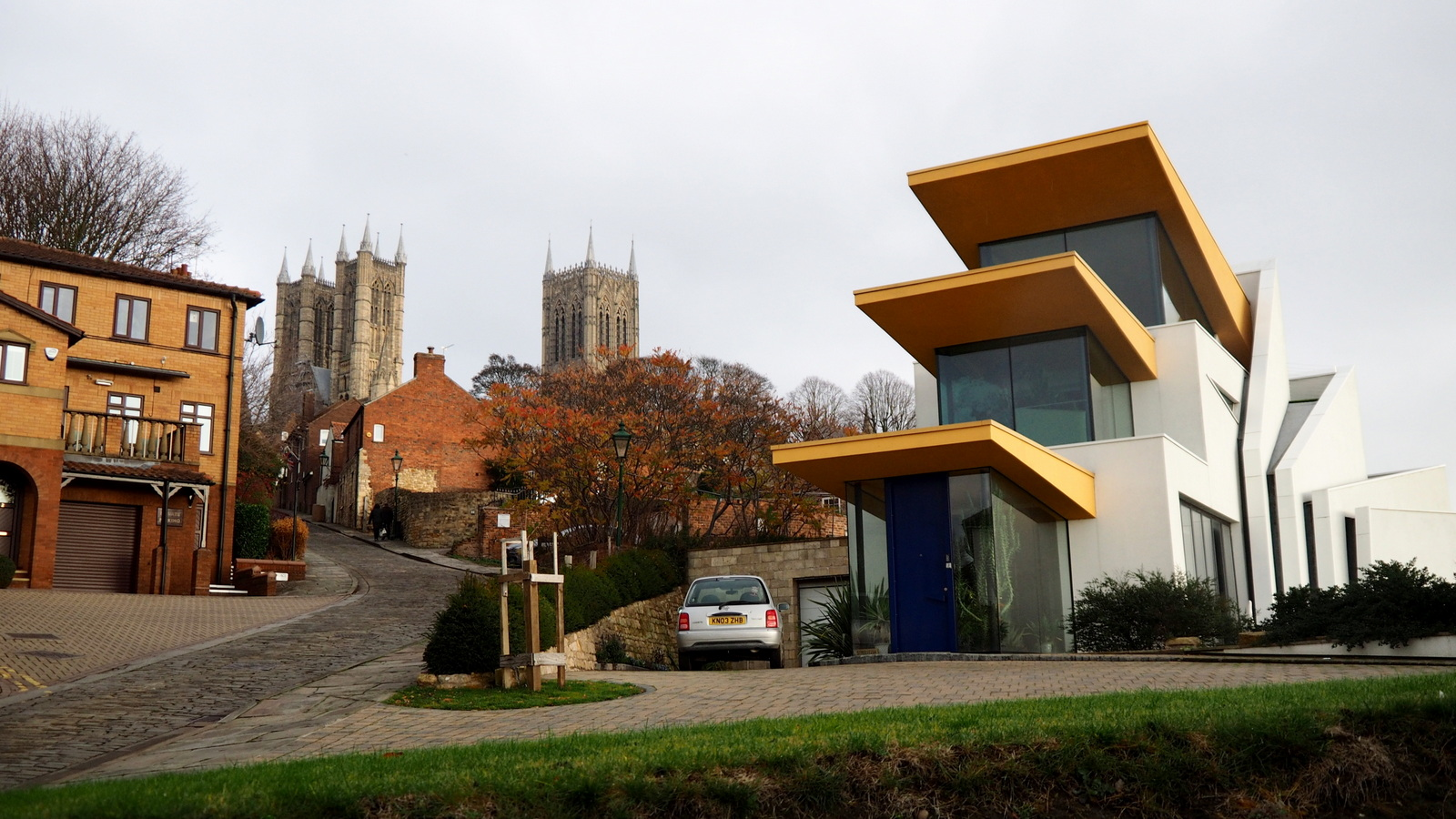
A modern-style house contrasts with the older structures in the background in Lincoln, Lincolnshire, England in 2018

Throughout the arts, juxtaposition of elements is used to elicit a response within the audience's mind, such as creating meaning from the contrast. In music, it is an abrupt change of elements, and is a procedure of musical contrast. In film, the position of shots next to one another (montage) is intended to have this effect. In painting and photography, the juxtaposition of colours, shapes, etc, is used to create contrast, while the position of particular kinds of objects one upon the other or different kinds of characters in proximity to one another is intended to evoke meaning. Various forms of juxtaposition occur in literature, where two images that are otherwise not commonly brought together appear side by side or structurally close together, thereby forcing the reader to stop and reconsider the meaning of the text through the contrasting images, ideas, motifs, etc. For example, "He was slouched gracefully" is a juxtaposition. More broadly, an author can juxtapose contrasting types of characters, such as a hero and a rogue working together to achieve a common objective from very different motivations.

== See also ==
- Juxtaposed controls
- Literary foil
