= Periodic sentence =

Sentence style

A periodic sentence is a sentence with a stylistic device featuring syntactical subordination to a single main idea, which usually is not complete until the very end of the sentence. The periodic sentence emphasizes its main idea by placing it at the end, following all the subordinate clauses and other modifiers that support the principal idea. According to Merriam-Webster, the linguistic sense of the periodic sentence term was coined circa 1928, but there is evidence of its usage in a separate sense dating from 1766.

== Characteristics ==
A periodic sentence unfolds gradually, so that the thought contained in the subject/verb group only emerges at the sentence's conclusion. It is used mostly in what in oratory is called the grand style. It is the opposite of the loose sentence, also continuous or running style, where the subject and verb are introduced at the beginning of the sentence. Periodic sentences often rely on hypotaxis, whereas running sentences are typified by parataxis.

Cicero is generally considered to be the master of the periodic sentence.

Periodic sentences can be used to draw suspense and build curiosity via enticing the reader until a climatic point— the reveal of the sentence's main subject or verb.

== Decline ==
In English literature, the decline of the periodic sentence's popularity as identifiably grand style goes hand in hand with the development toward a less formal style, which some authors date to the beginning of the Romantic period, specifically the 1798 publication of the Lyrical Ballads, and the prevalence in twentieth-century literature of spoken language over written language. In American literature, scholars note the explicit rejection by Henry David Thoreau of the formal style of his time, of which the grand style of periodic sentence was characteristic. In his journal, Thoreau criticized those sentences as the "weak and flowing periods of the politician and scholar."

== Rhetorical and literary usage ==
Periodic sentences are rooted in the rhetorical techniques of Isocrates, who focused on a natural style that imitated how people speak. According to William Harmon, the periodic sentence is used "to arouse interest and curiosity, to hold an idea in suspense before its final revelation." In the words of William Minto, "the effect...is to keep the mind in a state of uniform or increasing tension until the dénouement."

In his Handbook to Literature, Harmon offers an early example in American literature found in Longfellow’s "Snowflakes":

Out of the bosom of the Air,
Out of the cloud-folds of her garment shaken,
Over the woodlands brown and bare,
Over the harvest-fields forsaken,
Silent and soft, and slow,
Descends the snow.

Starting with a succession of parallel adverbial phrases ("Out of the bosom," "Out of the cloud-folds," "Over the woodlands," "Over the harvest-fields"), each followed by parallel modification ("of the air," "of her garment shaken," "brown and bare," "forsaken"), the sentence is left grammatically incomplete until the subject/verb group "Descends the snow". Other American examples cited include the opening lines of William Cullen Bryant's "A Forest Hymn" and lines 9-16 of his "Thanatopsis". A particularly long example is the opening stanza (lines 1-22) of Walt Whitman's "Out of the Cradle Endlessly Rocking"; another is the opening sentence of Milton's Paradise Lost.

A well-known example of a periodic sentence occurs in Nikolai Gogol's short story "The Overcoat":

Even at those hours when the gray Petersburg sky is completely overcast and the whole population of clerks have dined and eaten their fill, each as best he can, according to the salary he receives and his personal tastes; when they are all resting after the scratching of pens and bustle of the office, their own necessary work and other people's, and all the tasks that an overzealous man voluntarily sets himself even beyond what is necessary; when the clerks are hastening to devote what is left of their time to pleasure; some more enterprising are flying to the theater, others to the street to spend their leisure staring at women's hats, some to spend the evening paying compliments to some attractive girl, the star of a little official circle, while some—and this is the most frequent of all—go simply to a fellow clerk's apartment on the third or fourth story, two little rooms with a hall or a kitchen, with some pretensions to style, with a lamp or some such article that has cost many sacrifices of dinners and excursions—at the time when all the clerks are scattered about the apartments of their friends, playing a stormy game of whist, sipping tea out of glasses, eating cheap biscuits, sucking in smoke from long pipes, telling, as the cards are dealt, some scandal that has floated down from higher circles, a pleasure which the Russian do never by any possibility deny himself, or, when there is nothing better to talk about, repeating the everlasting anecdote of the commanding officer who was told that the tail had been cut off the horse on the Falconet monument—in short, even when everyone, was eagerly seeking entertainment, Akaky Akakievich did not indulge in any amusement.

== See also ==
- Euphuism
