= Ernest Hebert =

American writer (born 1941)

- Born: 4 May 1941; Keene, New Hampshire
- Occupations: Novelist; poet; professor; artist
- Spouse: Medora Levoie
- Children: 2
- Writing career
- Period: 1979–present
- Genre: Fiction
- Notable works: The Dogs of March (1979), A Little More Than Kin (1982), Whisper My Name (1984), The Passion of Estelle Jordan (1987), Live Free or Die (1990), Spoonwood (2005), Howard Elman's Farewell (2014), The Contrarian Voice: And Other Poems (2017)

Ernest Hebert (born May 4, 1941) is an American author. He is best known for the Darby Chronicles Series, which is a series of seven novels written between 1979 and 2014 about modern life in a fictional New Hampshire town as it transitions from relative rural poverty to being more upscale, almost suburban. He has also written several stand-alone novels, including Mad Boys, The Old American, and The Contrarian Voice: And Other Poems.

== Biography ==
Hebert was born in Keene, New Hampshire, and was named after his mother's eldest brother, Reverend Joseph Ernest Vaccarest. Ernest attended public school and graduated from Keene High School in 1959. He applied to Keene State College upon graduation, but was initially denied admission based on his ACT scores. As a result, he served in the army reserves for six months before beginning work at the New England Telephone and Telegraph Company as a central office equipment installer. After the assassination of President John F. Kennedy in 1963, he decided to quit his job and reapply to Keene State College.

Upon admission to college, Hebert hired a retired Keene school teacher to tutor him in English studies. The reading assignment she chose for him was The History of Henry Esmond, Esq. by William Makepeace Thackeray, which he intensely disliked. He began his college career in the fall of 1964 and initially majored in history. After several semesters, however, he realized that he much preferred writing to history. In his junior year, Hebert read the poem Preludes by T.S. Eliot which entirely transformed his outlook on life. He then gave up writing prose to focus entirely on writing poetry and changed his major from History to English.

Hebert met his future wife, Medora Lavoie, at Keene State College. They married in early 1969, the same year he graduated from Keene State. Upon graduation, Hebert and his wife moved to California so that Hebert could attend Stanford University in pursuit of a master's degree. While attending Stanford, Hebert studied creative writing with a concentration in poetry. After several semesters, however, Hebert concluded that he had learned everything he could from his professors and that graduate school was not for him.{cn} He and his wife then returned to New Hampshire so that Medora could finish her bachelor's degree at Keene State College.

Hebert began working as a journalist for several newspaper during this time period, including The Keene Sentinel Newspaper, Business NH Magazine, The New Hampshire Times, and The Boston Globe. In 1972, he won two Journalism Excellence Awards from United Press International. During this time period, Hebert wrote The Dogs of March, which was published by Viking Press in 1979. This novel was the first book in his Darby Chronicles Series of novels, which centers around the fictional town of Darby, New Hampshire. Over the last several decades, Hebert has continued to write this series, which includes: A Little More Than Kin, Whisper My Name, The Passion of Estelle Jordan, Live Free or Die, Spoonwood, and Howard Elman's Farewell. He has also written several stand-alone works, the most recent of which was a collection of poetry titled The Contrarian Voice: And Other Poems.

In addition to his writing, Hebert worked as a professor of English and creative writing at Dartmouth College for more than 25 years before retiring. Over the course of his career as a professor, he taught several notable people, including David Benioff. Hebert is the first member of faculty at Dartmouth College to be tenured as a fiction writer.

Dartmouth College houses his earlier work relating primarily to his Darby Series of novels. Keene State College, his alma mater, additionally has a collection which includes Hebert's digital artwork, original galleys of his novels, and early drafts of his books.

== Works ==
- The Contrarian Voice: And Other Poems (Bauhan Publishing, LLC) 2017
- Never Back Down (David Godine, Inc.) 2012
- I Love U (Recycling Reality, ebook) 2011
- New Hampshire Patterns, with Jon Gilbert Fox, photographer (University Press of New England) 2007
- The Old American (UPNE) 2000 (Outstanding Fiction award, New Hampshire Writers Project)
- Mad Boys (UPNE) 1993 (Outstanding Fiction award, New Hampshire Writers Project)
- The Kinship (UPNE) 1993 (reprint of two novels from Darby series plus an essay)
- The Darby series:
  - Howard Elman's Farewell (UPNE 2014)
  - Spoonwood (UPNE) 2005 (Won an IPPY, best regional novel in the Northeast for 2005)
  - Live Free or Die (Viking Press 1990) (reprinted by UPNE 1993)
  - The Passion of Estelle Jordan (Viking 1987)
  - Whisper My Name (Viking 1984)
  - A Little More Than Kin (Viking 1982)
  - The Dogs of March (Viking 1979) (Citation for excellence in a first novel, by Hemingway Foundation)
