= Cumulative sentence =

Cumulative sentence may refer to:

Grammar

- Loose sentence, a type of sentence structure

Law

- Consecutive terms of imprisonment. See Sentence (law)
