= Romanzo d'appendice =

Romanzo d'appendìce (Italian for feuilleton) was a genre in literature. It originated in England and France, in the second half of the 19th and the beginning of the 20th.

This literary genre is characterised by the existence of many and often recurring characters, and by many cliffhangers at the end of a chapter, to ensure sales of the next episode. This is a clear case of form influencing content: these novels were published in episodes in Italian newspapers. They could in a certain sense be compared to modern soap opera. Ponson du Terrail, Eugene Sue, Maurice Leblanc, Gustave Le Rouge and Michel Zévaco were among the numerous authors which contributed to the genre.

Feuilleton is used in current language to indicate a quite improbable story.
