= Light rhyme =

Light rhyme designates a weakened, or unaccented, rhyme that pairs a stressed final syllable with an unstressed one. A rhyme of this kind is also referred to as a wrenched rhyme since the pronunciation of the unstressed syllable is forced into conformity with the stressed syllable of its rhyme mate (eternity/free). Light rhymes are commonly found in music where words are sung with an unnatural emphasis on the final syllable.

== Examples ==
In the 1917 poem “Preludes” T.S. Eliot used the light rhyme to evoke the uneasiness felt by an individual isolated from society in a modern urban setting.

The winter evening settles down
With smell of steaks in passageways.
Six o'clock.
The burnt-out ends of smoky days.
And now a gusty shower wraps
The grimy scraps
Of withered leaves about your feet
[…]

== See also ==
- Rhyme
