= A Forest Hymn =

Poem by William Cullen Bryant

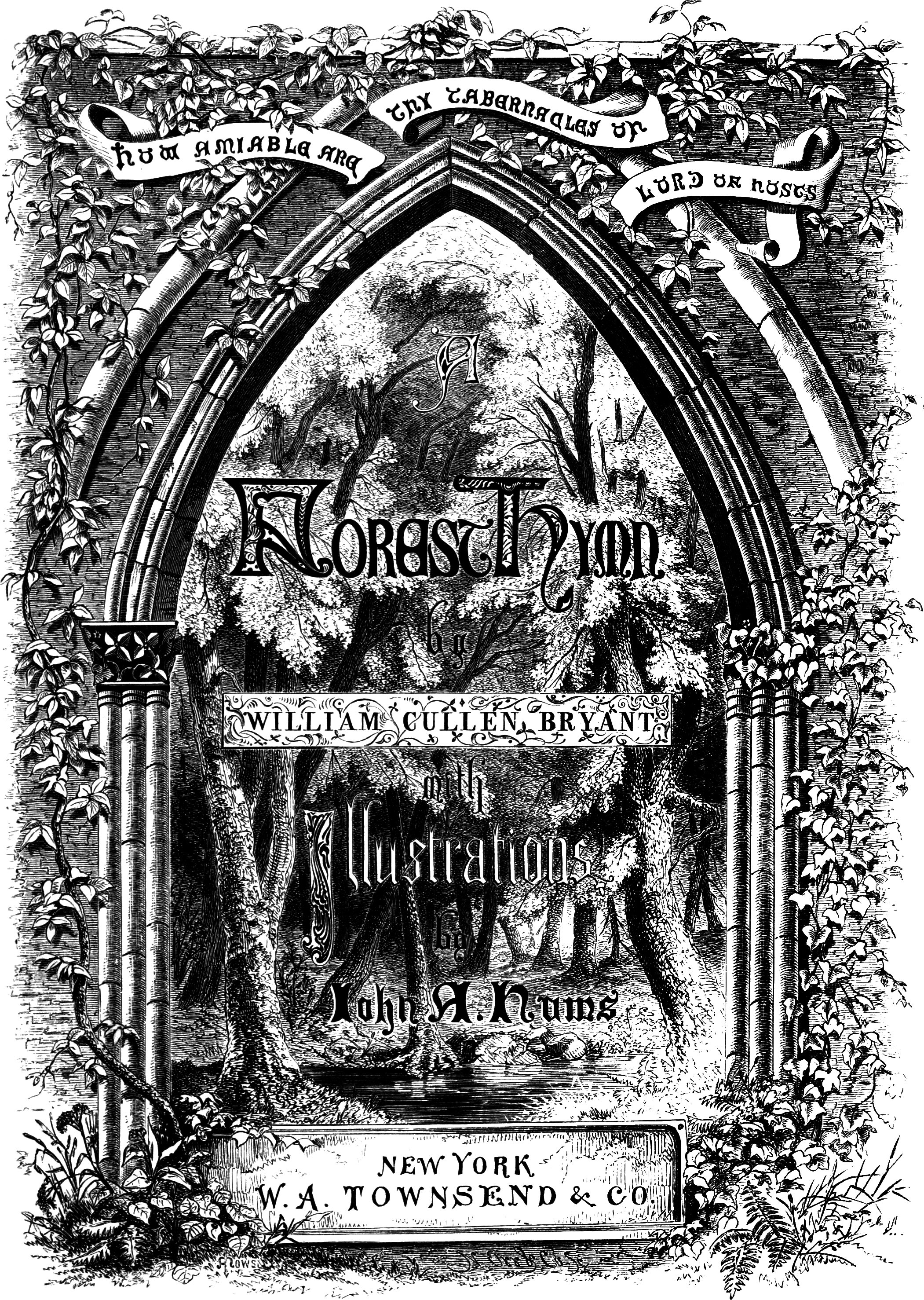
Frontispiece of an 1860 publication

"A Forest Hymn" is an 1824 poem written by William Cullen Bryant, which has been called one of Bryant's best poems, and "one of the best nature poems of that age". It was first published in Boston in the United States Literary Gazette along with several other poems written by Bryant.

== Analysis and reception ==
Said to have been only conceivable by someone familiar with the "thick foliage and tall trunks of [the] primeval forests" in Massachusetts, "A Forest Hymn" is said to have been Bryant's way of saying farewell to country life before moving to New York City in 1825, which came about during a period where he wrote a large number of works. It is reflective of Bryant's love of nature and religious belief, has been called a "picturesque poem", and Richard Henry Stoddard has said:

The gravity, the dignity, the solemnity of natural devotion, were never before stated so accurately and with such significance. We stand in thought in the heart of a great forest, under its broad roof of boughs, awed by the sacred influences of the place. A gloom which is not painful settles upon us; we are surrounded by mystery and unseen energy. The shadows are full of worshippers and beautiful things that live in their misty twilights.

At the pace of the wind "playing upon the leaves and the branches of the ancient woods, Eleanor O'Grady has suggested that the poem be read in a smooth and gliding manner, as done in Median Stress.

The poem has been published many times, including an 1860 edition with illustrations by John A. Hows.

John Muir's first article advocating forest protection, a February 5, 1876, editorial in the Sacramento Daily Record-Union, alludes to Bryant's first line in its title: "God's First Temples: How Shall We Preserve Our Forests".

== Sources ==
- Blount, Alma (1914). Intensive studies in American literature. Macmillan. OCLC 2082749.
- Bryant, William Cullen (1860). A Forest Hymn . W. A. Townsend & co.
- Jones, Lewis Henry (1904). Jones readers by grades. Vol. 8. Ginn & Company. OCLC 4105987.
- Lamberton, John Porter (1908). The Masterpieces and the history of literature: analysis, criticism, character and incident. Hamilton Book Co. OCLC 12648626.
- The Methodist Review. Vol. 11, 19, 41. The Methodist book concern. 1859. OCLC 1757206.
- O'Grady, Eleanor (1890). Aids to correct and effective elocution: with selected readings and recitations for practice. Benziger Brothers. OCLC 37011706.
- Royse, Noble Kibby (1871). A manual of American literature: designed for the use of schools of advanced grades. Cowperthwait and Company. OCLC 5691582.
- Silverman, Kenneth (1971). Literature in America: A century of expansion. Vol. 2. Free Press. OCLC 127649.
- Stoddard, Richard Henry (1900). "Bryant, William Cullen" . Appletons' Cyclopædia of American Biography .
- Symington, Andrew James (1880). William Cullen Bryant: a biographical sketch: with selections from his poems and other writings. Harper & Brothers. OCLC 10645450.
