= Pruning poem =

Type of poem

A pruning poem is a poem that uses rhymes that are prunings of each other.

Each rhyme word is one letter shorter than the rhyme word in the preceding line. Otherwise, they are the same word. Pruning could be accomplished by cutting terminal as well as initial letters, but initial position pruning is the more common and noticeable. While it is possible to write a pruning poem in couplets or longer, it is most effective when the reader sees the pruning on the page. Thus, George Herbert, who conducted many formal experiments in verse, writes Paradise as a pruning poem.

What open force, or hidden charm
Can blast my fruit, or bring me harm
While the inclosure is thine arms?

Literary critic Joseph Summers suggested that the use of the pruning form in this poem in particular "compel[s] the reader to 'see' what the poem is saying". Professor Janis Lull noted that it "reflects the influence of the traditional echo poem".

Another form of the pruning poem is the "diminishing" or "vanishing" poem, whereby each strophe has a decreasing number of words; an example of this form is "A Fit of Something Against Something" by Alan Ansen.
