= Acatalexis =

An acatalectic line of verse is one having the metrically complete number of syllables in the final foot. When talking about poetry written in English, the term is arguably of limited significance or utility—at least by comparison to its antonym, catalectic—for the simple reason that acatalexis is considered to be the "usual case" in the large majority of metrical contexts, and therefore explicit reference to it proves almost universally superfluous.

For example, to describe Shakespeare's sonnets as having been written in iambic pentameter acatalectic would be factually accurate, but redundant and never said, because iambic pentameter is presumed to be acatalectic unless specified as being catalectic. However, in very rare contexts where catalexis might be considered probable (e.g., in English trochaic tetrameter, or in differentiating acatalectic verses from surrounding catalectic ones), explicit expression of the verse's metrical completeness may be achieved by using the term. When talking about poems published in languages other than English, the term might prove itself more useful. For example, acatalectic iambic lines are unusual in Polish poetry because feminine ending is dominant. Thus, iambic pentameter in Polish is not 10 syllables long but almost always 11 syllables long.

== See also ==
- Catalexis
- Prosody (linguistics)
