= Beast poetry =

Collection of medieval poems

In European literature and medieval studies, beast poetry is a corpus of poems written in Latin from the 8th to the 11th century.

These poems draw upon an ancient literary tradition of anthropomorphic animals dating back into antiquity and exemplified by Aesop. They are the immediate foundation for the flowering of Reynard literature that occurred in the 12th century. Elements from beast poetry have been adapted into subsequent works ranging from the Canterbury Tales to contemporary movies made with computer animation.

Although it makes sense to discuss beast poetry as a single corpus of literature, it do not form a genre rather:

The medieval Latin poems have few immediately discernible traits in common with one another. They were not the products of the same time or region. They range greatly in length... In structure, a beast poem can be as humble as one speech by a bird struggling to fly home safely... but then again it can intertwine a dozen main stories and another dozen visions, reminiscences, and divagations... The beast poems were created for many occasions and audiences... to be pored over in the library... read aloud, sung, and staged... Some were perhaps scripts for schoolroom performances... others for recitation in the refectory.

== Some examples ==
- De lupo (The Wolf)
- Species comice (Comic Visions)
- De pugna avium (The Battle of the Birds)
- De vulpecula involante gallinam (The Fox and Hen)
- Quod cycni faciunt (What Do the Swans Do?)
- Flete, canes (Weep, Dogs)
- Pulicis et musce iurgia (Quarrel of the Flea and the Fly)
- De asino ad episcopum ducto (The Ass Brought before the Bishop)
- Gallus et vulpes (The Cock and the Fox)
- De pulice (The Flea)
- Italian: De Lombardo et lumac (The Lombard and Snail)
- Testamentum asini (The Donkey's Testament)
- Testamentum porcelli (The Piglet's Testament)
- Altercatio nani et leporis (Altercation of the Dwarf and Hare)
- Altercacio aranee et musce (Altercation of the Spider and the Fly)

== See also ==
- Bestiary
