= Rising action =

Rising action is a segment in the structure of a dramatic or literary work.

- Rising action, analysed as part of a three-act structure
- Rising action, analysed by Gustav Freytag as part of a five-act structure
