= Pathya Vat =

Form of Cambodian verse

The Pathya Vat is a Cambodian verse form, consisting of four lines of four syllables each, where lines two and three rhyme. When a poem consists more than one stanza, the last line of the previous stanza rhymes with the second and third lines of the following one.

The form is traditionally recited or sung in many different styles, including:

- kmeng vat (temple boy)
- piporanea (description)
- tumnuonh (grief)
- smaut (reciting)
- kamhoeung (anger)
- chbapp (traditional code)
- ka-ek lot (crow hops)
- ka-ek baul (crow calls)
