= Shadorma =

The Shadorma is a poetic form consisting of a six-line stanza (or sestet) that originated from Spain. Each stanza has a syllable count of three syllables in the first line, five syllables in the second line, three syllables in the third and fourth lines, seven syllables in the fifth line, and five syllables in the sixth line (3/5/3/3/7/5) for a total of 26 syllables. A poem may consist of one stanza, or an unlimited number of stanzas, called a series. It is typically unrhymed.
