= High comedy =

Comedy characterized by wit, sophistication, and subtle social commentary

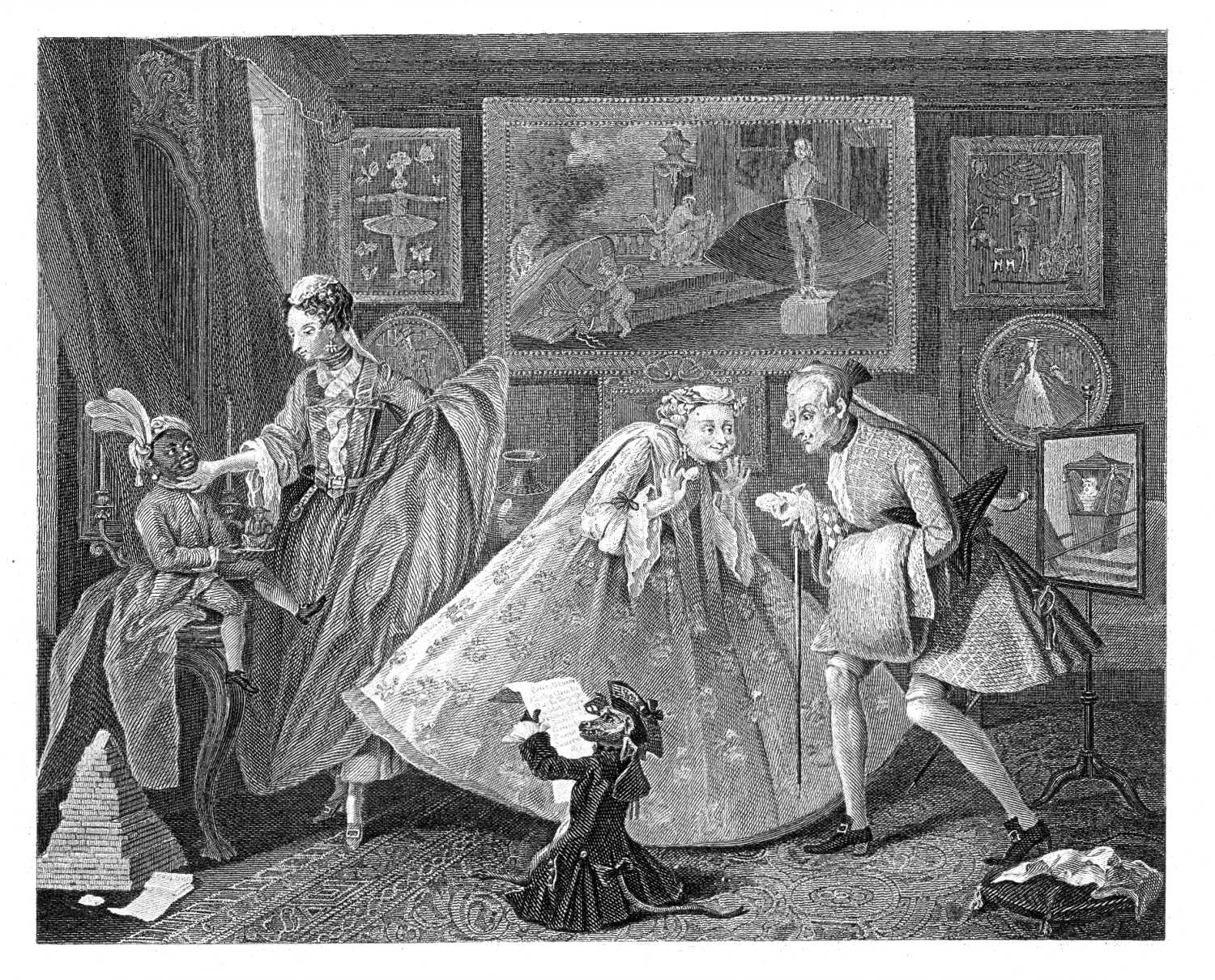
Taste in High Life, a satirical painting by William Hogarth.

High comedy is a term used to refer to a comedy that is marked by intelligence or sophistication. Such a comedy may include witty dialogue, satire, wordplay, psychologically realistic characterisation, intricate plotting, social commentary, or intellectual themes. A high comedy will typically feature characters from higher social classes. A naturalistic performance style can also be indicative of high comedy.

High comedy will be relatively subtle, and may reference things external to the text, requiring the audience to have a level of sophistication to discern the humorous elements. Those who enjoy high comedies are more likely to be more highly educated and more aware themselves of the distinction between high and low comedy. The less-educated may not recognise the subtleties in a work of high comedy.

The term is the opposite of low comedy, which may feature bawdiness, buffoonery or slapstick, performed in a broad style. There is no clear distinction between works of high and low comedy, and the terms can sometimes be used in a subjective manner. A single work may include elements characteristic of both high comedy and low comedy, and not strictly fit either category. A high comedy may incorporate low-comedy elements in an ironic or satirical manner, thereby demonstrating sophistication in the use of elements that are low-comedy. The presence of features of low comedy therefore does not necessarily preclude a work from being categorised as high comedy.

A work of high comedy may be regarded as highbrow, and an instance of high culture. However, those terms are primarily used to refer to works that are serious in nature. A comedy will aim to be amusing or entertaining even when it is sophisticated, so even a high comedy is less likely than a drama to be regarded as high culture.

== Examples ==
The quintessential example of high comedy is The Importance of Being Earnest by Oscar Wilde. The novels of Jane Austen are also a common example. Don Quixote may be considered a work of high comedy; the novelist George Meredith wrote: "Heart and mind laugh out at Don Quixote, and still you brood on him".

The works of Menander are considered to be the first example of high comedy, the plays of Aristophanes being cited by some as high comedy, and by others as only containing elements of high comedy. Some of the plays of Moliere and George Bernard Shaw are considered exemplary of high comedy.

Annie Hall is an example of a comedy film that was received by critics as a work of high culture.

== See also ==
- Low comedy
- High culture and highbrow
- Comedy of manners
- Absurdist fiction
- Tragicomedy
- Comedy of menace
- Greek new comedy
