= Classification (literature) =

Classification is a figure of speech linking a proper noun to a common noun using the or other articles.

== Example ==
- "Finland, the land of a thousand lakes."
- "Japan, the land of the rising sun."
