= Dissociation of sensibility =

Dissociation of sensibility is a literary term first used by T. S. Eliot in his essay "The Metaphysical Poets." It refers to a way that, in Eliot's judgment, intellectual thought was separated from the experience of feeling in poetry during the course of the seventeenth century.

== Origin of terminology ==
Eliot used the term "dissociation of sensibility" to describe how English poetry changed "between the time of Donne or Lord Herbert of Cherbury and the time of Tennyson and Browning." In "The Metaphysical Poets", Eliot attempts to define the metaphysical poet and in doing so to determine the metaphysical poet's era as well as his discernible qualities.

We may express the difference by the following theory: The poets of the seventeenth century, the successors of the dramatists of the sixteenth, possessed a mechanism of sensibility which could devour any kind of experience. They are simple, artificial, difficult, or fantastic, as their predecessors were; no less nor more than Dante, Guido Cavalcanti, Guinicelli, or Cino. In the seventeenth century a dissociation of sensibility set in, from which we have never recovered; and this dissociation, as is natural, was aggravated by the influence of the two most powerful poets of the century, Milton and Dryden.

== Theory of dissociation of sensibility ==
The theory of dissociation of sensibility rests upon Eliot's description of the disparity in style that exists between the metaphysical poets of the sixteenth and early seventeenth century and the poets of the late seventeenth century onward. In "The Metaphysical Poets," Eliot argues that the earlier grouping of poets was "constantly amalgamating disparate experience" and thus expressing their thoughts through the experience of feeling, while the later poets did not unite their thoughts with their emotive experiences and therefore expressed thought separately from feeling. He says that the dissociation of sensibility is the reason for the "difference between the intellectual and the reflective poet." The earlier intellectual poet, Eliot writes, "possessed a mechanism of sensibility which could devour any kind of experience". When the dissociation of sensibility occurred, "[the] poets revolted against the ratiocinative, the descriptive; they thought and felt by fits, unbalanced; they reflected." Thus dissociation of sensibility is the point at which and the manner by which this change in poetic method and style occurred; it is defined by Eliot as the loss of sensation united with thought.

Eliot uses John Donne's poetry as the most prominent example of united sensibility and thought. He writes, "[a] thought to Donne was an experience; it modified his sensibility." Eliot's apparent appreciation of Donne's ability to unify intellectual thought and the sensation of feeling demonstrates that he believes dissociation of sensibility to be a hindrance in the progression of poetry. Eliot asserts that despite the progress of refined language, the separation between thought and emotion led to the end of an era of poetry that was "more mature" and that would "wear better" than the poetry that followed.

Eliot, later on in his career, was challenged with the thought that the dissociation within literature had been caused by the English Civil War in the mid 17th century. He did not agree or disagree to this theory but rather stated "cryptically that he thought it might have been caused by the same factors as those which brought about the Civil War."

== Alternative literary interpretations ==
In his article "T. S. Eliot's Theory of Dissociation," Allen Austin describes dissociation of sensibility as a concept that "involves not only the integration of sensation and idea … but also a special kind of thought—a detached intellectuality combined with passion." Austin asserts that Eliot defines this term in order to provide a rationale for the combination of wit and emotion. He says that Eliot sees the dissociation of wit and emotion as not only the separation of intellect and sensibility, but also the separation of the conceptual image from the intellectual idea. Austin thinks that Eliot uses dissociation of sensibility to describe more than just the dissociation of thought from feeling; he asserts that Eliot also explains the separation of "language from sensibility", using Eliot's assertion that "while the language became more refined, the feeling became more crude" as evidence. He also cites "The Metaphysical Poets" and the concept of dissociation of sensibility in arguing that Eliot's appreciation of thought united with emotion is also a method of defending his own poetry, as his writing reflects the metaphysical poets' style of combining wit and feeling.

Henry Louis Gates Jr., in his essay "Writing 'Race' and the Difference It Makes", uses Eliot's dissociation of sensibility in reference to the presence of race in literature. Gates asserts race has lost its voice in contemporary literature, and that modern critics do not see race as a factor of more than intrinsic value in literary theory. He writes: "For millions who originated outside Europe, however, this dissociation of sensibility has its origins in colonialism and human slavery." Gates goes on to argue that, in this context, dissociation of sensibility reflects the way in which literature, in this sense analogous to thought, is dissociated from race and otherness (which parallel Eliot's idea of feeling).
