= Flash prose =

Flash prose, also known as flash literature, is brief creative writing, generally on the order of between 500 and 1500 words. It is also an umbrella term that encompasses various short format works such as prose poetry, short essays and other works of creative fiction and nonfiction. The term flash implies fast, impromptu, and short format.

The term flash prose is generally used in the context of writing competitions or other public exhibitions of creativity or skill with language such as weblogs or non-journalistic writing in, for example, a daily, a journal or another type of periodical.

"Judith Kitchen and Mary Paumier Jones," according to Dinty W. Moore, started the flash prose "ball rolling. Their anthology, In Short, published by W. W. Norton in 1996, was an immediate influence on nonfiction writers, and is still widely taught."

== See also ==
- Prose poetry
- Flash fiction
- Creative nonfiction
- Vignette
