= Low comedy =

Works intended to provoke laughter without intellectual or other motives

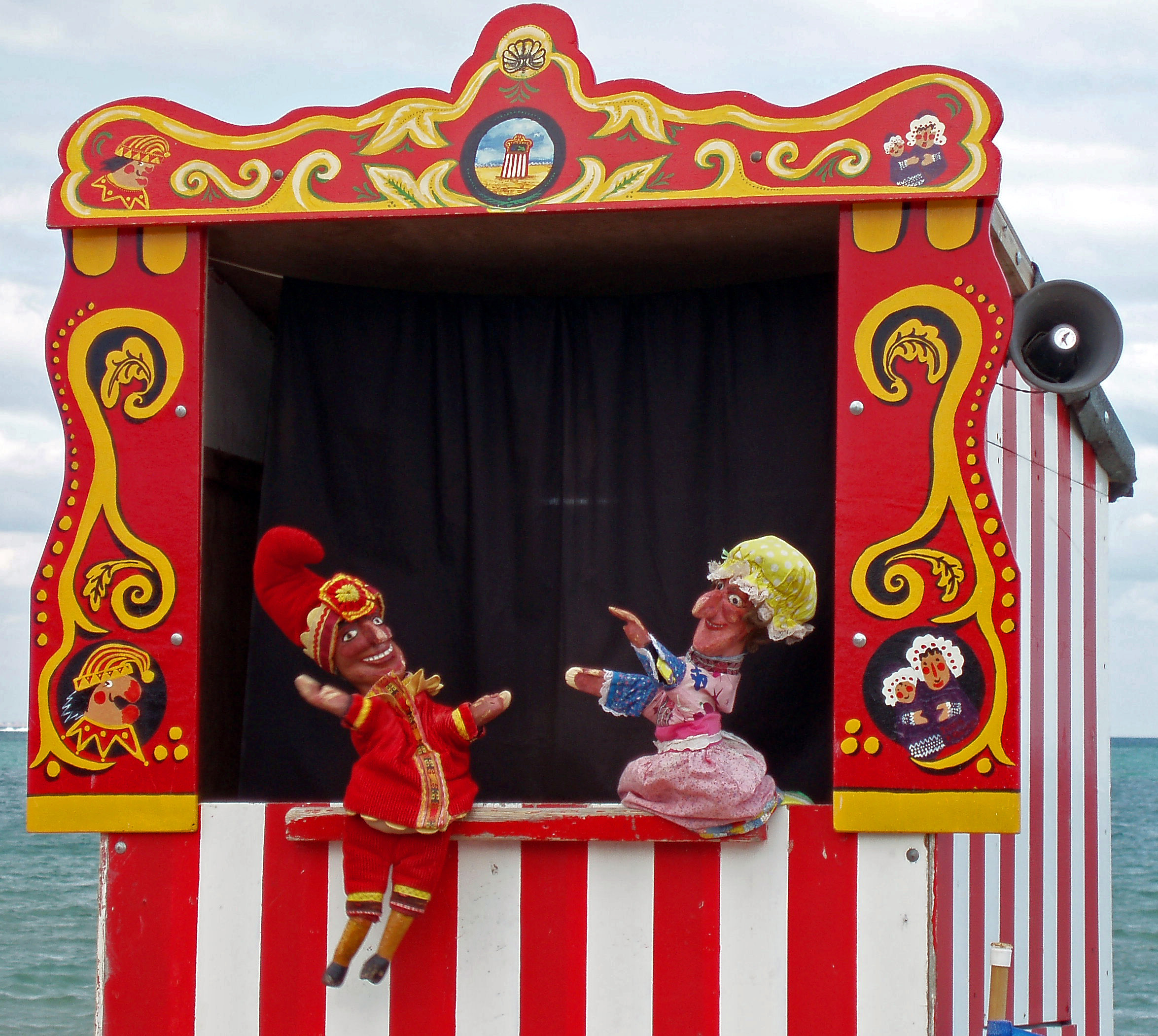
A traditional Punch and Judy booth, at Swanage, Dorset, England

Low comedy, or lowbrow humor, is a type of comedy that is a form of popular entertainment without any primary purpose other than to create laughter through boasting, boisterous jokes, drunkenness, scolding, fighting, buffoonery and other riotous activity. It is characterized by "horseplay", slapstick or farce. Examples include the throwing of a custard pie into someone's face. The definition has expanded to include obvious physical jokes, such as the wedgie.

The term "low comedy" was coined by John Dryden in his preface to his play An Evening's Love.

== History ==
This type of comedy has been a fixture ever since Greek plays. For instance Sophocles once wrote a satyr play, no longer extant, about satyrs who seek to persuade a king that they are worthy suitors of his daughter by bragging about their capacity for flatulence. Aristophanes claimed that he hoped his plays would not be too highbrow for the common people to understand though he acknowledged that his work presupposed a level of intelligence that was not normally assumed. Even the word 'comedy' is derived from a Greek phrase meaning either Song of Revelry or Song of The Village, the latter of which implies that it is meant for everyone including the lowest common denominator.

Low comedy was first denoted as comedy for the commoners because it was most often practiced by street performers. Over time, as low comedy began to include lewd jokes and more physical comedy, more mainstream performers began to practice this type of comedy: stand-up comedians, musicals, etc. This type of comedy also was employed in most cartoons. For instance, in Porky's Duck Hunt, Porky Pig is routinely subjected to physical slapstick. A 1945 Bugs Bunny cartoon which parodied and lampooned Hermann Göring included a scene wherein Bugs successfully tore off Göring's medals one by one and Göring's trousers fell off. Likewise Daffy Duck is routinely shot by Elmer Fudd in "wabbit season" cartoons.

== Social context ==
Low comedy in society is quite well known; it can be found in a wide range of media, such as television and theatre. It can also be found in public and occupations, such as clowns, mimes and comedians. The term low is represented in association to low culture. This form of comedy is targeted and understood towards people who attain nonacademic high school education, meaning this form of comedy is not restricted to high levels of education and knowledge. Low comedy is well known and popular today because it is considered suitable for all individuals. This form of comedy connects to popular culture by its easy to understand style.

Low comedy, however, has lacked appreciation from most of society and is looked down upon in contrast to high comedy. The sole purpose of low comedy is to evoke laughter in people. Because there is no contextual message in most forms of low comedy, it is not highly respected. This does not undermine the fact that it is still an effective form of comedy for its reputation to cause laughter.

The classification of things considered to be low comedy constantly changes over time. As society changes, so do the ideas about what high and low comedy is. Some sitcoms are somewhere in between low and high comedy. For instance the animated series The Simpsons routinely includes slapstick violence, yet has also satirized political issues and parodied classic films and literature.

Today, low comedy can be seen in almost any production. Sitcoms often base most of the plot on this type of comedy because of society influencing productivity and considering it a low form of comedy. Modern adaptations of Shakespeare's plays also use low comedy to convey a different understanding of the play. As You Like It for example is the story of a woman named Rosalyn who meets her male love interest while disguised as a man and inadvertently arouses the affection of a woman named Phoebe who repeatedly rejects her male suitor because she is in love with the man that Rosalyn is pretending to be.

== See also ==
- Flatulence humor
- High comedy
- The Three Stooges, three comedic performers who used primarily slapstick humor. They have been described as "the high priests of low comedy.
