= Eye rhyme =

Type of rhyme

An eye rhyme, also called a visual rhyme or a sight rhyme, is a rhyme in which two words are spelled similarly but pronounced differently. An example is the words "cough" and "dough", which despite sharing the ough ending do not form a rhyme (being pronounced /kɒf/ and /doʊ/ respectively).

Many older English poems, particularly those written in Early Modern and Middle English, contain rhymes that were originally true or full rhymes, but as read by modern readers, they are now eye rhymes because of shifts in pronunciation, especially the Great Vowel Shift. These are called historic rhymes. Historic rhymes are used by linguists to reconstruct pronunciations of old languages, and are used particularly extensively in the reconstruction of Old Chinese, whose writing system does not allude directly to pronunciation.

== Historic rhymes ==
One example of a historic rhyme (i.e., one that was a true rhyme but is now an eye rhyme) is the following:

The great man down, you mark his favourite flies;
The poor advanced makes friends of enemies.

— Player King, in William Shakespeare, Hamlet, act III, scene II

When Hamlet was written c. 1600, "flies" and "enemies" rhymed in local dialects, but as a result of the shifts in pronunciation since then, the original rhyme has been lost.

Another example of a historic rhyme is the following:

Here thou, great Anna! whom three realms obey;
Dost sometimes counsel take—and sometimes tea.

— Alexander Pope, The Rape of the Lock, canto III

When the poem was published in 1712, the word "tea" (which is only attested in English from about 60 years before) was often pronounced "tay", as it still is in certain dialects; the pronunciation "tee" predominated from the mid-18th century.

=== Conventional historic rhymes ===
Historic rhymes that were lost phonetically in the Great Vowel Shift were sometimes retained as conventional rhymes. For example, in 1940, W. H. Auden wrote:

Let the Irish vessel lie,
Emptied of its poetry.

— "In Memory of W. B. Yeats"

This represents the same historic rhyme as "flies" and "enemies" above, even though by the 20th century "lie" and "poetry" had long since ceased to rhyme. (When Auden himself read the poem aloud, he pronounced "lie" and "poetry" in the usual, non-rhyming 20th-century fashion.)

Similarly, although the noun "wind" shifted to its modern pronunciation during the 1700s, it remained a convention to rhyme it as though it were pronounced "wined", so that in 1896, Ernest Dowson wrote:

I have forgot much, Cynara! gone with the wind,
Flung roses, roses riotously with the throng,
Dancing, to put thy pale, lost lilies out of mind...

— "Non sum qualis eram bonae sub regno Cynarae"

== See also ==
- Eye dialect
- Spelling pronunciation
