= Preludes (poem) =

Poem by T. S. Eliot

"Preludes" is a poem by T. S. Eliot, composed between 1910 and 1911. It is in turns literal and impressionistic, exploring the sordid and solitary existences of the spiritually moiled as they play out against the backdrop of the drab modern city. In essence, it is four poems rather than one, and it is duly labelled as such. Preludes comes to just 54 lines and its four parts are uneven, irregular and written in free verse symptomatic of the speaker's stream of consciousness. Part I is thirteen lines, part II ten, part III fifteen and part IV sixteen.

The somewhat abstracted and fragmented description of "Preludes" appears frequently in Eliot's poetry, and although it can be hard to discern the purpose of each individual image, they add up to a whole greater than the sum of its parts.

The images in the first stanza of "Preludes" set the context for the rest of the poem: "grimy scraps / Of withered leaves" (6-7), "newspapers from vacant lots" (8), "broken blinds and chimney-pots" (10) are the dingy, littered, concrete objects of the city.

In the second stanza, "The morning comes to consciousness / Of faint stale smells of beer" (14-15), hungover, and the narrator "thinks of all the hands / That are raising dingy shades / In a thousand furnished rooms" (21-23). These last three lines underscore a sense of anonymity (and insignificance) in numbers, dirty vulgarity, and impermanence.

The third stanza introduces the first actual character of the poem in the second person, implicating the reader in the grimy, low urbanity. The soul of this "you" is constituted of a "thousand sordid images" (27) and the soles of "your" feet are yellowed and "your" hands are soiled (37-38), either by physical labor, the dirt and grime of the city, or both. The use of the second person here closes the distance between the poem and the reader, but the degrading, accusatory manner in which it does so perhaps alienates the reader as well. The only redemption in the scene described is found in sunlight and birdsong, which are both jarringly undercut: "light crept up between the shutters, / And you heard the sparrows in the gutters" (31-32). The light is not liberating and illuminating; it creeps and is obstructed. The birdsong comes not from a traditional songbird, but from sparrows—the mice of the bird world—in the gutters of the street.

The poem is a condemnation of modernity, and specifically of urban life. It mainly highlights the boredom of life, with allusions to prostitutes and other grimy scenes to further enhance the disorienting nature of the world in such a time.
