= Vers de société =

Term for social or familiar poetry

Vers de société (French pronunciation: [vɛʁ də sɔsjete]), a term for social or familiar poetry, which was originally borrowed from the French, came to rank as an English expression.

== History ==
=== In France ===
The use of the phrase in English is first met with at the opening of the 19th century. It is to be observed that it has come to bear a meaning which is not wholly equivalent to that of the French original. It was said of the blind philosopher, Charles de Pougens (1755–1833), that his petits vers de société procured great success for him in the salons of Paris, and several of the rhymesters of the early 18th century were prominent for their adroitness in composing petits vers sur des sujets legers.

The prince of such graceful triflers was the Abbé de Chaulieu (1639–1720), of whom it was said that he made verses solely for the amusement of his friends, and without the smallest intention of seeing them in print. The best of his effusions have preserved a certain freshness because of the neatness with which they are turned, but it can scarcely be said that they have any pretension to be called poetry. They were inspired by incidents in the private life of the day, and were largely addressed to a few friends of exalted rank, who were hardly less witty than the author himself, such as the Duc de Nevers, the Marquis de Lassay, the Duchesse de Bouillon and the Marquis de La Fare.

In the collections of Chaulieu's works, which were very often reprinted, side by side with his own pieces will be found petits vers de société indited by these great friends of his, and often quite as well-turned as his own. To write such verses, indeed, was almost an accomplishment of good breeding. An enormous collection of them was brought together by Titon du Tillet (1676–1762), in his Parnasse français, where those who are curious on the subject may observe to satiety how ingenious and artificial and trifling the vers de société of the French 18th century could be.

The fashion for them followed upon the decline of an interest in rondeaux, ballades and villanelles, and Chaulieu himself had not a little to do with throwing those ingenuities out of fashion, his attack on Benserade, who went so far as to turn the whole of Ovid's Metamorphoses into rondeaux being, according to his editor of 1732, the first work which displayed the delicacy of the Abbé de Chaulieu's taste, and his talent for poetry. Of the writers of vers de société in France, J.-B. Rousseau had the most poetical faculty; he was, in fact, a poet, and he wrote a Billet à Chaulieu which is a gem of delicate and playful charm. But, as a rule, the efforts of the French versifiers in les petits genres were not of much poetic value.

=== In England ===
If in England the expression vers de société carried with it more literary dignity, this is mainly due to the genius of one man, Matthew Prior. Prior's Poems on Several Occasions, collected in 1709, presents us with some of the earliest entirely characteristic specimens of vers de société, and with some of the best. Here the poet consciously, and openly, relinquishes the pretension of high effort and an appeal to Parnassus. He is paying a visit at Burghley House, where the conversation turns on the merits and adventures of Mr Fleetwood Shepherd; Prior then and there throws off, in extremely graceful verse, a piece appropriate to the occasion. He addresses it, and he dates it to May 14, 1689; and this is a typical example of vers de société.

It will be seen that Prior, who learnt much from his residence in the heart of the French world of fashion between 1711 and 1715, treats very much the same subjects as Chaulieu and La Fare were treating, but he does so with more force of style and dignity of imagination. As the 18th century progressed, the example of Prior was often followed by English poets, without, however, any general recapture of his forcible grace. The vers de société tended to be merged in the epistle and in the epigram. Swift, however, when he was neither coarse nor frigid, sometimes achieved genuine success, as in the admirable verses on his own death. The odes of Ambrose Philips (1671–1749) addressed by name to various private persons, and, most happily, to children, were not understood in his own age, but possess some of the most fortunate characteristics of pure vers de société.

In his Welcome from Greece, a study in ottava rima, Gay produced a masterpiece in this delicate class, but most of his easy writings belong to a different category. Nothing of peculiar importance detains us until we reach Cowper, whose poems for particular occasions, such as those on Mrs Throckmorton's Bullfinch and The Distressed Travellers, are models of the poetic use of actual circumstances treated with an agreeable levity, or an artful naïvety. In a later age, Byron, who excelled in so many departments of poetry, was an occasional writer of brilliant vers de société, such as the epistle Huzza, Hodgson, but to find a direct successor to Prior it is necessary to pass Henry Luttrell and W. R. Spencer, and to come down to W. M. Praed. A certain character was given to English vers de société by Hood and R. H. Barham, but the former was too much addicted to a play upon words, the latter was too boisterous, to be considered as direct continuers of the tradition of Prior.

That tradition, however, was revived by Frederick Locker-Lampson, whose London Lyrics, first printed in 1857 and constantly modified until 1893, is in some respects the typical modern example of pure vers de société. He was a simple, clear and easy writer; he successfully avoided the least appearance of that effort which is fatal to this kind of verse. His Rotten Row, with its reminiscences of the early 1860s, "But where is now the courtly troop / That once rode laughing by? / I miss the curls of Cantelupe, / The laugh of Lady Di, / Touches of real portraiture"—is a perfect example of vers de société. Since the days of Locker, those who have attempted to strike the lighter lyre in English have been very numerous. Almost immeasurably superior to the rest was Austin Dobson, who is, however, something more than a writer of vers de société.

Written during the 20th Century, Philip Larkin's poem entitled 'Vers de Société' is a more caustic example.

== Bibliography ==
Collections of vers de société were published by J. K. Stephen (1859–92), Andrew Lang (1844–1912), A. D. Godley (1856–1925), Owen Seaman (1861–1936) and A. R. Ross (1859–1933).
