= Contrast (literary) =

In literature, an author uses contrast when they describe the difference(s) between two or more entities. It is common in many works of literature.

For example, The Pearl by John Steinbeck, contrasts the members of the society of La Paz. The working class citizens live in brush houses, their economic activity is fishing and they are sociable. They are represented by the protagonist, Kino, and the other fishermen. On the other hand, the middle class citizens live in plastered buildings and they engage in exploitative economic activities such as quack medicine and trading in pearls. The story presents a dramatic conflict between them as an example of class struggle.

In addition, in the first four lines of William Shakespeare's Sonnet 130, Shakespeare contrasts a mistress to the sun, coral, snow, and wire.

Contrast is the antonym of simile. In poetic compositions, it is common for poets to set out an elaborate contrast or elaborate simile as the argument. For example, John Donne and the metaphysical poets developed the conceit as a literary device, where an elaborate, implausible, and surprising analogy was demonstrated. In Renaissance poetry, and particularly in sonnets, the contrast was similarly used as a poetic argument. In such verse, the entire poem argues that two seemingly alike or identical items are, in fact, quite separate and paradoxically different. These may take the form of my love is unlike all other women or I am unlike her other loves.

In the early 18th century, a theory of wit developed by English writers (particularly John Locke) held that judgement sees the differences in like things, or imagination or fancy sees the likeness in different things, and wit operates properly by employing judgement and fancy to form sound propositions. In lyric poetry, the author is often attempting to show how what seems to be solely an exercise of judgement or fancy is, in fact, wit.
