= Verse paragraph =

Verse paragraphs are parts of poems that have no regular number of lines or groups of lines that make up units of sense, unlike stanzas. They are usually separated by blank lines. It stands for a group of lines in a poem that form a rhetorical unit similar to that of a prose paragraph.

Milton's Paradise Lost and Wordsworth's The Prelude consist of verse paragraphs.

Verse paragraphs are frequently used in blank verse and in free verse.
