= Loose sentence =

Type of sentence

A loose sentence (also called a cumulative sentence) is a type of sentence in which the main idea (independent clause) is elaborated by the successive addition of modifying clauses or phrases.

== Construction ==
It adds modifying elements after the subject, complement, and verb.

== Effect ==
Loose sentences may make a work seem informal, relaxed, and conversational. However, according to Strunk and White's The Elements of Style (2000), a succession of loose sentences, especially those of two clauses, is to be avoided because of "mechanical symmetry and sing-song".

== Examples ==
- "Bells rang, filling the air with their clangor, startling pigeons into flight from every belfry, bringing people into the streets to hear the news." (From the English Reviewer)
- She drove her car to go to the movies, and she got gas.
- "I have been assured by a very knowing American friend of my acquaintance in London, that a young healthy child well nourished is at a year old a most delicious, nourishing, and wholesome food, whether stewed, roasted, baked or boiled; and I make no doubt it will equally serve in a fricassee or a ragout." Jonathan Swift, A Modest Proposal

== Alternatives ==
Stunk and White, in The Elements of Style believe one should recast enough of them to remove the monotony, replacing them by simple sentences, by sentences of two clauses joined by a semicolon, by periodic sentences of two clauses, by sentences, loose or periodic, of three clauses—whichever best represent the real relations of the thought.

For example, if the writer wanted to rewrite the above examples, he could write:

- Bells rang. Their resonance filled the air with clangor, startling pigeons into flight from every belfry. Upon hearing the sounds, the townspeople rushed into the streets. They all stood in silence and awaited the news.
- She drove to the movies. Afterward, she went to the gas station to fill up.

== See also ==
- The Elements of Style
