= Rhyme Genie =

- Developer: Idolumic
- Release: September 9, 2009; 17 years ago
- Stable release: 9.0 / September 22, 2017; 9 years ago
- Operating system: Mac OS X, iOS, Microsoft Windows
- Size: 250MB download
- Available in: English
- Type: Music Software
- License: Proprietary
- Website: www.rhymegenie.com

Rhyme Genie is a rhyming dictionary software developed by Idolumic for the Mac OS X, iOS and Microsoft Windows platforms. Initially released in 2009 it was introduced as the world's first dynamic rhyming dictionary with 30 different rhyme types, 300,000 entries and more than 9 million phonetic references. One of the software's main features is an intelligent rhyme algorithm that enables users to find near rhymes, also referred to as half or slant rhymes, by adjusting the similarity in sound between the search word and prospective rhyme mates.

== Rhyme types ==
Rhyme Genie can find 26 traditional types of rhymes, 2 phonetic algorithms (Metaphone, Soundex) and 2 proprietary rhyme algorithms (Related Rhyme, Intelligent Rhyme) to offer a total of 30 different rhyme types:

Additive Rhyme, Alliteration, Amphisbaenic Rhyme, Apocopated Rhyme, Assonance, Broken Rhyme, Consonance, Diminished Rhyme, Double Assonance, Double Consonance, Elided Rhyme, Family Rhyme, Feminine Pararhyme, Final Syllable Rhyme, First Syllable Rhyme, Full Assonance, Full Consonance, Half Double Rhyme, Homophone, Intelligent Rhyme, Light Rhyme, Metaphone, Pararhyme, Perfect Rhyme, Related Rhyme, Reverse Rhyme, Rich Rhyme, Soundex, Trailing Rhyme, Weakened Rhyme

== Development history ==
Rhyme Genie 1.0 was released in September 2009 to introduce the first generation of the intelligent rhyme and an integrated thesaurus with 2.5 million synonyms. Further incremental updates have added support for heteronyms, a wordfilter with over 100,000 parts of speech and a redesigned multi-syllabic option that allows the intelligent rhyme to automatically switch to monosyllabic rhymes whenever a search word does not produce rhyme mates that match two or more syllables.

Rhyme Genie 2.0 was released in May 2010 to introduce a selectable songwriter dictionary compiled from more than 100 million words in over 600,000 song lyrics. An updated intelligent rhyme algorithm now distinguishes between primary and secondary stress in words to find more near rhymes with greater accuracy.

Rhyme Genie 3.0 was released in January 2011 to introduce a thesaurus that not only matches the meaning but also the number of syllables of words.

Rhyme Genie 4.0 was released in January 2012 to introduce a new accompanying songwriting software named TuneSmith that is able to run the Mac version of the rhyming dictionary as a plug-in. Developed by Idolumic, TuneSmith includes an advanced lyrics editor, a copyright tracker and a pitch journal to assist songwriters in the creation and administration of their songs. TuneSmith's copyright tracker enables users to track the writer and publisher portions of copyright splits and oversee copyright registrations of added songs. An integrated audio recorder can capture melodies or maintain commercially released studio recordings in AIFF, WAVE or MP3. In addition, a pitch journal allows songwriters to track hold periods, release dates and chart positions of pitched songs.

== See also ==
- List of music software
