= List of English words without rhymes =

The following is a list of English words without rhymes, called refractory rhymes—that is, a list of words in the English language that rhyme with no other English word. The word "rhyme" here is used in the strict sense, called a perfect rhyme, that the words are pronounced the same from the vowel of the main stressed syllable onwards. The list was compiled from the point of view of Received Pronunciation (with a few exceptions for General American), and may not work for other accents or dialects. Multiple-word rhymes (a phrase that rhymes with a word, known as a phrasal or mosaic rhyme), self-rhymes (adding a prefix to a word and counting it as a rhyme of itself), imperfect rhymes (such as purple with circle), and identical rhymes (words that are identical in their stressed syllables, such as bay and obey) are often not counted as true rhymes and have not been considered. Only the list of one-syllable words can hope to be anything near complete; there are many disyllabic or polysyllabic words without rhymes.

== Definition of perfect rhyme ==
Following the strict definition of rhyme, a perfect rhyme demands the exact match of all sounds from the last stressed vowel to the end of the word. Therefore, words with the stress far from the end are more likely to have no perfect rhymes. For instance, a perfect rhyme for discomBOBulate would have to rhyme three syllables, -OBulate. There are many words that match most of the sounds from the stressed vowel onwards and so are near rhymes, called slant rhymes. Ovulate, copulate, and populate, for example, vary only slightly in one consonant from discombobulate, and thus provide very usable rhymes for most situations in which a rhyme for discombobulate is desired. However, no other English word has exactly these three final syllables with this stress pattern. And since in most traditions the stressed syllable should not be identical—the consonant before the stressed vowel should be different—adding a prefix to a word, as be-elbow for elbow, does not create a perfect rhyme for it.

Words that rhyme in one accent or dialect may not rhyme in another. A commonplace example of this is the word of /ɒv/, which when stressed had no rhymes in British Received Pronunciation prior to the 19th century, but which rhymed with grave and mauve in some varieties of General American. In the other direction, iron has no rhyme in General American, but many in RP. Words may also have more than one pronunciation, one with a rhyme, and one without.

== Non-rhyming English words ==
The majority of words with antepenultimate stress, such as ambulance, citizen, dangerous and obvious, are non-rhyming. Also, most words with preantepenultimate stress, such as (un)necessary, logarithm, algorithm and sacrificing, have no rhyme.

=== Masculine rhymes ===
Refractory one-syllable rhymes are uncommon; there may be fewer than a hundred in English. A great many end in a present or historical suffix -th, or are plural or participle forms. This list includes a few polysyllabic masculine rhymes such as obliged, which have one syllable in their rhyming part.

1. adzed /ˈ-ædzd/
2. alb /-ælb/ (rhymes with some pronunciations of the proper noun "Kalb" in the name of Johann de Kalb)
3. amongst /-ʌŋst/ ("quincunxed" qualifies apart from the final syllable being unstressed)
4. angsts /ˈ-æŋksts/
5. bilge /ˈ-ɪldʒ/
6. boinged /ˈ-ɔɪŋd/
7. breadth, -s /ˈ-ɛdθ, -s/
8. bronzed /ˈ-ɒnzd/
9. bulb, -s, -ed /ˈ-ʌlb, -z, -d/
10. calced /ˈ-ælst/ (may rhyme with "valsed" in British English, according to the Oxford English Dictionary)
11. combs (combinations) /ˈ-ɒmbz/
12. coolth /ˈ-uːlθ/
13. corpsed /ˈ-ɔːrpst/
14. delft /ˈ-ɛlft/
15. depth, -s /ˈ-ɛpθ, -s/
16. dumbth /ˈ-ʌmθ/
17. eighth, -s /ˈ-eɪtθ, -s/
18. excerpts (verb) /ˈ-ɜːrpts/
19. false /ˈ-ɔːls/
20. fifth, -ed, -s /ˈ-ɪfθ, -t, -s/ (has rhymes for those who drop the f or th)
21. filmed /ˈ-ɪlmd/
22. glimpsed /ˈ-ɪmpst/
23. goonch /ˈ-ʊntʃ/
24. gouge(d) /ˈ-aʊdʒ/
25. (en)gulfed /ˈ-ʌlft/
26. kilned /ˈ-ɪlnd/ (but not when pronounced as /ˈ-ɪld/)
27. kirsch /ˈ-ɪərʃ/
28. midsts /ˈ-ɪdsts/
29. mulcts /ˈ-ʌlkts/
30. ninth, -s /ˈ-aɪnθ, -s/
31. obliged /ˈ-aɪdʒd/
32. obvs /ˈ-ɒbvz/
33. oomph /ˈ-uːmf/
34. prompts /ˈ-ɒmts/ or /ˈ-ɒmpts/
35. scarce /ˈ-ɛərs/
36. sculpts /ˈ-ʌlpts/
37. sixth, -s /ˈ-ɪk(s)θ, -s/
38. sowthed, southed /ˈ-aʊθt/
39. spoilt /ˈ-ɔɪlt/
40. stilb /ˈ-ɪlb/
41. sudsed /ˈ-ʌdzd/
42. swoln /ˈ-oʊln/
43. timesed /ˈ-aɪmzd/
44. traipsed /ˈ-eɪpst/
45. twelfth, -s /ˈ-ɛlfθ, -s/ The "f" in "twelfth" is commonly elided in casual speech, causing "twelfth" to rhyme with "health" and "wealth".
46. unbeknownst /ˈ-oʊnst/
47. vuln, -ed, -s /ˈ-ʌln, -d, -z/
48. warmth /ˈ-ɔːrmθ/
49. whilst /ˈ-aɪlst/
50. with /ˈ-ɪð/ (the word is also pronounced with /ˈ-ɪθ/, in which case it has rhymes like "pith")
51. wolf, -ed, -s /ˈ-ʊlf, -t, -s/
52. wolve, -d, -s /ˈ-ʊlv, -d, -z/
53. worlds /ˈ-ɜːrldz/
54. wounds /ˈ-uːndz/

pork /ˈ-oʊrk/ and forge /ˈ-oʊrdʒ/ have no rhymes in conservative RP. However, the distinction between horse and hoarse has been mostly lost in younger generations, and for them and many others pork which was an exception to the normal rule, now rhymes with fork and cork (/ˈ-ɔːrk/), while forge now rhymes with gorge. The OED no longer lists /pɔək/ as an alternative pronunciation in its third edition.

Nonce words ending in -ed ('provided with') may produce other potentially refractory masculine rhymes. There are additional words which are only partially assimilated into English, such as Russian kovsh /ˈkɒvʃ/, which are refractory rhymes.

The contraction daren't /ˈ-ɛərnt/ has no known rhymes in any English dialect, however the legitimacy of contractions as a single word is disputed. Regardless of this, daren't lacks both perfect rhymes and phrasal rhymes.

Although not meant as a complete list, there are some additional refractory rhymes in GA. Some of these are due to RP being a non-rhotic accent, and having merged rhymes formerly distinguished by /r/.

1. heighth, -s /ˈ-aɪtθ, -s/
2. iron /ˈ-aɪərn/
3. karsts /ˈ-ɑːrsts/

=== Feminine rhymes ===
For feminine rhymes, the final two syllables must match to count as a rhyme. Once the stress shifts to the penultimate syllable, rhymeless words are quite common. The following words are representative, but there are thousands of others.

1. angel
2. angry
3. anxious
4. comment
5. empty
6. engine
7. foible
8. foyer
9. hundred(th)
10. husband
11. liquid
12. luggage
13. monster
14. nothing
15. olive
16. penguin
17. polka
18. problem
19. sanction
20. sandwich
21. secret
22. something
23. zigzag

== Words with obscure perfect rhymes ==
This list includes rhymes of words that have been listed as rhymeless.

=== Masculine rhymes ===
- airt (rhymes with the Scots pronunciations of various other words, e.g. "pairt", a Scots variant of "part", and "smairt", a Scots variant of "smart")
- aitch /ˈ-eɪtʃ/ rhymes with dialectal nache (the bony point on the rump of an ox or cow), Rach, a hypocoristic for the name Rachel, one pronunciation of obsolete rache (a streak down a horse's face), and the surname of Anne Heche.
- angst /ˈ-æŋkst/ rhymes with manxed and wangst, self-indulgent self-pity (a portmanteau of wank and angst); phalanxed is not a perfect rhyme because the stress is on the wrong syllable. The alternative American pronunciation /ˈɑːŋkst/ has no rhymes.
- beige /ˈ-eɪʒ/ rhymes with greige, a colour between grey and beige (though etymologically unrelated to them) and one pronunciation of manège, the art of training horses.
- blitzed /ˈ-ɪtst/ rhymes with spritzed, from spritz, to squirt with water or mist, schizzed as in schizzed out, and one pronunciation of "midst".
- boing, -s /ˈ-ɔɪŋ, -z/ rhymes with doing (etymology 2), the sound made by an elastic object when struck by or striking a hard object, and toing/toings, the sound of a metallic vibration.
- bombed /ˈ-ɒmd/ rhymes with glommed, American slang for 'attached'.
- borscht, borshcht /ˈ-ɔːrʃt/ rhymes with dialectical warshed (washed))
- cairn rhymes with bairn, a Northern English and Scottish word meaning child; and Nairn, a town and formal royal burgh in Scotland.
- cleansed /ˈ-ɛnzd/ rhymes with lensed, "provided with a lens or lenses".
- coif /ˈ-ɔɪf/ rhymes with boyf, slang for "boyfriend".
- culm /ˈ-ʌlm/ rhymes with stulm, another word for an adit.
- cusp /ˈ-ʌsp/ rhymes with dusp, an acronym for "dual-specificity phosphatase enzyme".
- doth /ˈ-ʌθ/ rhymes with Cuth, a hypocoristic for the name Cuthbert, as in "Cuth's Day" at St. Cuthbert's Society.
- dreamt /ˈ-ɛmt/ rhymes with verklemmt, too overcome with emotion to speak. (Furthermore, if the rime is pronounced as /ˈ-ɛmpt/, it rhymes with exempt, tempt, etc.)
- else /ˈ-ɛls/ rhymes with wels, the fish Silurus glanis; and Chels, a hypocoristic for the name Chelsea.
- eth /ˈ-ɛð/ rhymes with Castilian Spanish merced, 'gift', which is occasionally used in English.
- fiends /ˈ-iːndz/ rhymes with teinds, Scottish word for the portion of an estate assessed for the stipend of the clergy, and archaic Scottish piends.
- film, -s /ˈ-ɪlm, -z/ rhymes with pilm, Scottish word for dust. The plural films rhymes with Wilms, a German surname and a kidney tumor
- flange /ˈ-ændʒ/ rhymes with sporange, another name for a sporangium; Ange, a hypocoristic for the name Angela; and one pronunciation of ganj, short for ganja.
- fourths /ˈ-ɔːrθs/ rhymes with North's, belonging to someone named North (such as Oliver North or Kanye West and Kim Kardashian's daughter North West).
- fugue, -s /ˈ-uːɡ, -z/ rhymes with jougs, which is rarely found in the singular; one pronunciation of Moog, the synthesizer brand name; Droog, the sister catalogue to Delia*s for boys; zhoug, a green Yemeni sauce; doogh, a savory Persian yogurt drink; cheug, a slang term for a person who has an outdated idea of what is trendy; the boog, short for the boogaloo movement; and Zoog Disney. The plural rhymes with the name of Zoogz Rift.
- grilse /ˈ-ɪls/ rhymes with fils (etymology 2), a hundredth or thousandth of the monetary units of many Arab countries.
- gulf, -s /ˈ-ʌlf, -s/ rhymes with sulf (pl. Sulfs), any of a number of sulfate-regulating enzymes.
- kiln, -s, if pronounced /ˈ-ɪln, -z/, rhymes with the surname Milne. The plural rhymes with Milne's, belonging to someone with the surname Milne.
- loge /ˈ-oʊʒ/ rhymes with the English pronunciation of Limoges, a city in France, and a kind of porcelain. It also rhymes with a common pronunciation of doge, especially when referring to the Internet meme.
- midst /ˈ-ɪdst/ rhymes with didst, the archaic second-person singular for did (used with thou). The alternate pronunciation /ˈmɪtst/ rhymes with blitzed and spritzed.
- month /ˈ-ʌnθ/ rhymes with oneth, a mathematical term; also en-plus-oneth (n + 1)th and compounds like ninety-oneth (= ninety-first). This also appears in fractions and so takes the plural, as in twenty thirty-oneths.
- oblige /ˈ-aɪdʒ/ rhymes with Nige, a hypocoristic for the name Nigel.
- oink, -s /ˈ-ɔɪŋk, -s/ rhymes with yoink/yoinks, a colloquial interjection expressing the stealing or sudden acquisition of something; boink/boinks, a slang word meaning "to have sex with"; and Spoink, a Pokémon species introduced in Generation III.
- pierced /ˈ-ɪərst/ rhymes with tierced, a heraldic term meaning "divided into three".
- pint /ˈ-aɪnt/ rhymes with rynt, a word milkmaids use to get a cow to move.
- plagued /ˈ-eɪɡd/ rhymes with one pronunciation of reneged meaning "went back on a promise"; and vagued, meaning "wandered/roamed" or "became vague/acted vaguely".
- plinth /ˈ-ɪnθ/ rhymes with synth, colloquial for synthesizer.
- quaich /ˈ-eɪx/ rhymes with scraich/scraigh, Scots for "to screech", and one pronunciation of abeigh, a rare Scottish word meaning "cautiously aloof".
- rouged /ˈ-uːʒd/ rhymes with luged, having ridden on a luge.
- sylph rhymes with MILF/milf, vulgar slang; and Wilf, a hypocorism for the name Wilfred.
- thesp /ˈ-ɛsp/ rhymes with hesp, a measure of two hanks of linen thread in Scotland; and Cresp, a French surname.
- torsk /ˈ-ɔːrsk/ rhymes with Norsk, a rural locality in Russia
- tufts rhymes with scufts, the third-person singular form of the dialectal verb scuft.
- waltzed /ˈ-ɔːltst/ rhymes with schmaltzed, as in "schmaltzed up" (see schmaltz).
- wasp /ˈ-ɒsp/ rhymes with knosp, "an ornament in the form of a bud or knob".
- wharves /ˈ-ɔːrvz/ rhymes with dwarves, the variant of dwarfs usually used in fantasy of the Tolkienian model. It also rhymes with corves, the plural of corf, a type of basket.
- whorl /ˈ-ɔːrl/ (when not pronounced to rhyme with curl or floral) rhymes with schorl, a variety of tourmaline.
- width /ˈ-ɪdθ/ rhymes with obsolete sidth, meaning length.
- yoicks /ˈ-ɔɪks/ rhymes with oiks, the plural of oik, a slang term for a boorish member of the lower class in the U.K. and Ireland. It also forms an identity rhyme with joiks.

=== Feminine rhymes ===
- angsty /ˈ-æŋksti/ rhymes with planxty, an Irish or Welsh melody for the harp.
- arugula /ˈ-uːɡjələ/ rhymes with Bugula, a genus of bryozoan, in American English.
- chaos /ˈ-eɪ.ɒs/ rhymes with naos, the inner chamber of a temple.
- chimney /ˈ-ɪmni/ rhymes with Jimny, a model of car from Japanese automaker Suzuki.
- chocolate /ˈ-ɒklɪt/ rhymes with rocklet. With the cot-caught merger, it also rhymes with auklet, any of the smaller species of auks.
- circle /ˈ-ɜːrkəl/ rhymes with hurkle, to pull in all one's limbs; novercal, like a stepmother; squircle, a geometric shape resembling a square with rounded edges (e.g., Lamé's special quartic); opercle, an opercular bone; and the surnames of Angela Merkel (as pronounced in English), Studs Terkel, and Steve Urkel.
- circus /ˈ-ɜːrkəs/ rhymes with murcous, having cut off one's thumb; and Quercus, a genus of oak.
- diamond /ˈ-aɪmənd/ rhymes with hymened, having a hymen of a specified description, as in the word tough-hymened.
- elbow /ˈ-ɛlboʊ/ rhymes with the surname of Vivian Selbo.
- music /ˈ-juːzɪk/ rhymes with anchusic, as in anchusic acid; dysgeusic, having a disorder that causes alterations in one's sense of taste; ageusic, lacking a sense of taste; and sheltopusik, a lizard of Europe and Central Asia.
- neutron /ˈ-uːtrɒn/, in American English, rhymes with Lutron, an electronics company based in Coopersburg, Pennsylvania.
- ninja, -s /ˈ-ɪndʒə, -z/ rhymes with Rohingya, a minority group in Myanmar, and Shinja, a Christian who practices martial arts (in rhotic accents such as General American; in non-rhotic accents such as RP, these words also rhyme with ginger, injure, etc.).
- opus (with a short O), /ˈ-ɒpəs/, rhymes with Hoppus, a method of measuring timber and surname of Mark Hoppus, lead singer of Blink-182; and, in American English, one pronunciation of tapas, Mexican finger food.
- orange /ˈ-ɒrɪndʒ/, rhymes with "door hinge" in certain accents; Blorenge, a hill in Wales; and "blorange", slang for a hair color between blond and orange. Webster's Third gives two pronunciations for sporange, one of which rhymes. However, one is a spelling pronunciation based on orange, and the OED only has the non-rhyming pronunciation, with the stress on the ange : /spɒˈrændʒ/. The American pronunciation of orange with one syllable has no rhyme, even in non-rhotic accents.
- plankton /ˈ-æŋktən/ rhymes with Yankton, a member of a western branch of the Dakota people and several American place names named after the people.
- poem /ˈ-oʊəm/, in American English, rhymes with the Hebrew names Noam, Jeroboam and Rehoboam; no'm, a dialectal contraction for "no, ma'am"; or with phloem (/ˈfləʊ.əm/) (pronunciations vary).
- poet /ˈ-oʊ.ɪt/ rhymes with coit, to have sex.
- purple /ˈ-ɜːrpəl/ rhymes with curple, the hindquarters of a horse or donkey, hirple, to walk with a limp, nurple, the act of roughly twisting a nipple (slang).
- rhythm /ˈ-ɪðəm/ rhymes with Lytham, a seaside town in England; and smitham, fine malt or ore dust.
- silver /ˈ-ɪlvər/ rhymes with chilver, a female lamb.
- siren /ˈ-aɪrən/ rhymes with gyron, a type of triangle in heraldry; environ, meaning to encircle or surround; the given names Byron and Myron; and apeiron, meaning infinity.
- soldier /ˈ-oʊldʒər/ rhymes with the surnames Bolger and Folger
- toilet /ˈ-ɔɪlɪt/ rhymes with oillet, an eyelet; and Coylet, a hamlet in Argyll and Bute.
- woman /ˈ-ʊmən/ rhymes with toman (some pronunciations), a Persian coin and military division.
- yttrium /ˈ-ɪtriəm/ rhymes with liberum arbitrium, a legal term.

== See also ==
- List of closed pairs of English rhyming words
