= Hemistich =

Poetic form

A hemistich (/ˈhɛmɪstɪk/; via Latin from Greek ἡμιστίχιον, from ἡμι- "half" and στίχος "verse") is a half-line of verse, followed and preceded by a caesura, that makes up a single overall prosodic or verse unit. In Latin and Greek poetry, the hemistich is generally confined to drama. In Greek tragedy, characters exchanging clipped dialogue to suggest rapidity and drama would speak in hemistichs (in hemistichomythia). The Roman poet Virgil employed hemistichs in the Aeneid to indicate great duress in his characters, where they were incapable of forming complete lines due to emotional or physical pain.

In neo-classicism, the hemistich was frowned upon (e.g. by John Dryden), but Germanic alliterative verse employed the hemistich as a basic component of verse. In Old English and Old Norse poetry, each line of alliterative verse was divided into an "a-verse" and "b-verse" hemistich with a strong caesura between. In Beowulf, there are only five basic types of hemistich, with some used only as initial hemistichs and some only as secondary hemistichs. Furthermore, Middle English poetry also employed the hemistich as a coherent unit of verse, with both the Pearl Poet and Layamon using a regularized set of principles for which metrical (as well as alliterative) forms were allowed in which hemistich position.

In Arabic and Persian poetry, a line of verse almost invariably consists of two hemistichs of equal length, forming a couplet. In some kinds of Persian and Arabic poetry, known as mathnawi or masnavi, the two hemistichs of a line rhyme with the scheme AA BB CC DD. In other kinds, such as the ruba'i, qasida, or ghazal, the rhyme scheme is AA BA CA DA, with the same rhyme used for the second hemistich of every couplet.

== See also ==
- antilabe
- dropped line
