= Rhyming dictionary =

Specialist dictionary designed for use in writing poetry and lyrics

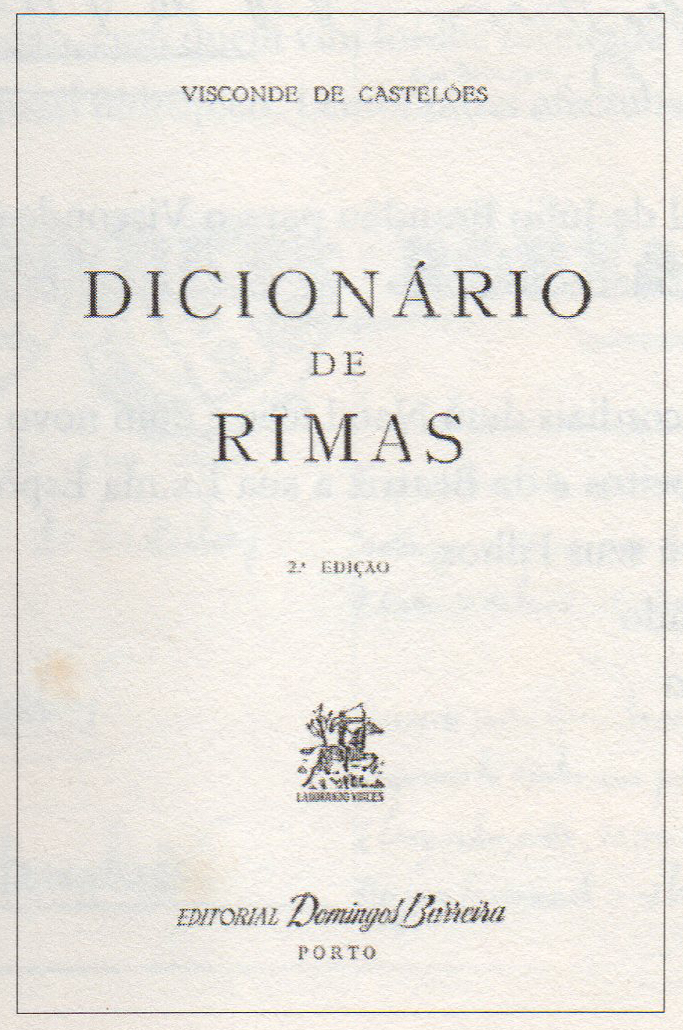
Dicionário de Rimas, Portuguese-language dictionary of rhymes.

A rhyming dictionary is a specialized dictionary designed for use in writing poetry and lyrics. In a rhyming dictionary, words are categorized into equivalence classes that consist of words that rhyme with one another. They also typically support several different kinds of rhymes and possibly also alliteration as well.

Because rhyming dictionaries are based on pronunciation, they are difficult to compile. Words and rhyming patterns change their pronunciation over time and between dialects. Rhyming dictionaries for Old English, Elizabethan poetry, or Standard English would have quite different content. Rhyming dictionaries are invaluable for historical linguistics; as they record pronunciation, they can be used to reconstruct pronunciation differences and similarities that are not reflected in spelling.

A simple reverse dictionary, which collates words starting from the end, provides a rough rhyming dictionary to the extent that spelling follows pronunciation. However, a precise rhyming dictionary reflects pronunciation, not spelling.

Today, there are many websites on the internet that provide the same function as rhyming dictionaries.

== Examples ==
- Rhyme Genie
- Walker's Rhyming Dictionary

== See also ==
- Rime dictionary, an ancient type of Chinese dictionary
- List of closed pairs of English rhyming words
