= Multisyllabic rhymes =

Rhymes containing two or more syllables

In rapping and poetry, multisyllabic rhymes (also known as compound rhymes, polysyllable rhymes, and sometimes colloquially in hip-hop as multis) are rhymes that contain two or more syllables An example is as follows:

This is my last race / I’m at a fast pace

Multisyllabic rhyme is used extensively in hip-hop, and is considered a hallmark of complex and advanced rapping, and artists are often praised for their multisyllabic rhymes by critics and fellow rappers. This is in contrast to its use in the majority of other forms of poetry, where multisyllabic rhyme is rarely used, apart from in comic verse where it is used for comic effect by poets such as Ogden Nash.

== Usage in hip-hop ==
Multisyllabic rhymes are one of several rhyming devices which have increased in usage throughout the history of rapping, along with such devices as internal rhymes and offbeat rhymes. Music scholar Adam Krims, writing in 2001, noted the following artists as exemplifying the increased complexity in rhyming, including use of multisyllabic rhyming: “members of the Wu-Tang Clan, Nas, AZ, Big Pun, Ras Kass, and Elzhi, just to name a few”.

Multisyllabic rapping is often included in hardcore, gangsta or mafioso rap and is sometimes included in mainstream hip-hop music. Examples of multisyllabic rhymes being included in mainstream hip-hop music include rapper AZ's 1995 single "Sugar Hill", Big Pun's 1997 single "Still Not a Player", and Cuban Link's "Sugar Daddy" single from 2005.

Some MCs have used multisyllabic rhymes consisting of five or more rhyming syllables. For example, on MF Doom's song "Meat Grinder", from the album Madvillainy, he raps: "Borderline schizo / Sorta fine tits though."

== Usage in poetry ==
Lord Byron (1788–1824) used multisyllabic rhymes in his satiric poem Don Juan. For example, he rhymes "intellectual" with "hen-peck'd you all".

Ogden Nash (1902–1971) used multisyllabic rhymes in a comic, satirical way, as is common in traditional comic poetry. For example, in his poem ‘The Axolotl’ he rhymes "axolotl" with "whaxolotl".

Gerard Manley Hopkins (1844–89) is one of few poets who used multisyllabic rhymes to convey non-satirical subject matter. An example of this is ‘The Bugler's First Communion’, where he rhymes "boon he on" with "Communion".

== See also ==
- Feminine rhyme
- Rhyme Genie
