= Rime riche =

Type of rhyme

Rime riche (French pronunciation: [ʁim ʁiʃ]) is a form of rhyme with three identical sounds (phoneme) including the stressed vowel. In classical French poetry (between Malherbe and Romanticism) rhymes normally have to be visual too: both sound and spelling have to be identical.

In French poetry, rhymes are usually classified on the basis of the number of rhyming sounds. A "rime pauvre" ("poor rhyme") includes one common sound at the end of the two rhyming segments. Consonant sounds do not rhyme on their own (duc does not rime with donc despite the identical single consonant /k/ at the end) and so a "rime pauvre" must be a vocalic sound. In the following example of "rime pauvre" by Racine in Andromaque, the rhyming sound is /y/; identically spelt "-ue":

(...) ma vengeance est perdue,

s'il ignore en mourant que c'est moi qui le tue.

A "rime suffisante" ("sufficient rhyme") includes two identical sounds, one of which must be a vowel. Two consecutive vowel sounds being extremely rare in French, "rimes suffisantes" are usually in the vowel-consonant or consonant-vowel format. In the following example of "rime suffisante" by Racine in Britannicus, /ne/ are the two rhyming sounds, identically spelt "-nés".

Au joug depuis longtemps, ils se sont façonnés;

Ils adorent la main qui les tient enchaînés.

A "rime riche" ("rich rhyme") includes three identical sounds. In the following example of "rime riche" by Racine in Phèdre, /aʃe/ are the three rhyming sounds, identically spelt "-achée" .

Ce n'est plus une ardeur dans mes veines cachée,

C'est Vénus tout entière à sa proie attachée.

Rhymes over three identical sounds are sometimes called "rimes léonines".

== See also ==
- Holorime, an extreme form of rime riche when two entire lines of verse have identical sounds
- Perfect rhyme, when rhyming words or phrases have identical sounds except the leading articulation
