= Perfect and imperfect rhymes =

Types of rhyme

Perfect rhyme (also called full rhyme, exact rhyme, or true rhyme) is a form of rhyme between two words or phrases, satisfying the following conditions:

- The stressed vowel sound in both words must be identical, as well as any subsequent sounds. For example, the words kit and bit form a perfect rhyme, as do spaghetti and already in American accents.
- The onset of the stressed syllable in the words must differ. For example, pot and hot are a perfect rhyme, while leave and believe are not.

Word pairs that satisfy the first condition but not the second (such as the aforementioned leave and believe) are technically identities (also known as identical rhymes or identicals). Homophones, being words of different meaning but identical pronunciation, are an example of identical rhyme.

== Imperfect rhyme ==
Half rhyme, imperfect rhyme, false rhyme, bastard rhyme, near-rhyme, lazy rhyme, or slant rhyme, is a type of rhyme formed by words with similar but not identical sounds. In most instances, the vowel segments are different and the consonants are identical or vice versa. This type of rhyme is also called approximate rhyme, inexact rhyme, imperfect rhyme (in contrast to perfect rhyme), off rhyme, analyzed rhyme, suspended rhyme, or sprung rhyme.

=== Use in popular music ===
==== Rock and punk ====
In the 1977 song "God Save the Queen" by the English punk rock band the Sex Pistols, the authors create a rhyme with the lines "God save the queen" and "the fascist regime".

The 1979 song "Up the Junction" by the English new wave band Squeeze makes extensive use of half-rhyme. The opening verse, for example:

I never thought it would happen
With me and a girl from Clapham
Out on the windy common
That night I ain't forgotten

==== Hip hop and rap ====
Half rhyme is often used, along with assonance, in rap music. That can be used to avoid rhyming clichés (e.g., rhyming knowledge with college) or obvious rhymes and can give the writer greater freedom and flexibility in forming lines of verse. Additionally, some words have no perfect rhyme in English, necessitating the use of slant rhyme. The use of half rhyme may also enable the construction of longer multisyllabic rhymes than is otherwise possible.

In the following lines from the song "N.Y. State of Mind" by the rapper Nas, the author uses half rhyme in a complex cross rhyme pattern:

And be prosperous, though we live dangerous
Cops could just arrest me, blamin' us, we're held like hostages

=== Unconventional exceptions ===
The children's nursery rhyme This Little Piggy displays an unconventional (in most modern dialects) slant rhyme. Home is rhymed with none. This is because in Early modern English these words often rhymed. In some dialects of Northern England English, these still rhyme.

This little piggy stayed (at) home...this little piggy had none.

In The Hives' song "Dead Quote Olympics", the singer Howlin' Pelle Almqvist rhymes idea with library:

This time you really got something, it's such a clever idea
But it doesn't mean it's good because you found it at the libra-ri-a

== See also ==
- Holorime
- Internal rhyme
- Monorhyme
- Rime riche

== Sources ==
- Smith, M., Joshi, A. (2020). Rhymes in the Flow: How Rappers Flip the Beat. United States: University of Michigan Press.
- The Princeton Handbook of Poetic Terms: Third Edition. (2016). United States: Princeton University Press.
- Lasser, M. (2019). City Songs and American Life, 1900-1950. United Kingdom: University of Rochester Press.
- Barnes, W. (1854). A Philological Grammar: Grounded Upon English, and Formed from a Comparison of More Than Sixty Languages. Being an Introduction to the Science of Grammar and a Help to Grammars of All Languages, Especially English, Latin and Greek. United Kingdom: J. R. Smith.
- Stoker, J. (2015). Slant Rhyme. United Kingdom: Xlibris US.
