= Burn Center (poem) =

Poem by Sharon Olds

"Burn Center" is a poem written by American poet Sharon Olds, and is a part of Olds's poetry collection "The Dead & The Living", published February 12, 1984, and has also been published in the October 1981 edition of Poetry. "The Dead & The Living" was chosen for the 1983 Lamont Poetry Selection and won the National Book Critics Circle Award. The volume itself has sold over 50,000 copies and is known to be one of the best-selling contemporary works of poetry. Her works have been praised for their ability to show the "unpoetic" events that happen in life and turn them into emotional personal poetry. Topics of her poetry mainly cover family life with its struggles being the center focus and she also takes on political global events. For "Burn Center", the reader sees into Olds's fragile relationship with her mother, but she's been known to talk about the dysfunctional relationship between her and both of her parents.

== Themes of love and violence ==
Olds reflects her family life in her poems. She talks about emotional, verbal, and physical abuse by both men and women. The men were typically more violent in a physical manner. Women imposed more of emotional abuse onto the narrator, which was something that Olds has experience with. "In ‘Burn Center’, Olds's mother burned her with her love because she loved from the distance of her own needs; she may fund a burn center in a hospital, but it is too late to do her daughter any good." Since a complicated relationship is shown in the poem between the mother and daughter, there's this emphasization of pairing love with violence and the contrast seems to show that not every relationship, even those between parent and child, are ideal. Even though there's established compassion between the two, there is still violence. Lines 16 to 20 The mom hurts the daughter: “...but when I would cry out she would hold me to her/ hot griddle, when my scorched head stank she would/ draw me deeper into the burning/room of her life”. This explains the mother's love is linked to violence because when the daughter cries out for help, her mother pulls her close but it ends up burning her, or hurting her, instead of healing her.

== Reception to themes ==
Olds received fairly positive and accepting reception from her works, receiving praise and applause from many. “Her poetry is...uncompromisingly honest on the subject of the abuse she claims to have received from her parents as a child. Rather than throwing a lasso around that anger and pulling in it tight or crafting arrows to direct at the real target, the poetry of Olds is a textbook example of the power of creative sublimation.” By taking themes and applying them to other characters and stories, she is able to convey parts of her life onto other characters and uses them as a means to a cry for help. Instead of being direct with what happened to her growing up, she creates beautiful poetry but uses those feelings to characterize a narrator or protagonist, not herself. She pushes those feelings onto other character.

== Structure and method ==
“Burn Center" is one medium-length stanza comprising 29 lines of various lengths. Olds utilizes enjambment by cutting her lines off within the sentences, making the reader proceed to the next line to get the rest of the idea or thought. Olds uses commas extensively to draw out each of the four sentences, adding dependent and independent clauses to strategically reveal information.
