= Line (poetry) =

Subdivision of a poem

A line is a unit of writing into which a poem or play is divided: literally, a single row of text. The use of a line operates on principles which are distinct from and not necessarily coincident with grammatical structures, such as the sentence or single clauses in sentences. Although the word for a single poetic line is verse, that term now tends to be used to signify poetic form more generally. A line break is the termination of the line of a poem and the beginning of a new line.

The process of arranging words using lines and line breaks is known as lineation, and is one of the defining features of poetry. A distinct numbered group of lines in verse is normally called a stanza. A title, in certain poems, is considered a line.

== General conventions in Western poetry ==
Conventions that determine what might constitute line in poetry depend upon different constraints, aural characteristics or scripting conventions for any given language. On the whole, where relevant, a line is generally determined either by units of rhythm or repeating aural patterns in recitation that can also be marked by other features such as rhyme or alliteration, or by patterns of syllable-count.

In Western literary traditions, use of line is arguably the principal feature which distinguishes poetry from prose. Even in poems where formal metre or rhyme is weakly observed or absent, the convention of line continues on the whole to be observed, at least in written representations, although there are exceptions (see Degrees of license). In such writing, simple visual appearance on a page (or any other written layout) remains sufficient to determine poetic line, and this sometimes leads to the suggestion that the work in question is no longer a poem but "chopped up prose". A dropped line is a line broken into two parts, with the second indented to remain visually sequential.

In the standard conventions of Western literature, the line break is usually but not always at the left margin. Line breaks may occur mid-clause, creating enjambment, a term that literally means 'to straddle'. Enjambment "tend[s] to increase the pace of the poem", whereas end-stopped lines, which are lines that break on caesuras (thought-pauses often represented by ellipsis), emphasize these silences and slow the poem down.

Line breaks may also serve to signal a change of movement or to suppress or highlight certain internal features of the poem, such as a rhyme or slant rhyme. Line breaks can be a source of dynamism, providing a method by which poetic forms imbue their contents with intensities and corollary meanings that would not have been possible to the same degree in other forms of text.

Distinct forms of line, as defined in various verse traditions, are usually categorised according to different rhythmical, aural or visual patterns and metrical length appropriate to the language in question. (See Metre.)

One visual convention that is optionally used to convey a traditional use of line in printed settings is capitalisation of the first letter of the first word of each line regardless of other punctuation in the sentence, but it is not necessary to adhere to this. Other formally patterning elements, such as end-rhyme, may also strongly indicate how lines occur in verse.

In the speaking of verse, a line ending may be pronounced using a momentary pause, especially when its metrical composition is end-stopped, or it may be elided such that the utterance can flow seamlessly over the line break in what can be called run-on.

When verse is quoted within sentences in prose articles or critical essays, line breaks can be indicated by the forward slash (/); for example: "What in me is dark,/ Illumine, what is low raise and support,/ That to the height of this great argument/ I may assert eternal Providence,/ And justify the ways of God to men." (Milton, Paradise Lost). A stanza break can be indicated by the forward slash doubled (//).

== Degrees of license ==
In more "free" forms, and in free verse in particular, conventions for the use of line become, arguably, more arbitrary and more visually determined such that they may only be properly apparent in typographical representation and/or page layout.

One extreme deviation from a conventional rule for line can occur in concrete poetry where the primacy of the visual component may over-ride or subsume poetic line in the generally regarded sense, or sound poems in which the aural component stretches the concept of line beyond any purely semantic coherence.

At another extreme, the prose poem simply eschews poetic line altogether.

== Examples of line breaks ==
scolds Forbid
den Stop
Must
n't Don't

— E. E. Cummings

The line break 'must/n't' allows a double reading of the word as both 'must' and 'mustn't', whereby the reader is made aware that old age both enjoins and forbids the activities of youth. At the same time, the line break subverts 'mustn't': the forbidding of a certain activity—in the poem's context, the moral control the old try to enforce upon the young—only serves to make that activity more enticing.

While Cummings's line breaks are used in a poetic form that is intended to be appreciated through a visual, printed medium, line breaks are also present in poems predating the advent of printing.

=== Shakespeare ===
Examples are to be found, for instance, in Shakespeare's sonnets. Here are two examples of this technique operating in different ways in Shakespeare's Cymbeline:

In the first example, the line break between the last two lines cuts them apart, emphasizing the cutting off of the head:

With his own sword,

Which he did wave against my throat, I have ta'en

His head from him.

— William Shakespeare, Cymbeline

In the second example, the text before the line break retains a meaning in isolation from the contents of the new line. This meaning is encountered by the reader before it being modified by the text after the line break, which clarifies that, instead of "I, as a person, as a mind, am 'absolute,'" it 'really' means: "I am absolutely sure it was Cloten":

I am absolute;
'Twas very Cloten.

— William Shakespeare, Cymbeline

== Metre ==
In every type of literature there is a metrical pattern that can be described as "basic" or even "national". The most famous and widely used line of verse in English prosody is the iambic pentameter, while one of the most common of traditional lines in surviving classical Latin and Greek prosody was the hexameter. In modern Greek poetry hexameter was replaced by line of fifteen syllables. In French poetry alexandrine is the most typical pattern. In Italian literature the hendecasyllable, which is a metre of eleven syllables, is the most common line. In Serbian ten syllable lines were used in long epic poems. In Polish poetry two types of line were very popular, an 11-syllable one, based on Italian verse and 13-syllable one, based both on Latin verse and French alexandrine. Classical Sanskrit poetry, such as the Ramayana and Mahabharata, was most famously composed using the 32-syllable verse, derived from the Vedic anuṣṭubh metre called shloka.

- English iambic pentameter:

Like to Ahasuerus, that shrewd prince,
I will begin — as is, these seven years now,
My daily wont — and read a History
(Written by one whose deft right hand was dust
To the last digit, ages ere my birth)
Of all my predecessors, Popes of Rome:
For though mine ancient early dropped the pen,
Yet others picked it up and wrote it dry,
Since of the making books there is no end.

(Robert Browning, The Ring and the Book 10, Book The Pope, lines 1-9)

- Latin hexameter:

Arma virumque canō, Trōiae quī prīmus ab orīs
Ītaliam, fātō profugus, Lāvīniaque vēnit
lītora, multum ille et terrīs iactātus et altō
vī superum saevae memorem Iūnōnis ob īram;
multa quoque et bellō passūs, dum conderet urbem,
inferretque deōs Latiō, genus unde Latīnum,
Albānīque patrēs, atque altae moenia Rōmae.

(Virgil, Aeneid, Book I, lines 1-7)

- French alexandrine:

Comme je descendais des Fleuves impassibles,
Je ne me sentis plus guidé par les haleurs :
Des Peaux-Rouges criards les avaient pris pour cibles,
Les ayant cloués nus aux poteaux de couleurs.

(Arthur Rimbaud, Le bateau ivre, lines 1-4)

- Italian hendecasyllable:

Per me si va ne la città dolente,
per me si va ne l'etterno dolore,
per me si va tra la perduta gente.

Giustizia mosse il mio alto fattore;
fecemi la divina podestate,
la somma sapïenza e ’l primo amore.

(Dante Alighieri, Divina commedia, Inferno, Canto III, lines 1-6)

Pioneers of the freer use of line in Western culture include Whitman and Apollinaire.

== Characteristics ==
Where the lines are broken in relation to the ideas in the poem it affects the feeling of reading the poetry. For example, the feeling may be jagged or startling versus soothing and natural, which can be used to reinforce or contrast the ideas in the poem. Lines are often broken between words, but there is certainly a great deal of poetry where at least some of the lines are broken in the middles of words: this can be a device for achieving inventive rhyme schemes.

In general, line breaks divide the poetry into smaller units called lines (this is a modernisation of the term verse), which are often interpreted in terms of their self-contained meanings and aesthetic values: hence the term "good line". Line breaks, indentations, and the lengths of individual words determine the visual shape of the poetry on the page, which is a common aspect of poetry but never the sole purpose of a line break. A dropped line is a line broken into two parts, in which the second part is indented to remain visually sequential through spacing. In metric poetry, the places where the lines are broken are determined by the decision to have the lines composed from specific numbers of syllables.

Prose poetry is poetry without line breaks in accordance to paragraph structure as opposed to stanza. Enjambment is a line break in the middle of a sentence, phrase or clause, or one that offers internal (sub)text or rhythmically jars for added emphasis. Alternation between enjambment and end-stopped lines is characteristic of some complex and well composed poetry, such as in Milton's Paradise Lost.

A new line can begin with a lowercase or capital letter. New lines beginning with lowercase letters vaguely correspond with the shift from earlier to later poetry: for example, the poet John Ashbery usually begins his lines with capital letters prior to his 1991 book-length poem "Flow-Chart", whereas in and after "Flow-Chart" he almost invariably begins lines with lowercase letters unless the beginning of the line is also the beginning of a new sentence. There is, however, some much earlier poetry where new lines begin with lowercase letters.

Beginning a line with an uppercase letter when the beginning of the line does not coincide with the beginning of a new sentence is referred to by some as "majusculation". (this is an invented term derived from majuscule). The correct term is a coroneted verse.

In T.S. Eliot's The Waste Land, where ambiguity abounds, a line break in the opening (ll. 5–7) starts things off.

Winter kept us warm, covering

Earth in forgetful snow, feeding

A little life with dried tubers.

Because the lines start with capitalized letters, Eliot could be saying "Earth" as the planet or "earth" as the soil.

== See also ==
- Active listening
- Caesura
- Canons of page construction
- Ellipsis
- Enjambment
- Graphic design
- Part (music)
- Pausa
- Principles of organization
- Repetition (music)
- Run-on sentence
