= Stichomythia =

Technique in verse drama

Stichomythia (Ancient Greek: στιχομυθία, romanized: stikhomuthía) is a technique in verse drama in which sequences of single alternating lines, or half-lines (hemistichomythia) or two-line speeches (distichomythia) are given to alternating characters. It typically features repetition and antithesis. The term originated in the theatre of Ancient Greece, though many dramatists since have used the technique. Etymologically it derives from the Greek stikhos ("row, line of verse") + muthos ("speech, talk").

Stichomythia is particularly well suited to sections of dramatic dialogue where two characters are in violent dispute. The rhythmic intensity of the alternating lines combined with quick, biting ripostes in the dialogue can create a powerful effect.

== In Ancient Greek drama ==
Stichomythia originated in Greek drama, where, in the early plays of Aeschylus it applies to exchanges between the protagonist and the chorus. Adolf Gross concludes that stichomythia developed from choral response. J. Leonard Hancock differs in this regard, not finding overwhelming evidence for any particular origin theory, but admitting that the role of musical symmetry must have been significant. Instead he finds that the trends, within Ancient Greek aesthetics, toward agonistic expression, subtlety in language, and love of symmetry, helped to give rise to stichomythia as a popular dialogue device.

== In Seneca ==
Senecan stichomythia, while ultimately derived from Athenian stichomythia (as Roman theatre is derived from Greek theatre generally) differs in several respects. First, Seneca uses the technique less than all but the earliest extant pieces of classical Greek tragedy. Secondly, the stichomythic form found in Seneca is less rigid. Finally, and most substantially, Seneca's tragedies are much more prone to revolve around literary quibbles, even leaving aside the plot of the play for entire sections while the characters engage in an essentially linguistic tangent.

== In more recent theatre ==
Renaissance Italian and French drama developed in many respects as an imitation of the classic drama of the Greeks and Romans. Stichomythic elements, however, were often absent. Where they did occur, they tended to follow the lead of Seneca in using “catchwords” as launching points for each subsequent line.

Modern theatre rarely uses verse, so any construct that depends on verse, such as stichomythia, is also rare. Where a form of stichomythia has been used, the characters involved are typically building subsequent lines on the ideas or metaphors of previous lines, rather than words.

== General trends ==
In terms of character relationships, stichomythia can represent interactions as mundane as question-and-answer exchanges, or as tense as heated rapid-fire arguments. While the equal line lengths can create a sense of equality of voice between the characters, stichomythia can also feature one character silencing another with a vociferous rebuff, especially where one character's line interrupts the other's.

In terms of how stichomythia moves forward as a section of dialogue, the Ancient Greeks tended to favor subtle flavorings and reflavorings of grammatical particles, whereas Senecan (and by extension Renaissance) stichomythic passages often turned on verbal minutiae or “catchwords”. Modern theatre, on the other hand, uses the technique in such a manner that the characters use each line to add depth to a shared idea or metaphor.

== Examples ==
=== Sophocles ===
A short example from R. C. Jebb's translation of Antigone: the scene is an argument between Ismene and her sister Antigone. For further examples from Antigone, consult the text at the Internet Classics Archive .

ISMENE: And what life is dear to me, bereft of thee?
ANTIGONE: Ask Creon; all thy care is for him.
ISMENE: Why vex me thus, when it avails thee nought?
ANTIGONE: Indeed, if I mock, 'tis with pain that I mock thee.
ISMENE: Tell me,—how can I serve thee, even now?
ANTIGONE: Save thyself: I grudge not thy escape.
ISMENE: Ah, woe is me! And shall I have no share in thy fate?
ANTIGONE: Thy choice was to live; mine, to die.
ISMENE: At least thy choice was not made without my protest.
ANTIGONE: One world approved thy wisdom; another, mine.

=== Shakespeare (an example of hemistichomythia) ===
Richard III, Act I, Scene ii. Richard Plantagenet, Earl of Gloucester (later Richard III of England) threatens to kill himself unless Lady Anne, widow of Prince Edward (of Lancaster), agrees to marry him.

LADY ANNE: I would I knew thy heart.
GLOUCESTER: 'Tis figured in my tongue.
LADY ANNE: I fear me both are false.
GLOUCESTER: Then never man was true.
LADY ANNE: Well, well, put up your sword.
GLOUCESTER: Say, then, my peace is made.
LADY ANNE: That shall you know hereafter.
GLOUCESTER: But shall I live in hope?
LADY ANNE: All men, I hope, live so.
GLOUCESTER: Vouchsafe to wear this ring.
LADY ANNE: To take is not to give.

GLOUCESTER: Sweet saint, for charity, be not so curst.
LADY ANNE: Foul devil, for God's sake, hence, and trouble us not,

In Hamlet, Act III, Scene iv (the Closet scene), Hamlet is confronted by his mother, the queen, about the play (III, ii) which Hamlet rigged to expose his murderous step-uncle.

QUEEN: Hamlet, thou hast thy father much offended.
HAMLET: Mother, you have my father much offended.
QUEEN: Come, come, you answer with an idle tongue.
HAMLET: Go, go, you question with a wicked tongue.

In The Merchant of Venice, Act IV, Scene i, Shylock and Bassanio enter into an argument using stichomythia at 4.1.65-9, which "catches the dramatic tension of a quasi-forensic interrogation":

SHYLOCK: I am not bound to please thee with my answers.
BASSANIO: Do all men kill the things they do not love?
SHYLOCK: Hates any man the thing he would not kill?
BASSANIO: Every offence is not a hate at first.
SHYLOCK: What, wouldst thou have a serpent sting thee twice?

A further intensification is often achieved by antilabe, in which a single verse line is distributed on alternating speakers.

=== Corneille ===
An exchange in Le Cid (1.3.215–226), by Pierre Corneille, has been called "an excellent instance of Corneille's skilful handling of 'stichomythia'". Don Diègue (an old man, the hero's father) has been appointed the prince's tutor, a post that the Count (le Comte) wanted.

LE COMTE: Ce que je méritois, vous avez emporté.
DON DIÈGUE: Qui l'a gagné sur vous l'avoit mieux merité.
LE COMTE: Qui peut mieux l'exercer en est bien le plus digne.
DON DIÈGUE: En être refusė n'est pas un bon signe.
LE COMTE: Vous l'avez eu par brigue, ėtant vieux courtisan.
DON DIÈGUE: L'éclat de mes hauts faits fut mon seul partisan.
LE COMTE: Parlons-en mieux, le Roi fait honneur a votre âge.
DON DIÈGUE: Le Roi, quand il en fait, le mesure au courage.
LE COMTE: Et par là cet honneur n'était dû qu'à mon bras.
DON DIÈGUE: Qui n'a pu l'obtenir ne le méritoit pas.
LE COMTE: Ne le méritoit pas! Moi?
DON DIÈGUE: Vous.
LE COMTE: Ton impudence,
Téméraire viellard, aura son récompense. [Il lui donne un soufflet

=== Musical drama ===
In the scene in Wolfgang Amadeus Mozart's opera The Marriage of Figaro, libretto by Lorenzo Da Ponte, where Susanna learns that Marcellina is Figaro's mother, she repeats her disbelief (Sua madre?, that is, "his mother?") to each character and is reassured in the same words. A critic has called that "the merriest and most congenial form imaginable" of stichomythia. For another example from opera, the following passage from the libretto by Andrea Maffei for Giuseppe Verdi's I masnadieri has been called "musical stichomythia", though it does not contain repetition or antithesis:

AMALIA: Qual mare, qual terra da me t'ha diviso?
CARLO: Deh! cessa, infelice, l'inchiesta crudel!
AMALIA: Mendaci novelle ti dissero ucciso.
CARLO: Beato se chiuso m'avesse l'avel!
AMALIA: Tu pure, o mio Carlo, provasti gli affanni?
CARLO: Li possa il tuo core per sempre ignorar!
AMALIA: Anch'io, derelitta, ti piansi lung'anni.
CARLO: E un angelo osava per me lagrimar?

Examples from musicals are "I Remember it Well" (lyrics by Alan Jay Lerner, first version in the Broadway musical Love Life, second in the film Gigi) and "Anything You Can Do" (by Irving Berlin, from Annie Get Your Gun). Another is from "The Last Supper" in Jesus Christ Superstar. When Judas says Jesus knows who will betray him, a passage of stichomythia (with a two-line interruption) follows:

Jesus: Why don't you go do it?
Judas: You want me to do it!
Jesus: Hurry, they're waiting
Judas: If you knew why I do it...
Jesus: I don't care why you do it
Judas: To think I admired you,
for now I despise you
Jesus: You liar—you Judas

=== Film ===
In the prose context of most film, stichomythia has been defined as a "witty exchange of one-liners" and associated with the film noir characters Jeff Bailey in Out of the Past, Sam Spade, and Philip Marlowe. Another film-noir example is in Double Indemnity (dialog by Billy Wilder and Raymond Chandler). Walter Neff flirts with Phyllis Dietrichson; she resists him.

Dietrichson: You were anxious to talk to [my husband] weren't you?
Neff: Yeah, I was, but I'm sort of getting over the idea, if you know what I mean.
Dietrichson: There's a speed limit in this state, Mr. Neff, 45 miles an hour.
Neff: How fast was I going officer?
Dietrichson: I'd say around 90.
Neff: Suppose you get down off your motorcycle and give me a ticket?
Dietrichson: Suppose I let you off with a warning this time?
Neff: Suppose it doesn't take?
Dietrichson: Suppose I have to whack you over the knuckles?
Neff: Suppose I bust out crying and put my head on your shoulder?
Dietrichson: Suppose you try putting it on my husband's shoulder?
Neff: That tears it!
