= Amphisbaenic rhyme =

Rhyming word pattern

Amphisbaenic rhyme describes a pair of words that create an agreement in sound if the sequence of the letters in one of the words is reversed. The term refers to the amphisbaena serpent in classical mythology. The serpent had a head at each end of its body and therefore was able to move forwards and backwards. In its simplest form the amphisbaenic rhyme consists of the same word spelled backwards (step/pets). Less obvious variations match the sound of one or more syllables of a rhyme mate with the sound of an inverted word or syllable (day/masquerade).

== Examples ==
In Ab-Soul's Album DWTW, there is a song titled RAW/WAR. -RapGenius

In the 1948 poem “The Pickerel Pond: A Double Pastoral.” Edmund Wilson used the amphisbaenic rhyme to symbolize the mirror reflection of the pond’s environment.

The lake lies with never a ripple,
A lymph to lave sores from a leper:

The sand white as salt in an air
That has filtered the tamed every ray;

Below limpid water, those lissome
Scrolleries scribbled by mussels;

The floating dropped feathers of gulls;
A leech like a lengthening slug

[...]

Though the term was first coined in Wilson's collection of poetry, this rhyme scheme first saw use from the 1942 collection of Filipino poet Jose Garcia Villa. Villa refers to this backwards rhyme scheme as "reverse consonance" rather than amphisbaenic. Villa accused Wilson of plagiarizing this rhyme scheme, naming it amphisbaenic in order to evade giving credit to the earlier work, "Have Come, Am Here". This controversy was met with a reply from Wilson stating that he has never read any of Villa's work..

== See also ==
- Rhyme
