= Smitham =

Small lumps of ore historically scavenged due to tax exemption

Smitham is the small lumps of ore which free miners scavenged because they were exempt from payment of lot and cope duties. This practice was brought to an end in 1760 when the Duke of Devonshire challenged the practice in chancery on the basis that mine owners were breaking larger lumps down to avoid taxation.

Smitham rhymes with rhythm and together they are the only ɪðəm perfect rhymes.
