= Off-centered rhyme =

An off-centered rhyme is an internal rhyme scheme characterized by placing rhyming words or syllables in unexpected places in a given line. This is sometimes called a misplaced-rhyme scheme or a spoken-word rhyme style. Here is an example from the hip-hop group De La Soul:

Playin' wait up, with the data servin' your ears
with information due to confirmation of the nation's most
wicked ways of livin', like them glassy eyed beans
Inhale to smoke the fiends, while bangin' a tape
Rated at the high point of the mass
Rippin' MC's at the top of a class, occasionally
rippin' some sucker's face, or some suckable ass from a girl
It's a big brother beat for the wide wide world [emphasis added]

This is a common rhyme scheme found in the spoken word form of poetry and can also be found in hip-hop to a lesser degree.
