= Antilabe =

Rhetorical figure which a single phrase is said in two parts by different characters

Antilabe (from the Greek: ἀντι "mutually" or "corresponding", λαβή, "grip" or "handle") is a rhetorical technique in verse drama or closet drama, in which a single verse line of dialogue is distributed on two or more characters, voices, or entities. The verse usually maintains its metric integrity, while the line fragments spoken by the characters may or may not be complete sentences. In the layout of the text the line fragments following the first one are often indented ("dropped line") to show the unity of the verse line.

BRUTUS:

Peace then. No words.

CLITUS:

I'll rather kill myself.

— Shakespeare, Julius Caesar

These are three sentences spoken by two persons. But it is only one single line in blank verse:

Peace then. No words. I'll rather kill myself.

== In Ancient Greek drama ==
"The device originated in classical tragedy as a means of heightening dramatic tension." "It figures in almost all the plays of Sophocles and Euripides. It renders dialogue less stately and more agitated: the technique is well suited to scenes of excitement, in which one speaker is repeatedly capping, countering or following up the ideas of another." In Sophokles’ Oedipus, for example, "as Kreon seizes Antigone (832), they break into an excited lyrical strophe, full of antilabe in which Oedipus, Kreon, and the chorus participate." "In Electra (1502-3), antilabe occurs as Orestes tries to induce Aegisthys to enter the house so that Orestes can kill him." "[Antilabe is] used with particular freedom in late Euripides." "In the plays of Aeschylus, with the possible exception of Prometheus Bound (line 980), this phenomenon does not occur."

== In Seneca drama ==
"Dialogic exchanges using both stichomythia and antilabe are common in Seneca. They occur in all the tragedies except Phoenissae."

== In Renaissance drama ==
David Eggenberger notes that "[the device] was frequently utilized by Renaissance dramatists."

An extreme example from Shakespeare is (in response to the King's cryptic command 'Death'):

My lord?

A grave.

He shall not live.

Enough!

— King John, 3.3
