= -th =

The English suffix -th may form:

- ordinal numerals
- verbal nouns
- the archaic 3rd person singular form, see Early Modern English
