= Vivian Selbo =

Vivian Selbo (born 1958) is an American contemporary digital media artist who works as the design director for Slate.

== Background ==
Selbo graduated from the University of Wisconsin, Madison, and the Independent Study Program of the Whitney Museum of American Art in New York City. She has taught at the School of Visual Arts, the Banff Center for the Arts, and New York University. She lives and works in New York City.

== Career ==
Selbo worked as the interface director for äda'web, the Walker Art Center's "pioneering Web site of online art curated by Benjamin Weil" from 1994 to 1998. In an essay written in September 1998, Selbo described äda'web as "a research and development platform, a digital foundry, and a journey" in which "artists are invited to experiment with and reflect upon the web as a medium, and as a means of distribution for their work."

Besides digital media, Selbo has also worked with photographic sculpture. She "adapted text and images from commercial sources, setting up situations that are loaded, provocative, and funny, often putting issues of seduction and desire into play. She alludes to obsessive consumption of media imagery, and speaks with the subtle innuendoes of advertising."

Selbo has created sites and web works for clients such as the Museum of Modern Art (MoMA), the San Francisco Museum of Modern Art (SFMoMA), the Walker Art Center, CalArts' Center for Integrated Media, the Visual Arts Department at the University of California, San Diego, PBS/POV, Visual Understanding in Education, and Eyebeam, among others. Her artworks are included in the collections of the Walker Art Center and SFMoMA.

== Works ==
- a word from our sponsor (1995) - a series of 8" x 10" black and white photographs
- Enclosed Caption Viewing
- killer @pp: it's all t@lk! - the first part of an online project called partsofspeech
- Vertical Blanking Interval, 1996 — Selbo's project for äda'web, launched in December 1996. The title describes "the largely untapped portion of the video spectrum that is part of any television signal. This portion of the signal is where high speed internet access will soon be transmitted."
- InterNyet: A Video Curator's Dispatches from Russia & Ukraine at the New York Museum of Modern Art

Selbo also produced a portion of Predictive Engineering.2 by Julia Scher at the San Francisco Museum of Modern Art.
