= Dropped line =

Technique in typesetting poetry

In poetry, a dropped line is a line which is broken into two lines, but where the second part is indented to the horizontal position it would have had as an unbroken line.

For example, in the poem "The Other Side of the River" by Charles Wright, the first and second lines form a dropped line, as do the fourth and fifth lines:

It's linkage I'm talking about,

and harmonies and structures,

And all the various things that lock our wrists to the past.
Something infinite behind everything appears,

and then disappears.

— Charles Wright, The Other Side of the River

== Use in modern poetry ==
Dropped lines have a variety of functions and uses. It may be used to determine the visual appearance of the line as a whole. Wright, for example, uses dropped lines to reference landscape paintings, especially by Paul Cézanne and Giorgio Morandi, explaining why his use of dropped line "can be seen as imitating the sense of horizontal rhythm prevalent in paintings by Cézanne." Modern poets who are known for using dropped lines include Wright, Carl Phillips, and Edward Hirsch.

== Use in dramatic texts ==
Lines which are broken between two voices, as in the first two lines in the following scene in Hamlet, may also be called dropped lines. In this case, the line is broken to reflect a change in character while preserving a steady iambic pentameter across the entire line. In classical tragedy this technique of dividing a single verse line between two or more characters is called antilabe and functions "as a means of heightening dramatic tension." It was "frequently utilized by Renaissance dramatists" such as Shakespeare:

HAMLET

Did you not speak to it?

MARCELLUS

My lord, I did;

But answer made it none: yet once methought
It lifted up its head and did address
Itself to motion, like as it would speak;

— William Shakespeare, Hamlet, Act I, Scene II
