= List of closed pairs of English rhyming words =

This page has a list of closed pairs of English rhyming words—in each pair, both words rhyme with each other and only with each other.

== Monosyllabic pairs ==
- bairn, cairn
- boosts, roosts
- coaxed, hoaxed
- dwarfed, morphed
- how've, Lauv
- lounge, scrounge
- lymph, nymph
- palped, scalped
- salve, valve
- smooth, soothe

== Disyllabic pairs ==
=== Trochaic pairs ===
In a trochaic pair, each word is a trochee, with the first syllable stressed and the second syllable unstressed.

- agile, fragile
- anguish, languish
- ankle, rankle
- anther, panther
- argent, sergeant
- ascot, mascot
- audit, plaudit
- austral, claustral
- awful, lawful
- badger, cadger
- bailiff, caliph
- bantam, phantom
- bargain, jargon
- Bernard, gurnard
- beverage, leverage
- biplane, triplane
- birchen, urchin
- bodice, goddess
- bonnet, sonnet
- booger, sugar
- briefly, chiefly
- broadcast, podcast
- bullet, pullet
- buskin, Ruskin
- buttock, futtock
- cadre, padre
- cartridge, partridge
- cavern, tavern
- central, ventral
- cheaply, deeply
- cherish, perish
- Christmas, isthmus
- churlish, girlish
- clothing, loathing
- coastal, postal
- cockney, knock-knee
- coffee, toffee
- collet, wallet
- colored, dullard
- coltish, doltish
- combat, wombat
- cornet, hornet
- corpus, porpoise
- corset, Dorset
- cortex, vortex
- Cossacks, Trossachs
- coven, oven
- cowboy, ploughboy
- crackpot, jackpot
- curlew, purlieu
- custom, frustum
- darken, hearken
- darkling, sparkling
- deafest, prefaced
- detail, retail
- dictum, victim
- discal, fiscal
- dockside, oxide
- doesn't, wasn't
- doorway, Norway
- dovetail, love-tale
- emu, seamew
- errand, gerund
- exile, flexile
- extant, sextant
- eyebrow, highbrow
- faithful, scatheful
- farness, harness
- fescue, rescue
- figment, pigment
- finis, Guinness
- Finland, inland
- fitness, witness
- fixture, mixture
- flagship, hagship
- flourish, nourish
- fountain, mountain
- frequence, sequence
- fustic, rustic
- gallant, talent
- ghostess, hostess
- ghostly, mostly
- gibbon, ribbon
- grapnel, shrapnel
- gremlin, Kremlin
- gusset, russet
- harpist, sharpest
- hazard, mazzard
- Hendon, tendon
- highland, island
- hireling, squireling
- hotness, squatness
- image, scrimmage
- inkhorn, stinkhorn
- juncture, puncture
- junket, plunket
- kiddish, Yiddish
- kidney, Sidney
- lappet, tappet
- launder, maunder
- layoff, playoff
- leeward, seaward
- lengthen, strengthen
- lilacs, smilax
- livid, vivid
- lonely, only
- lordship, wardship
- loudly, proudly
- loyal, royal
- magnate, stagnate
- menu, venue
- milder, wilder
- mileage, silage
- minnow, winnow
- modus, nodus
- mopish, Popish
- mournful, scornful
- mufti, tufty
- nescience, prescience
- nonage, Swanage
- nostrum, rostrum
- nuisance, usance
- ogress, progress
- pallor, valor
- parsley, sparsely
- peevish, thievish
- person, worsen
- pinto, Shinto
- rabid, tabid
- rhymeless, timeless
- ripened, stipend
- ripplet, triplet
- ruttish, sluttish
- Scotsman, yachtsman
- Scottish, sottish
- sextile, textile
- siphon, hyphen
- spoonful, tuneful
- tasteful, wasteful
- torpor, warper

=== Trochaic-or-iambic pairs ===
In an trochaic-or-iambic pair, each word can be either a trochee (stressed on the first syllable) or an iamb (stressed on the second syllable).

- contract, entr'acte
- discount, miscount
- hereby, nearby
- sunlit, unlit
- thereby, whereby
- therein, wherein
- thereof, whereof
- therewith, wherewith

=== Iambic pairs ===
In an iambic pair, each word is an iamb and has the first syllable unstressed and the second syllable stressed.

- barrage, garage
- chorale, morale
- eclipsed, ellipsed
- gyrate, irate
- henceforth, thenceforth
- Koran, Oran
- purvey, survey

== Trisyllabic pairs ==
=== Dactylic pairs ===
In a dactylic pair, each word is a dactyl and has the first syllable stressed and the second and third syllables unstressed.

- agitate, sagittate
- analyst, panellist
- article, particle
- bandmaster, grandmaster
- banister, canister
- bingeworthy, cringeworthy
- bonytail, ponytail
- brotherhood, motherhood
- charlatan, tarlatan
- collier, jollier
- copulate, populate
- creepier, sleepier
- cuneiform, uniform
- devious, previous (Although there is a proscribed pronunciation of mischievous ("mischevious") that rhymes with these two words.)
- Everest, cleverest
- fealty, realty
- fortify, mortify
- gradient, radiant
- javelin, ravelin
- jawbreaker, lawbreaker
- jitterbug, litterbug
- Kodiak, zodiac
- lexicon, Mexican
- loyalty, royalty
- manhandle, panhandle
- medium, tedium
- mellophone, telephone
- minister, sinister
- modulate, nodulate
- mutiny, scrutiny
- president, resident
- serpentine, turpentine (in RP, and some British English dialects)

=== Amphibrachic pairs ===
In an amphibrachic pair, each word is an amphibrach and has the second syllable stressed and the first and third syllables unstressed.

- attainder, remainder
- autumnal, columnal
- concoction, decoction (In GA, these rhyme with auction; there is also the YouTube slang word obnoxion, meaning something that is obnoxious.)
- distinguish, extinguish
- pneumatic, rheumatic

=== Anapestic pairs ===
In an anapestic pair, each word is an anapest and has the first and second syllables unstressed and the third syllable stressed.

At this time, no anapestic pairs have been found. The pair "uneclipsed, unellipsed" is disqualified because uneclipsed also rhymes with ellipsed, and because unellipsed also rhymes with eclipsed.

== Tetrasyllabic pairs ==
- beautifully, dutifully
- copulated, populated
- culminated, fulminated
- deifying, reifying
- delegated, relegated
- generated, venerated
- lacerated, macerated
- lecherously, treacherously

== Pentasyllabic pairs ==
- constabulary, vocabulary

== Asymmetric pairs ==
In an asymmetric pair, the words differ in number of syllables. Each pair is in a subsection according to the respective numbers of syllables in the words when they are in alphabetical order.

=== Disyllabic-and-trisyllabic pairs ===
- cerement, endearment
- crucial, fiducial
- digest (noun), obligest

=== Trisyllabic-and-disyllabic pairs ===
- combustion, fustian
- diminished, finished
- eleventh, seventh

=== Trisyllabic-and-tetrasyllabic pairs ===
- bestial, celestial
- bigotry, obligatory
- brilliant, resilient
- cordial, primordial
- fricative, indicative

=== Tetrasyllabic-and-trisyllabic pairs ===
- alluvial, pluvial
- behaviour, saviour
- commodity, oddity (In GA, these rhyme with Alaudidae)
- emergency, urgency
- habitual, ritual
- sarrusophone, sousaphone

=== Pentasyllabic-and-tetrasyllabic pairs ===
- annihilated, violated
- illuminated, ruminated

== See also ==
- List of English words without rhymes
