= Internal rhyme =

Rhyme whose time is not the end of a line

In poetry, internal rhyme, or middle rhyme, is rhyme that occurs within a single line of verse, or between internal phrases across multiple lines. By contrast, rhyme between line endings is known as end rhyme.

Internal rhyme schemes can be denoted with spaces or commas between lines. For example, "ac,ac,ac" denotes a three-line poem with the same internal rhyme on each line, and the same end rhyme on each line (which does not rhyme with the internal rhyme).

== Examples ==
=== Poetry ===
In the following limerick, each stressed syllable rhymes with another stressed syllable using one of three rhyme sets. Each rhyme set is indicated by a different highlight color. Note that the yellow rhyme set provides internal rhyme in lines 1, 2, and 5, and end rhymes in lines 3 and 4, but the blue set is entirely internal, and the pink is exclusively end rhymes.

Each time Rosalie goes for a walk
She well knows that her clothes are the talk
Of the town, and it shows,
But this gown will expose
More than toes, so some shmoes gape and gawk.

Samuel Taylor Coleridge's poem "The Rime of the Ancient Mariner" is filled with lines that include internal rhyme, such as "The guests are met, the feast is set"; "The ship was cheered, the harbour cleared"; and "It cracked and growled, and roared and howled". Internal rhymes were a trademark of 19th century English poet Gerard Manley Hopkins, for instance, in "God's Grandeur":

Why do men then now not reck his rod?
Generations have trod, have trod, have trod;
And all is seared with trade; bleared, smeared with toil;
And wears man's smudge and shares man's smell: the soil
Is bare now, nor can foot feel, being shod.

Percy Dearmer (1867–1936) revised John Bunyan's (1628–1688) poem "To Be a Pilgrim" in 1906. It became a popular hymn when Charles Winfred Douglas (1867–1944) set it to music in 1917. Here are Dearmer's lyrics, with the internal rhymes in bold. Note that in the three quatrains, the internal rhymes are also echoed in the line rhymes (also in bold).

He who would valiant be 'gainst all disaster,
Let him in constancy follow the Master.
There’s no discouragement shall make him once relent
His first avowed intent to be a pilgrim.

Who so beset him round with dismal stories
Do but themselves confound—his strength the more is.
No foes shall stay his might; though he with giants fight,
He will make good his right to be a pilgrim.

Since, Lord, Thou dost defend us with Thy Spirit,
We know we at the end, shall life inherit.
Then fancies flee away! I’ll fear not what men say,
I’ll labor night and day to be a pilgrim.

=== Popular music ===
In the comic operas that he wrote with Arthur Sullivan, W. S. Gilbert (1836–1911) used internal rhymes in some of his song lyrics. For example, Bunthorne's solo aria from Patience begins:

If you're anxious for to shine in the high aesthetic line
As a man of culture rare,
You must get up all the germs of the transcendental terms,
And plant them everywhere.
You must lie upon the daisies and discourse in novel phrases
Of your complicated state of mind,
The meaning doesn't matter if it's only idle chatter
Of a transcendental kind.

Internal rhyme schemes were common in popular songs of the Swing Era. One illustration is the bridge from "Don't Fence Me In", which was written by Cole Porter for the 1944 film Hollywood Canteen:

Just turn me loose let me straddle my old saddle,
Underneath the western skies,
On my cayuse let me wander over yonder,
'Til I see the mountains rise.

Bob Dylan often used internal rhymes in his lyrics such as in "Subterranean Homesick Blues":

Ah get born, keep warm
Short pants, romance, learn to dance
Get dressed, get blessed

And "Like a Rolling Stone":

Once upon a time you dressed so fine
You threw the bums a dime in your prime, didn't you?
People'd call, say, "Beware doll, you're bound to fall"

Other pop, rock, and rhythm and blues lyricists from the 1960s and the 1970s employed the technique more sparingly than Dylan such as Smokey Robinson in "The Tears of a Clown" ("In order to shield my pride, I've tried") and Carly Simon in "Anticipation" ("When I was thinking about how right tonight might be").

=== Rap and hip-hop ===
Internal rhyme is used extensively in rap and hip-hop music, and it sometimes then overlaps with assonance. The usage of internal rhyme in rap has increased over time, but can be found even in the earliest rap songs, such as the Sugarhill Gang's 1979 single, "Rapper's Delight":

I'm six-foot-one and I'm tons of fun and I dress to a T
You see, I got more clothes than Muhammad Ali and I dress so viciously
I got body guards, I got two big cars, I definitely ain't the whack
I got a Lincoln Continental and a sun-roofed Cadillac
So after school, I take a dip in the pool, which is really on the wall
I got a color TV, so I can see the Knicks play basketball

Internal rhyme is used frequently by many different hip-hop artists, including Kool Moe Dee, Big Daddy Kane, Nas, and Rakim, as is demonstrated in Eric B. and Rakim's 1987 piece, "My Melody" from their debut album Paid In Full:

My unusual style will confuse you a while
If I were water, I'd flow in the Nile
So many rhymes you won't have time to go for yours
Just because of applause I have to pause
Right after tonight is when I prepare
To catch another sucker-duck MC out there
My strategy has to be tragedy, catastrophe
And after this you'll call me your majesty...

Another prominent hip-hop artist who uses complex internal rhymes is AZ, as is shown in "The Format":

Young and gifted, my tongue's prolific
In the beach bungalow is how I brung in Christmas
To the streets I'mma flow from the hungriest districts
Swiss kicks crisp when I come to them picnics
Play slow, paper chase stack and lay low
Range rove tinted all black the same old
Psychic mind, righteous rhymes that turned a new leaf from a life of crime
No concerns with new beef, who's as nice as I'm
It's confirmed, from few feet I'm still a sniper blind
Built my fame, spilt my pain
Politicking daily, still trying to milk the game
It's obvious that I'm real, rap skills remain
I took some change and I'm still the same

Black Thought, a rapper from The Roots, uses internal rhymes in the song "Respond/React":

The attractive assassin, blastin the devil trespassin
Master gettin cash in an orderly fashion
Message to the fake n**** flashin
Slow up Ahk, before you get dropped and closed like a caption
Fractional kids don't know the time for action
Styles got the rhythm that of an Anglo-Saxon
Round of applause, an avalanche of clappin
{*BLOW*} that's what happen, now what's your reaction
We heavyweight traction, pro-pornographin
Specialize in science and math and, original black man
Bustin thoughts that pierce your mental
The fierce rippin your sacks and
Vocal toe to toe impeccable splittin your back son
Simple as addition and subtraction
Black Thought, the infinite relaxed one
Shorties say they love it with a passion
Bring the international charm, see a squad I harass

MF Doom uses almost every word as internal rhyme in this verse in his song, "Figaro" (rhymes are highlighted):

It's too hot to handle , you got blue sandals
Who shot you ? Ooh got you new spots to vandal ?
Do not stand still , both show skills
Close but no krills , toast for po' nils , post no bills
Coast to coast Joe Shmoe's flows ill , go chill
Not supposed to overdose, No-Doz pills
Off pride tykes talk wide through scar meat
Off sides like how Worf rides with Star fleet

Kool Keith uses internal rhyme heavily in his song "3000" and effectively throws off the listener:

As studies have shown; participator acts walk up, clog up
And mess up water down the sound that comes from the ghetto
In the middle the core you tour, explore experience
What is real you feel, changing ways
Commercial rap's in the grave, stuff on disc that's very wack
That you saved, you think it's good won't go platinum
Or even turn wood, sell the cassette
Your homey's tape deck gets wet
You my pet, my poodle chicken noodle's on the rise
Open your eyes and see my life
Rap moves on to the year three thousand!

Bad Lip Reading uses internal rhyme in their comedic song “My Stick”.

I disappear for years then reappear right here to cheer about my cool stick…

== See also ==
- Off-centred rhyme
- Leonine verse
