= Broken rhyme =

Broken rhyme, also called split rhyme, is a form of rhyme which can be found in a poem. It is produced by dividing a word at the line break of a poem to make a rhyme with the end word of another line. Gerard Manley Hopkins' poem The Windhover, for example, divides the word "kingdom" at the end of the first line to rhyme with the word "wing" ending the fourth line. Hopkins is rare in using the device in serious poems. More commonly, the device is used in comic or playful poetry, as in the sixth stanza of Edward Lear's "How Pleasant to Know Mr. Lear" or in Elizabeth Bishop's "Pink Dog":

Sixth Stanza of "How Pleasant to Know Mr. Lear":

When he walks in waterproof white,
The children run after him so!
Calling out, "He's gone out in his night-
Gown, that crazy old Englishman, oh!"

Here, the word "nightgown" has been split over the third and fourth lines so that the first and third lines form a tail rhyme.

Singer-songwriter and satirist Tom Lehrer occasionally used broken rhymes for comedic effect, such as in the opening lines of "We Will All Go Together When We Go":

When you attend a funeral
It is sad to think that sooner or
Later those you love will do the same for you
And you may have thought it tragic
Not to mention other adjec-
-tives to think of all the weeping they will do

Here, the word "adjective" has been split over the fifth and sixth line to rhyme with "tragic".

Note that the expression "sooner or later" has also been split down the middle, but with no word-division, between the second and third line. This is a closely related poetry device called enjambment.
