= Enjambment =

Incomplete syntax at the end of a line in poetry

In poetry, enjambment (/ɪnˈdʒæmmənt, ɛn-, -ˈdʒæmb-/; from the French enjamber) is incomplete syntax at the end of a line; the meaning 'runs over' or 'steps over' from one poetic line to the next, without punctuation. Lines without enjambment are end-stopped. The origin of the word is credited to the French word enjamber, which means 'to straddle or encroach'.

In reading, the delay of meaning creates a tension that is released when the word or phrase that completes the syntax is encountered (called the rejet); the tension arises from the "mixed message" produced both by the pause of the line-end, and the suggestion to continue provided by the incomplete meaning. In spite of the apparent contradiction between rhyme, which heightens closure, and enjambment, which delays it, the technique is compatible with rhymed verse. Even in couplets, the closed or heroic couplet was a late development; older is the open couplet, where rhyme and enjambed lines co-exist.

Enjambment has a long history in poetry. Homer used the technique, and it is the norm for alliterative verse where rhyme is unknown. In the 32nd Psalm of the Hebrew Bible enjambment is unusually conspicuous. It was used extensively in England by Elizabethan poets for dramatic and narrative verses, before giving way to closed couplets. The example of John Milton in Paradise Lost laid the foundation for its subsequent use by the English Romantic poets; in its preface he identified it as one of the chief features of his verse: "sense variously drawn out from one verse into another".

== Examples ==
The start of The Waste Land by T. S. Eliot, with only lines 4 and 7 end-stopped:

April is the cruellest month, breeding
Lilacs out of the dead land, mixing
Memory and desire, stirring
Dull roots with spring rain.
Winter kept us warm, covering
Earth in forgetful snow, feeding
A little life with dried tubers.

These lines from Shakespeare's The Winter's Tale (c. 1611) are heavily enjambed:

I am not prone to weeping, as our sex
Commonly are; the want of which vain dew
Perchance shall dry your pities; but I have
That honourable grief lodged here which burns
Worse than tears drown.

Meaning flows as the lines progress, and the reader's eye is forced to go on to the next sentence. It can also make the reader feel uncomfortable or the poem feel like "flow-of-thought" with a sensation of urgency or disorder. In contrast, the following lines from Romeo and Juliet (c. 1595) are completely end-stopped:

A glooming peace this morning with it brings.
The sun for sorrow will not show his head.
Go hence, to have more talk of these sad things.
Some shall be pardon'd, and some punishèd.

Each line is formally correspondent with a unit of thought—in this case, a clause of a sentence. End-stopping is more frequent in early Shakespeare: as his style developed, the proportion of enjambment in his plays increased. Scholars such as Goswin König and A. C. Bradley have estimated approximate dates of undated works of Shakespeare by studying the frequency of enjambment.

Endymion by John Keats, lines 2–4:

Its loveliness increases; it will never
Pass into nothingness; but still will keep
A bower quiet for us...

The song "One Night In Bangkok", from the musical Chess, written by Tim Rice and Björn Ulvaeus, includes examples such as :

The creme de la creme of the chess world in a
Show with everything but Yul Brynner
This grips me more than would a
Muddy old river or reclining Buddha

Closely related to enjambment is the technique of "broken rhyme" or "split rhyme" which involves the splitting of an individual word, typically to allow a rhyme with one or more syllables of the split word. In English verse, broken rhyme is used almost exclusively in light verse, such as to form a word that rhymes with "orange", as in this example by Willard Espy, in his poem "The Unrhymable Word: Orange":

The four eng-
ineers
Wore orange
brassieres.

The clapping game "Miss Susie" uses the break "... Hell / -o operator" to allude to the taboo word "Hell", then replaces it with the innocuous "Hello". Similarly, the Spanish-language song "La Camisa Negra" leads the listener to imagine an obscenity before the next verse completes the word more innocently.

== See also ==
- Blank verse
- Caesura
- Concrete poetry
- Free verse
- Line break (poetry)
