= Verse (poetry) =

Single metrical line in a poetic composition

A verse is formally a single metrical line in a poetic composition. However, verse has come to represent any grouping of lines in a poetic composition, with groupings traditionally having been referred to as stanzas.

Verse in the uncountable (mass noun) sense refers to poetry in contrast to prose. Where the common unit of verse is based on meter or rhyme, the common unit of prose is purely grammatical, such as a sentence or paragraph.

Verse in the second sense is also used pejoratively in contrast to poetry to suggest work that is too pedestrian or too incompetent to be classed as poetry.

== Types of verse ==
=== Rhymed verse ===
Rhymed verse is historically the most commonly used form of verse in English. It generally has a discernible meter and an end rhyme.

I felt a Cleaving in my Mind –
As if my Brain had split –
I tried to match it – Seam by Seam –
But could not make them fit.

The thought behind, I strove to join
Unto the thought before –
But Sequence ravelled out of Sound
Like Balls – upon a Floor.
—Emily Dickinson

=== Blank verse ===
Blank verse is poetry written in regular, metrical, but unrhymed, lines, almost always composed of iambic pentameters.

Of man's first disobedience, and the fruit
Of that forbidden tree, whose mortal taste
Brought death into the world, and all our woe,
With loss of Eden, till one greater man
....
—John Milton (from Paradise Lost)

=== Free verse ===
Free verse is usually defined as having no fixed meter and no end rhyme. Although free verse may include end rhyme, it commonly does not.

Whirl up, sea—
Whirl your pointed pines
Splash your great pines
On our rocks,
Hurl your green over us,
Cover us with your pools of fir.
—H.D.

== See also ==
- Strophe
