= Rhyme =

Repetition of similar vowel sounds in language

A rhyme is a repetition of similar sounds (usually the same phonemes) in the final stressed syllables and any following syllables of two or more words. Most often, this kind of rhyming (perfect rhyming) is consciously used for a musical or aesthetic effect in the final position of lines within poems or songs. More broadly, a rhyme may also variously refer to other types of similar sounds near the ends of two or more words. Furthermore, the word rhyme has come to be sometimes used as a shorthand term for any brief poem, such as a nursery rhyme or Balliol rhyme.

== Etymology ==
The word derives from Old French: rime or ryme, which may be derived from Old Frankish: rīm, a Germanic term meaning "series", or "sequence" attested in Old English (Old English: rīm meaning "enumeration", series", or "numeral") and Old High German: rīm, ultimately cognate to Old Irish: rím, Ancient Greek: ἀριθμός (arithmos "number"). Alternatively, the Old French words may derive from Latin: rhythmus, from Ancient Greek: ῥυθμός (rhythmos, rhythm).

The spelling rhyme (from the original rime) was introduced at the beginning of the Modern English period from a scholarly but likely etymologically incorrect association with Latin rhythmus. The older spelling rime survives in Modern English as a rare alternative spelling; cf. The Rime of the Ancient Mariner. A distinction between the spellings is also sometimes made in the study of linguistics and phonology for which rime or rhyme is used to refer to the nucleus and coda of a syllable. Some prefer to spell it rime to distinguish it from the poetic rhyme covered by this article (see syllable rime).

== Function of rhyming words ==
Rhyme partly seems to be enjoyed simply as a repeating pattern that is pleasant to hear. Rhyme is a form of art that one can use to communicate to the reader or audience. It can also be a mnemonic device that facilitates short-term memory. The regular use of tail rhyme helps to mark off the ends of lines, thus clarifying the metrical structure for the listener. As with other poetic techniques, poets use it to suit their own purposes; for example, William Shakespeare often used a rhyming couplet to mark off the end of a scene in a play.

== Types of rhyme ==
The word rhyme can be used in a specific and a general sense. In the specific sense, two words rhyme if their final stressed vowel and all following sounds are identical; two lines of poetry rhyme if their final strong positions are filled with rhyming words. Examples are sight and flight, deign and gain, madness and sadness, love and dove.

=== Perfect rhymes ===
Perfect rhymes can be classified by the location of the final stressed syllable.

- single, also known as masculine: a rhyme in which the stress is on the final syllable of the words (rhyme, sublime)
- double, also known as feminine: a rhyme in which the stress is on the penultimate (second from last) syllable of the words (picky, tricky)
- dactylic: a rhyme in which the stress is on the antepenultimate (third from last) syllable (amorous, glamorous)

Feminine and dactylic rhymes may also be realized as compound (or mosaic) rhymes (poet, know it).

=== General rhymes ===
In the general sense, general rhyme can refer to various kinds of phonetic similarity between words, and the use of such similar-sounding words in organizing verse. Rhymes in this general sense are classified according to the degree and manner of the phonetic similarity:

- syllabic: a rhyme in which the last syllable of each word sounds the same but does not necessarily contain stressed vowels. (cleaver, silver, or pitter, patter; the final syllable of the words bottle and fiddle is /l/, a liquid consonant.)
- imperfect (or near): a rhyme between a stressed and an unstressed syllable. (wing, caring)
- weak (or unaccented): a rhyme between two sets of one or more unstressed syllables. (hammer, carpenter)
- semirhyme: a rhyme with an extra syllable on one word. (bend, ending)
- forced (or oblique): a rhyme with an imperfect match in sound. (green, fiend; one, thumb)
- assonance: matching vowels. (shake, hate) Assonance is sometimes referred to as slant rhymes, along with consonance.
- consonance: matching consonants. (rabies, robbers)
- half rhyme (or slant rhyme): matching final consonants. (hand , lend)
- pararhyme: all consonants match. (tick, tock)
- alliteration (or head rhyme): matching initial consonants. (ship, short)

=== Identical rhymes ===
Identical rhymes are considered less than perfect in English poetry; but are valued more highly in other literatures such as, for example, rime riche in French poetry.

Though homophones and homonyms satisfy the first condition for rhyming—that is, that the stressed vowel sound is the same—they do not satisfy the second: that the preceding consonant be different. In a perfect rhyme, the last stressed vowel and all following sounds are identical in both words.

If the sound preceding the stressed vowel is also identical, the rhyme is sometimes considered to be inferior and not a perfect rhyme after all. An example of such a super-rhyme or "more than perfect rhyme" is the identical rhyme, in which not only the vowels but also the onsets of the rhyming syllables are identical, as in gun and begun. Punning rhymes, such as bare and bear are also identical rhymes. The rhyme may extend even farther back than the last stressed vowel. If it extends all the way to the beginning of the line, so that there are two lines that sound very similar or identical, it is called a holorhyme ("For I scream/For ice cream").

In poetics these would be considered identity, rather than rhyme.

=== Eye rhyme ===
Eye rhymes or sight rhymes or spelling rhymes refer to similarity in spelling but not in sound where the final sounds are spelled identically but pronounced differently. Examples in English are cough, bough, and love, move.

Some early written poetry appears to contain these, but in many cases the words used rhymed at the time of writing, and subsequent changes in pronunciation have meant that the rhyme is now lost.

=== Mind rhyme ===
Mind rhyme is a kind of substitution rhyme similar to rhyming slang, but it is less generally codified and is "heard" only when generated by a specific verse context. For instance, "this sugar is neat / and tastes so sour." If a reader or listener anticipates the word "sweet" instead of "sour", a mind rhyme has occurred.

=== Classification by position ===
Rhymes may be classified according to their position in the verse:

- Tail rhyme (also called end rhyme or rime couée) is a rhyme in the final syllable(s) of a verse (the most common kind).
- Internal rhyme occurs when a word or phrase in the interior of a line rhymes with a word or phrase at the end of a line, or within a different line.
- Off-centered rhyme is a type of internal rhyme occurring in unexpected places in a given line. This is sometimes called a misplaced-rhyme scheme or a spoken word rhyme style.
- Holorime, mentioned above, occurs when two entire lines have the same sound.
- Echo rhyme occurs when the same syllable endings are utilized (example: disease/ease).
- Broken rhyme is a type of enjambement producing a rhyme by dividing a word at the line break of a poem to make a rhyme with the end word of another line.
- Cross rhyme matches a sound or sounds at the end of a line with the same sound or sounds in the middle of the following (or preceding) line.

A rhyme scheme is the pattern of rhyming lines in a poem.

== History ==
In many languages, including modern European languages and Arabic, poets use rhyme in set patterns as a structural element for specific poetic forms, such as ballads, sonnets and rhyming couplets. Some rhyming schemes have become associated with a specific language, culture or period, while other rhyming schemes have achieved use across languages, cultures or time periods. However, the use of structural rhyme is not universal even within the European tradition. Much modern poetry avoids traditional rhyme schemes.

The earliest surviving evidence of rhyming is the Chinese Shi Jing (ca. 10th century BCE). Rhyme is also occasionally used in the Bible. In classical Greek and Latin poetry, rhyme was only an occasional feature. For instance, Catullus includes partial rhymes in the poem Cui dono lepidum novum libellum. The ancient Greeks knew rhyme, and rhymes in The Wasps by Aristophanes are noted by a translator.

Rhyme became a permanent - even obligatory - feature of poetry in Hebrew language, around the 4th century CE. It is found in the Jewish liturgical poetry written in the Byzantine Empire era. This was realized by scholars only recently, thanks to the thousands of piyyuts that have been discovered in the Cairo Geniza. It is assumed that the principle of rhyme was transferred from Hebrew liturgical poetry to the poetry of the Syriac Christianity (written in Aramaic), and through this mediation introduced into Latin poetry and then into all other languages of Europe.

Rhyme is central to classical Arabic poetry tracing back to its pre-Islamic roots. According to some archaic sources, Irish literature introduced the rhyme to Early Medieval Europe, but that is a disputed claim. In the 7th century, the Irish had brought the art of rhyming verses to a high pitch of perfection. The leonine verse is notable for introducing rhyme into High Medieval literature in the 12th century.

Rhyme entered European poetry in the High Middle Ages under the influence of the Arabic language in Al Andalus (modern Spain). Arabic language poets used rhyme extensively from the first development of literary Arabic in the sixth century, as in their long, rhyming qasidas.

Since dialects vary and languages change over time, lines that rhyme in a given register or era may not rhyme in another, and it may not be clear how one should pronounce the words so that they rhyme. An example is this couplet from Handel's Judas Maccabaeus:

Rejoice, O Judah, and in songs divine
With cherubim and seraphim harmonious join.

== Rhyme in various languages ==
=== Arabic ===
Rhymes were widely spread in the Arabic language in pre-Islamic times, in letters, poems and songs, as well as long, rhyming qasidas. In addition, the Quran uses a form of rhymed prose named saj'.

=== Celtic languages ===
Rhyming in the Celtic languages takes a drastically different course from most other Western rhyming schemes despite strong contact with the Romance and English patterns. Even today, despite extensive interaction with English and French culture, Celtic rhyme continues to demonstrate native characteristics. Brian Ó Cuív sets out the rules of rhyme in Irish poetry of the classical period: the last stressed vowel and any subsequent long vowels must be identical in order for two words to rhyme. Consonants are grouped into six classes for the purpose of rhyme: they need not be identical, but must belong to the same class. Thus 'b' and 'd' can rhyme (both being 'voiced plosives'), as can 'bh' and 'l' (which are both 'voiced continuants') but 'l', a 'voiced continuant', cannot rhyme with 'ph', a 'voiceless continuant'. Furthermore, "for perfect rhyme a palatalized consonant may be balanced only by a palatalized consonant and a velarized consonant by a velarized one." In the post-Classical period, these rules fell out of use, and in popular verse simple assonance often suffices, as can be seen in an example of Irish Gaelic rhyme from the traditional song Bríd Óg Ní Mháille:

Is a Bhríd Óg Ní Mháille
[ɪsˠ ə ˈvɾʲiːdʲ oːɡ n̠ʲiː ˈwaːl̠ʲə]
'S tú d'fhág mo chroí cráite
[sˠ t̪ˠuː ˈd̪ˠaːɡ mə xɾʲiː ˈkɾˠaːtʲə]

Translation:

Oh young Bridget O'Malley

You have left my heart breaking

Here the vowels are the same, but the consonants, although both palatalized, do not fall into the same class in the bardic rhyming scheme.

=== Chinese ===
Besides the vowel/consonant aspect of rhyming, Chinese rhymes often include tone quality (that is, tonal contour) as an integral linguistic factor in determining rhyme.

Use of rhyme in Classical Chinese poetry typically but not always appears in the form of paired couplets, with end-rhyming in the final syllable of each couplet.

Another important aspect of rhyme in regard to Chinese language studies is the study or reconstruction of past varieties of Chinese, such as Middle Chinese.

=== English ===
Old English poetry is mostly alliterative verse. One of the earliest rhyming poems in English is The Rhyming Poem.

As stress is important in English, lexical stress is one of the factors that affects the similarity of sounds for the perception of rhyme. Perfect rhyme can be defined as the case when two words rhyme if their final stressed vowel and all following sounds are identical.

Some words in English, such as "orange" and "silver", are commonly regarded as having no rhyme. Although a clever writer can get around this (for example, by obliquely rhyming "orange" with combinations of words like "door hinge" or "more range", or with lesser-known words like "Blorenge" [a hill in Wales], or the surname Gorringe). Because it is generally easier to move the word out of rhyming position or replace it with a synonym ("orange" could become "amber", while "silver" could become a combination of "bright and argent"). A skilled orator might be able to tweak the pronunciation of certain words to facilitate a stronger rhyme (for example, pronouncing "orange" as "oringe" to rhyme with "door hinge").

One view of rhyme in English is from John Milton's preface to Paradise Lost:

The Measure is English Heroic Verse without Rime, as that of Homer in Greek, and of Virgil in Latin; Rime being no necessary Adjunct or true Ornament of Poem or good Verse, in longer Works especially, but the Invention of a barbarous Age, to set off wretched matter and lame Meeter; grac't indeed since by the use of some famous modern Poets, carried away by Custom ...

A more tempered view is taken by W. H. Auden in The Dyer's Hand:

Rhymes, meters, stanza forms, etc., are like servants. If the master is fair enough to win their affection and firm enough to command their respect, the result is an orderly happy household. If he is too tyrannical, they give notice; if he lacks authority, they become slovenly, impertinent, drunk and dishonest.

Forced or clumsy rhyme is often a key ingredient of doggerel.

=== French ===
In French poetry, unlike in English, it is common to have identical rhymes, in which not only the vowels of the final syllables of the lines rhyme, but their onset consonants ("consonnes d'appui") as well. To the ear of someone accustomed to English verse, this often sounds like a very weak rhyme. For example, an English perfect rhyme of homophones, flour and flower, would seem weak, whereas a French rhyme of homophones doigt ("finger") and doit ("must") or point ("point") and point ("not") is not only acceptable but quite common.

Rhymes are sometimes classified into the categories of "rime pauvre" ("poor rhyme"), "rime suffisante" ("sufficient rhyme"), "rime riche" ("rich rhyme") and "rime richissime" ("very rich rhyme"), according to the number of rhyming sounds in the two words or in the parts of the two verses. For example, to rhyme "tu" with "vu" would be a poor rhyme (the words have only the vowel in common), to rhyme "pas" with "bras" a sufficient rhyme (with the vowel and the silent consonant in common), and "tante" with "attente" a rich rhyme (with the vowel, the onset consonant, and the coda consonant with its mute "e" in common). Authorities disagree, however, on exactly where to place the boundaries between the categories.

Classical French rhyme not only differs from English rhyme in its different treatment of onset consonants. It also treats coda consonants in a distinctive way.

French spelling includes several final letters that are no longer pronounced and that in many cases have never been pronounced. Such final unpronounced letters continue to affect rhyme according to the rules of Classical French versification.

The most important "silent" letter is the "mute e". In spoken French today, final "e" is, in some regional accents (in Paris for example), omitted after consonants; but in Classical French prosody, it was considered an integral part of the rhyme even when following the vowel. "Joue" could rhyme with "boue", but not with "trou". Rhyming words ending with this silent "e" were said to make up a "double rhyme", while words not ending with this silent "e" made up a "single rhyme". It was a principle of stanza-formation that single and double rhymes had to alternate in the stanza. Virtually all 17th-century French plays in verse alternate masculine and feminine Alexandrin couplets.

The now-silent final consonants present a more complex case. They, too, were traditionally an integral part of the rhyme, such that "pont" rhymed with "vont" but not with "long". (The voicing of consonants was lost in liaison and thus ignored, so "pont" also rhymed with "rond".) There are a few rules that govern most word-final consonants in archaic French pronunciation:

- The distinction between voiced and unvoiced consonants is lost in the final position. Therefore, "d" and "t" (both pronounced /t/) rhyme. So too with "c", "g" and "q" (all /k/), and "s", "x" and "z" (all /z/). Rhymes ending in /z/ are called "plural rhymes" because most plural nouns and adjectives end in "s" or "x".
- Nasal vowels rhyme whether spelled with "m" or "n" (e.g., "essaim" rhymes with "sain").
- If a word ends in a stop consonant followed by "s", the stop is silent and ignored for purposes of rhyming (e.g., "temps" rhymes with "dents"). In the archaic orthography some of these silent stops are omitted from the spelling as well (e.g., "dens" for "dents").

==== Holorime ====
Holorime is an extreme example of rime richissime spanning an entire verse. Alphonse Allais was a notable exponent of holorime. Here is an example of a holorime couplet from Marc Monnier:

Gall, amant de la Reine, alla (tour magnanime)
Galamment de l'Arène à la Tour Magne, à Nîmes.

Translation:

Gallus, the Queen's lover, went (a magnanimous gesture)
Gallantly from the Arena to the Great Tower, at Nîmes.

=== German ===
Because German phonology features a wide array of vowel sounds, certain imperfect rhymes are widely admitted in German poetry. These include rhyming "e" with "ä" and "ö", rhyming "i" with "ü", rhyming "ei" with "eu" (spelled "äu" in some words) and rhyming a long vowel with its short counterpart.

Some examples of imperfect rhymes (all from Friedrich Schiller's "An die Freude"):

- Deine Zauber binden wieder / Alle Menschen werden Brüder
- Freude trinken alle Wesen / Alle Guten, alle Bösen

=== Greek ===
See Homoioteleuton

Ancient Greek poetry was strictly metrical, based on matching the rhythms of syllables with long and short vowels between lines. Rhyme is used, if at all, only as an occasional rhetorical flourish.

The first Greek to write rhyming poetry was the fourteenth-century Cretan Stephanos Sachlikis. However in modern Greek poetry, rhyme is a common fixture.

=== Hebrew ===
Ancient Hebrew rarely employed rhyme, e.g., in Exodus 29 35: ועשית לאהרן ולבניו כָּכה, ככל אשר צויתי אֹתָכה (the identical part in both rhyming words being / 'axa/ ). Rhyme became a permanent - even obligatory - feature of poetry in Hebrew language, around the 4th century CE. It is found in the Jewish liturgical poetry written in the Byzantine empire era. This was realized by scholars only recently, thanks to the thousands of piyyuts that have been discovered in the Cairo Geniza. It is assumed that the principle of rhyme was transferred from Hebrew liturgical poetry to the poetry of the Syriac Christianity (written in Aramaic), and through this mediation introduced into Latin poetry and then into all other languages of Europe.

=== Latin ===
In Latin rhetoric and poetry homeoteleuton and alliteration were frequently used devices.

Tail rhyme was occasionally used, as in this piece of poetry by Cicero:

O Fortunatam natam me consule Romam.

Translation:

O fortunate Rome, to be born with me consul

But tail rhyme was not used as a prominent structural feature of Latin poetry until it was introduced under the influence of local vernacular traditions in the early Middle Ages. This is the Latin hymn Dies Irae:

Dies irae, dies illa
Solvet saeclum in favilla
Teste David cum Sybilla

Translation:

The day of wrath, that day
which will reduce the world to ashes,
as foretold by David and the Sybil.

Medieval poetry may mix Latin and vernacular languages. Mixing languages in verse or rhyming words in different languages is termed macaronic.

=== Polish ===
In Polish literature rhyme was used from the beginning. Unrhymed verse was never popular, although it was sometimes imitated from Latin. Homer's, Virgil's and even Milton's epic poems were furnished with rhymes by Polish translators. Because of paroxytonic accentuation in Polish, feminine rhymes always prevailed. Rules of Polish rhyme were established in 16th century. Then only feminine rhymes were allowed in syllabic verse system. Together with introducing syllabo-accentual metres, masculine rhymes began to occur in Polish poetry. They were most popular at the end of 19th century. The most frequent rhyme scheme in Old Polish (16th - 18th centuries) was couplet AABBCCDD..., but Polish poets, having perfect knowledge of Italian language and literature, experimented with other schemes, among others ottava rima (ABABABCC) and sonnet (ABBA ABBA CDC DCD or ABBA ABBA CDCD EE).

Wpłynąłem na suchego przestwór oceanu,
Wóz nurza się w zieloność i jak łódka brodzi,
Śród fali łąk szumiących, śród kwiatów powodzi,
Omijam koralowe ostrowy burzanu.

— Adam Mickiewicz,
"Stepy akermańskie", Sonety krymskie, lines 1–4
Translation:

Across sea-meadows measureless I go,
My wagon sinking under grass so tall
The flowery petals in foam on me fall,
And blossom-isles float by I do not know.

— "The Ackerman Steppe", Sonnets from the Crimea,
translated by Edna Worthley Underwood

The metre of Mickiewicz's sonnet is the Polish alexandrine (tridecasyllable, in Polish "trzynastozgłoskowiec"): 13(7+6) and its rhymes are feminine: [anu] and [odzi].

=== Portuguese ===
Portuguese classifies rhymes in the following manner:

- rima pobre (poor rhyme): rhyme between words of the same grammatical category (e.g., noun with noun) or between very common endings (-ão, -ar);
- rima rica (rich rhyme): rhyme between words of different grammatical classes or with uncommon endings;
- rima preciosa (precious rhyme): rhyme between words with a different morphology, for example estrela (star) with vê-la (to see her);
- rima esdrúxula (odd rhyme): rhyme between proparoxytonic words (example: ânimo, "animus", and unânimo, "unanimous").

=== Russian ===
Rhyme was introduced into Russian poetry in the 18th century. Folk poetry had generally been unrhymed, relying more on dactylic line endings for effect. Two words ending in an accented vowel are only considered to rhyme if they share a preceding consonant. Vowel pairs rhyme—even though non-Russian speakers may not perceive them as the same sound. Consonant pairs rhyme if both are devoiced. As in French, formal poetry traditionally alternates between masculine and feminine rhymes.

Early 18th-century poetry demanded perfect rhymes that were also grammatical rhymes—namely that noun endings rhymed with noun endings, verb endings with verb endings, and so on. Such rhymes relying on morphological endings become much rarer in modern Russian poetry, and greater use is made of approximate rhymes.

The rules for rhyming used by Alexander Pushkin and subsequent Russian poets owe much to French verse. The basic rules, as laid out by Vladimir Nabokov in his Notes on Prosody, are as follows:

- As in French, rhymes are divided into masculine and feminine according to whether the word is stressed on the last or second-to-last syllable. Two different masculine rhymes or two feminine rhymes cannot normally occur in succeeding lines. Rhyme schemes involving words stressed on the third-to-last syllable or earlier in the word are found in some poems but are relatively rare, especially in longer poetry.
- As in French, two words with the same pronunciation but different meanings can be rhymed, e.g., супру́га ("wife") and супру́га ("husband's").
- Words ending in a stressed vowel (e.g., вода́) can only rhyme with other words which share the consonant preceding the vowel (e.g., когда́).
  - Words ending in a stressed vowel preceded by another vowel, as well as words ending in a stressed vowel preceded by /j/, can all be rhymed with each other: моя́, тая́ and чья all rhyme.
  - According to Nabokov, a special dispensation is made for любви́, an inflected form of любо́вь ("love"), allowing it to be rhymed with all words ending in a vowel followed by /ˈi/ (e.g., твои́). Some poets, including Pushkin, go further and rhyme любви́ with any word ending in /ˈi/.
- Unstressed а and о (e.g., жа́ло and Ура́ла) can be rhymed with each other. For most contemporary Russian speakers these letters when unstressed are pronounced identically as /ə/. See also vowel reduction in Russian and akanye.
- In unstressed syllables, /ɨ/, /ɨj/ and /əj/ are considered more or less equivalent: thus за́лы, ма́лый and а́лой can all be rhymed. Nabokov describes rhyming /ɨ/ with /ɨj/ as "not inelegant" and rhyming /ɨj/ with /əj/ as "absolutely correct".

=== Sanskrit ===
Patterns of rich rhyme (prāsa) play a role in modern Sanskrit poetry, but only to a minor extent in historical Sanskrit texts. They are classified according to their position within the pada (metrical foot): ādiprāsa (first syllable), dvitīyākṣara prāsa (second syllable), antyaprāsa (final syllable) etc.

=== Spanish ===
Spanish mainly differentiates two types of rhymes:

- rima consonante (consonant rhyme): Those words of the same stress with identical endings, matching consonants and vowels, for example robo (robbery) and lobo (wolf), legua (league) and yegua (mare) or canción (song) and montón (pile).
- rima asonante (assonant rhyme): those words of the same stress that only the vowels identical at the end, for example zapato (shoe) and brazo (arm), ave (bird) and ame (would love), reloj (watch) and feroz (fierce), puerta (door) and ruleta (roulette).

Spanish rhyme is also classified by stress type since different types cannot rhyme with each other:

- rima llana (plane rhyme): the rhyming words are unaccented, for example cama (bed) and rama (branch), pereza (laziness) and moneda (coin) or espejo (mirror) and pienso (I think).
- rima aguda (oxytonic rhyme): The rhyming words are accented on the last syllable, for example: cartón (cardboard) and limón (lemon), jerez (sherry) and revés (backwards). Grave words that end in a single same vowel can be asonante rhymes for example compró (he/she bought) and llevó (he/she carried), tendré (I will have) and pediré (I will ask), perdí (I lost) and medí (I measured).
- rima esdrújula (odd rhyme): The rhyming words are accented on the antepenult. For example, mácula (stain) and báscula (scale), estrépito (noise) and intrépido (fearless), rápido (fast) and pálido (pallid).

=== Tamil ===
There are some unique rhyming schemes in Dravidian languages like Tamil. Specifically, the rhyme called etukai (anaphora) occurs on the second consonant of each line.

The other rhyme and related patterns are called mōnai (alliteration), toṭai (epiphora) and iraṭṭai kiḷavi (parallelism).

Some classical Tamil poetry forms, such as veṇpā, have rigid grammars for rhyme to the point that they could be expressed as a context-free grammar.

=== Urdu ===
Rhymes are called Qafiya in Urdu. Qafiya has a very important place in Urdu Poetry. No couplet of Urdu Ghazal is complete without a Qafiya. Following is an example of an Urdu couplet from Faiz Ahmed Faiz's ghazal

dono jahaan teri mohabbat mein haar ke,
wo jaa rahaa hai koi shab e ghum guzaar ke

haar and guzaar are qafiyas in this couplet because of rhyming.

=== Vietnamese ===
Rhymes are used in Vietnamese to produce similes. The following is an example of a Rhyming Simile:

Nghèo như con mèo
/ŋɛu ɲɯ kɔn mɛu/
"Poor as a cat"

Compare the above Vietnamese example, which is a rhyming simile, to the English phrase "(as) poor as a church mouse", which is only a semantic simile.

== See also ==
- Alliteration
- Assonance
- Glossary of poetry terms
- List of English words without rhymes
- Consonance
- Pantun
- Multisyllabic rhymes
- Rhyme in rap
- Rhyming recipe
- Rhyming slang (e.g. Cockney rhyming slang)
- Rhyming spiritual
- Rime table - syllable chart of the Chinese language
- Traditional rhyme
