= Pyatiletka (disambiguation) =

Pyatiletka refers to the five-year plans for the national economy of the Soviet Union.

Pyatiletka may also refer to:

- Pyatiletka, Austrumsky Selsoviet, Iglinsky District, Republic of Bashkortostan
- Pyatiletka, Nadezhdinsky Selsoviet, Iglinsky District, Republic of Bashkortostan
- 2122 Pyatiletka, a stony asteroid

== See also ==
- Vtoraya Pyatiletka (disambiguation)
