= Sakharny =

Sakharny (Russian: Са́харный; masculine), Sakharnaya (Са́харная; feminine), or Sakharnoye (Са́харное; neuter) is the name of several rural localities in Russia:

- Sakharny, Republic of Khakassia, a settlement in Sapogovsky Selsoviet of Ust-Abakansky District in the Republic of Khakassia
- Sakharny, Volgograd Oblast, a khutor under the administrative jurisdiction of the Town of District Significance of Krasnoslobodsk in Sredneakhtubinsky District of Volgograd Oblast
- Sakharnoye, a village in Zachulymsky Selsoviet of Birilyussky District in Krasnoyarsk Krai
