= Repino =

Repino (Russian: Репино) is the name of several inhabited localities in Russia.

== Modern localities ==
Urban localities

- Repino, Saint Petersburg, a municipal settlement in Kurortny District of the federal city of St. Petersburg

Rural localities

- Repino, Chelyabinsk Oblast, a settlement in Kosobrodsky Selsoviet of Troitsky District in Chelyabinsk Oblast
- Repino, Republic of Crimea, a selo in Bakhchisaraysky District of the Republic of Crimea
- Repino, Ivanovo Oblast, a village in Shuysky District of Ivanovo Oblast
- Repino, Mari El Republic, a village in Pektubayevsky Rural Okrug of Novotoryalsky District in the Mari El Republic; 57°1′N 48°31′E
- Repino, Nizhny Novgorod Oblast, a village in Kovriginsky Selsoviet of Gorodetsky District in Nizhny Novgorod Oblast; 56°44′N 43°32′E
- Repino, Novgorod Oblast, a village in Belebelkovskoye Settlement of Poddorsky District in Novgorod Oblast
- Repino, Gaysky District, Orenburg Oblast, a settlement in Repinsky Selsoviet of Gaysky District in Orenburg Oblast
- Repino, Orenburgsky District, Orenburg Oblast, a selo in Strukovsky Selsoviet of Orenburgsky District in Orenburg Oblast
- Repino, Pechorsky District, Pskov Oblast, a village in Pechorsky District of Pskov Oblast
- Repino, Pushkinogorsky District, Pskov Oblast, a village in Pushkinogorsky District of Pskov Oblast
- Repino, Smolensk Oblast, a village in Repinskoye Rural Settlement of Yartsevsky District in Smolensk Oblast
- Repino, Tver Oblast, a village in Stepurinskoye Rural Settlement of Staritsky District in Tver Oblast
- Repino, Vladimir Oblast, a selo in Melenkovsky District of Vladimir Oblast
- Repino, Volgograd Oblast, a khutor in Kletsky Selsoviet of Sredneakhtubinsky District in Volgograd Oblast
- Repino, Vologda Oblast, a village in Yudinsky Selsoviet of Velikoustyugsky District in Vologda Oblast
- Repino, Nekrasovsky District, Yaroslavl Oblast, a village in Rodyukinsky Rural Okrug of Nekrasovsky District in Yaroslavl Oblast
- Repino, Poshekhonsky District, Yaroslavl Oblast, a village in Kolodinsky Rural Okrug of Poshekhonsky District in Yaroslavl Oblast

== Alternative names ==
- Repino, alternative name of Repinka, a selo in Repinsky Rural Okrug of Kalachinsky District in Omsk Oblast; 54°36′N 74°45′E
