= Tretya Karta =

Tretya Karta Третья Карта
- Settlement
- Location within Volgograd Oblast Location within Russia
- Coordinates: 48°45′N 44°42′E
- Country: Russia
- Region: Volgograd Oblast
- District: Sredneakhtubinsky District
- Time zone: UTC+4:00

Tretya Karta (Russian: Третья Карта) is a rural locality (a settlement) in Kirovskoye Rural Settlement, Sredneakhtubinsky District, Volgograd Oblast, Russia. The population was 483 as of 2010. There are 16 streets.

== Geography ==
Tretya Karta is located near the Pakhotny Erik, 19 km northwest of Srednyaya Akhtuba (the district's administrative centre) by road. Kuybyshev is the nearest rural locality.
