= Prikanalny, Sredneakhtubinsky District, Volgograd Oblast =

Prikanalny Приканальный
- Settlement
- Location within Volgograd Oblast Location within Russia
- Coordinates: 48°45′N 44°40′E
- Country: Russia
- Region: Volgograd Oblast
- District: Sredneakhtubinsky District
- Time zone: UTC+4:00

Prikanalny (Russian: Приканальный) is a rural locality (a settlement) in Kirovskoye Rural Settlement, Sredneakhtubinsky District, Volgograd Oblast, Russia. The population was 96 as of 2010. There are 7 streets.

== Geography ==
Prikanalny is located near the Gniloy Erik, 22 km northwest of Srednyaya Akhtuba (the district's administrative centre) by road. Starenky is the nearest rural locality.
