= Verkhnepogromnoye =

Verkhnepogromnoye Верхнепогромное
- Selo
- Location within Volgograd Oblast Location within Russia
- Coordinates: 48°56′N 44°51′E
- Country: Russia
- Region: Volgograd Oblast
- District: Sredneakhtubinsky District
- Time zone: UTC+4:00

Verkhnepogromnoye (Russian: Верхнепогромное) is a rural locality (a selo) and the administrative center of Verkhnepogromenskoye Rural Settlement, Sredneakhtubinsky District, Volgograd Oblast, Russia. The population was 1,963 as of 2010. There are 26 streets.

== Geography ==
Verkhnepogromnoye is located on the Caspian Depression, on the east bank of the Volgograd Reservoir, 39 km northeast of Srednyaya Akhtuba (the district's administrative centre) by road. Volzhanka is the nearest rural locality.
