= Burkovsky =

Burkovsky Бурковский
- Khutor
- Location within Volgograd Oblast Location within Russia
- Coordinates: 48°42′N 44°39′E
- Country: Russia
- Region: Volgograd Oblast
- District: Sredneakhtubinsky District
- Time zone: UTC+4:00

Burkovsky (Russian: Бурковский) is a rural locality (a khutor) in Frunzenskoye Rural Settlement, Sredneakhtubinsky District, Volgograd Oblast, Russia. The population was 866 as of 2010. There are 32 streets.

== Geography ==
Burkovsky is located 16 km west of Srednyaya Akhtuba (the district's administrative centre) by road. Gospitomnik is the nearest rural locality.
