= Trety Reshayushchy =

Trety Reshayushchy Третий Решающий
- Settlement
- Location within Volgograd Oblast Location within Russia
- Coordinates: 48°41′N 44°43′E
- Country: Russia
- Region: Volgograd Oblast
- District: Sredneakhtubinsky District
- Time zone: UTC+4:00

Trety Reshayushchy (Russian: Третий Решающий) is a rural locality (a settlement) in Frunzenskoye Rural Settlement, Sredneakhtubinsky District, Volgograd Oblast, Russia. The population was 334 as of 2010. There are 15 streets.

The name of settlement which means "Third Decisive" is very unusual and is probably related to the Soviet tradition of naming third year of five-year plan "decisive".

== Geography ==
Trety Reshayushchy is located 14 km west of Srednyaya Akhtuba (the district's administrative centre) by road. Rybachy is the nearest rural locality.
