= Tyrly =

Tyrly Тырлы
- Khutor
- Location within Volgograd Oblast Location within Russia
- Coordinates: 48°45′N 44°41′E
- Country: Russia
- Region: Volgograd Oblast
- District: Sredneakhtubinsky District
- Time zone: UTC+4:00

Tyrly (Russian: Тырлы) is a rural locality (a khutor) in Kirovskoye Rural Settlement, Sredneakhtubinsky District, Volgograd Oblast, Russia. The population was 41 as of 2010. There are two streets.

== Geography ==
Tyrly is located 20 km northwest of Srednyaya Akhtuba (the district's administrative centre) by road. Tretya Karta is the nearest rural locality.
