= Stakhanovets =

Stakhanovets Стахановец
- Khutor
- Location within Volgograd Oblast Location within Russia
- Coordinates: 48°40′N 44°47′E
- Country: Russia
- Region: Volgograd Oblast
- District: Sredneakhtubinsky District
- Time zone: UTC+4:00

Stakhanovets (Russian: Стахановец) is a rural locality (a khutor) in Kuybyshevskoye Rural Settlement, Sredneakhtubinsky District, Volgograd Oblast, Russia. The population was 51 as of 2010. There are 7 streets.

== Geography ==
Stakhanovets is located 11 km southwest of Srednyaya Akhtuba (the district's administrative centre) by road. Kashirin is the nearest rural locality.
