= Starenky =

Starenky Старенький
- Khutor
- Location within Volgograd Oblast Location within Russia
- Coordinates: 48°44′N 44°39′E
- Country: Russia
- Region: Volgograd Oblast
- District: Sredneakhtubinsky District
- Time zone: UTC+4:00

Starenky (Russian: Старенький) is a rural locality (a khutor) in Kirovskoye Rural Settlement, Sredneakhtubinsky District, Volgograd Oblast, Russia. The population was 243 as of 2010.

== Geography ==
Starenky is located 24 km northwest of Srednyaya Akhtuba (the district's administrative centre) by road. Prikanalny is the nearest rural locality.
