= Kolkhoznaya Akhtuba =

Kolkhoznaya Akhtuba Колхозная Ахтуба
- Settlement
- Location within Volgograd Oblast Location within Russia
- Coordinates: 48°42′N 44°47′E
- Country: Russia
- Region: Volgograd Oblast
- District: Sredneakhtubinsky District
- Time zone: UTC+4:00

Kolkhoznaya Akhtuba (Russian: Колхозная Ахтуба) is a rural locality (a settlement) and the administrative center of Akhtubinskoye Rural Settlement, Sredneakhtubinsky District, Volgograd Oblast, Russia. The population was 1,261 as of 2010. There are 33 streets.

== Geography ==
Kolkhoznaya Akhtuba is located 5 km west of Srednyaya Akhtuba (the district's administrative centre) by road. Meliorator is the nearest rural locality.
