= Kletsky =

Kletsky (Russian: Клетский; masculine), Kletskaya (Клетская; feminine), or Kletskoye (Клетское; neuter) is the name of several rural localities in Volgograd Oblast, Russia:

- Kletsky (rural locality), a khutor in Kletsky Selsoviet of Sredneakhtubinsky District
- Kletskaya, a stanitsa in Kletsky Selsoviet of Kletsky District
