= Vtoraya Pyatiletka, Russia =

Vtoraya Pyatiletka (Russian: Втора́я Пятиле́тка) or 2-ya Pyatiletka (2-я Пятиле́тка) is the name of several rural localities in Russia:

- 2-ya Pyatiletka, Moscow Oblast, a village in Leontyevskoye Rural Settlement of Stupinsky District of Moscow Oblast
- Vtoraya Pyatiletka, Omsk Oblast, a village in Krasnousovsky Rural Okrug of Tyukalinsky District of Omsk Oblast
- Vtoraya Pyatiletka, Orenburg Oblast, a settlement in Belogorsky Selsoviet of Belyayevsky District of Orenburg Oblast
- 2-ya Pyatiletka, Saratov Oblast, a khutor in Novouzensky District of Saratov Oblast
- 2-ya Pyatiletka, Tambov Oblast, a settlement in Ostroluchinsky Selsoviet of Michurinsky District of Tambov Oblast
- Vtoraya Pyatiletka, Volgograd Oblast, a settlement under the administrative jurisdiction of Krasnoslobodsk Town of District Significance, Sredneakhtubinsky District, Volgograd Oblast
