= Gospitomnik =

Gospitomnik Госпитомник
- Khutor
- Location within Volgograd Oblast Location within Russia
- Coordinates: 48°42′N 44°38′E
- Country: Russia
- Region: Volgograd Oblast
- District: Sredneakhtubinsky District
- Time zone: UTC+4:00

Gospitomnik (Russian: Госпитомник) is a rural locality (a khutor) in Frunzenskoye Rural Settlement, Sredneakhtubinsky District, Volgograd Oblast, Russia. The population was 1,005 as of 2010. There are 20 streets.

== Geography ==
Gospitomnik is located north from Zapornoye Lake, east from Sudomoyka Erik, 18 km west of Srednyaya Akhtuba (the district's administrative centre) by road. Maslovo is the nearest rural locality.
