= Nevidimka, Volgograd Oblast =

Nevidimka Невидимка
- Khutor
- Location within Volgograd Oblast Location within Russia
- Coordinates: 48°36′N 44°48′E
- Country: Russia
- Region: Volgograd Oblast
- District: Sredneakhtubinsky District
- Time zone: UTC+4:00

Nevidimka (Russian: Невидимка) is a rural locality (a khutor) in Kuybyshevskoye Rural Settlement, Sredneakhtubinsky District, Volgograd Oblast, Russia. The population was 35 as of 2010. There are 2 streets.

== Geography ==
Nevidimka is located 18 km southwest of Srednyaya Akhtuba (the district's administrative centre) by road. Chapayevets is the nearest rural locality.
