= Rybachy =

Rybachy (masculine), Rybachya (feminine), or Rybachye (neuter) may refer to:

- Rybachy Peninsula, a peninsula in Murmansk Oblast, Russia
- Rybachy, Russia (Rybachya, Rybachye), several rural localities in Russia
- Rybachy Island, an island in Tyuleny Archipelago, Kazakhstan
- Rybachye, former name of the town of Balykchy, Kyrgyzstan
- Rybache (Rybachye), a rural locality under administrative jurisdiction of the town of Alushta in Crimea
