= Lebyazhya Polyana =

Lebyazhya Polyana Лебяжья Поляна
- Khutor
- Location within Volgograd Oblast Location within Russia
- Coordinates: 48°46′N 44°42′E
- Country: Russia
- Region: Volgograd Oblast
- District: Sredneakhtubinsky District
- Time zone: UTC+4:00

Lebyazhya Polyana (Russian: Лебяжья Поляна) is a rural locality (a khutor) and the administrative center of Kirovskoye Rural Settlement, Sredneakhtubinsky District, Volgograd Oblast, Russia. The population was 950 as of 2010. There are 28 streets.

== Geography ==
Lebyazhya Polyana is located 23 km northwest of Srednyaya Akhtuba (the district's administrative centre) by road. Kirovets is the nearest rural locality.
