= Pervomaysky, Sredneakhtubinsky District, Volgograd Oblast =

Pervomaysky Первомайский
- Settlement
- Location within Volgograd Oblast Location within Russia
- Coordinates: 48°39′N 44°52′E
- Country: Russia
- Region: Volgograd Oblast
- District: Sredneakhtubinsky District
- Time zone: UTC+4:00

Pervomaysky (Russian: Первомайский) is a rural locality (a settlement) in Krasnoye Rural Settlement, Sredneakhtubinsky District, Volgograd Oblast, Russia. The population was 451 as of 2010. There are 16 streets.

== Geography ==
Pervomaysky is located 9 km southeast of Srednyaya Akhtuba (the district's administrative centre) by road. Kuybyshev is the nearest rural locality.
