= Vosmoye Marta, Sredneakhtubinsky District, Volgograd Oblast =

Vosmoye Marta Восьмое Марта
- Settlement
- Location within Volgograd Oblast Location within Russia
- Coordinates: 49°01′N 45°20′E
- Country: Russia
- Region: Volgograd Oblast
- District: Sredneakhtubinsky District
- Time zone: UTC+4:00

Vosmoye Marta (Russian: Восьмое Марта) is a rural locality (a settlement) in Krasnooktyabrskoye Rural Settlement, Sredneakhtubinsky District, Volgograd Oblast, Russia. The population was 19 as of 2010.

== Geography ==
Vosmoye Marta is located 81 km northeast of Srednyaya Akhtuba (the district's administrative centre) by road. Krasny Oktyabr is the nearest rural locality.
