= Shumrovaty =

Shumrovaty Шумроватый
- Khutor
- Location within Volgograd Oblast Location within Russia
- Coordinates: 48°37′N 44°51′E
- Country: Russia
- Region: Volgograd Oblast
- District: Sredneakhtubinsky District
- Time zone: UTC+4:00

Shumrovaty (Russian: Шумроватый) is a rural locality (a khutor) in Kuybyshevskoye Rural Settlement, Sredneakhtubinsky District, Volgograd Oblast, Russia. The population was 63 as of 2010. There are 5 streets.

== Geography ==
Shumrovaty is located 13 km south of Srednyaya Akhtuba (the district's administrative centre) by road. Sukhodol is the nearest rural locality.
