= Krivusha =

Krivusha Кривуша
- Khutor
- Location within Volgograd Oblast Location within Russia
- Coordinates: 48°33′N 44°43′E
- Country: Russia
- Region: Volgograd Oblast
- District: Sredneakhtubinsky District
- Time zone: UTC+4:00

Krivusha (Russian: Кривуша) is a rural locality (a khutor) in Kletskoye Rural Settlement, Sredneakhtubinsky District, Volgograd Oblast, Russia. The population was 128 as of 2010. There are 7 streets.

== Geography ==
Krivusha is located near the river, 38 km southwest of Srednyaya Akhtuba (the district's administrative centre) by road. Plamenka is the nearest rural locality.
