= Krasny Partizan =

Krasny Partizan Красный Партизан
- Settlement
- Location within Volgograd Oblast Location within Russia
- Coordinates: 48°55′N 45°11′E
- Country: Russia
- Region: Volgograd Oblast
- District: Sredneakhtubinsky District
- Time zone: UTC+4:00

Krasny Partizan (Russian: Красный Партизан) is a rural locality (a settlement) in Krasnooktyabrskoye Rural Settlement, Sredneakhtubinsky District, Volgograd Oblast, Russia. The population was 33 as of 2010.

== Geography ==
Krasny Partizan is located 65 km northeast of Srednyaya Akhtuba (the district's administrative centre) by road. Maksima Gorkogo is the nearest rural locality.
