= Novenky =

Novenky Новенький
- Khutor
- Location within Volgograd Oblast Location within Russia
- Coordinates: 48°42′N 44°45′E
- Country: Russia
- Region: Volgograd Oblast
- District: Sredneakhtubinsky District
- Time zone: UTC+4:00

Novenky (Russian: Новенький) is a rural locality (a khutor) in Akhtubinskoye Rural Settlement, Sredneakhtubinsky District, Volgograd Oblast, Russia. The population was 283 as of 2010. There are 18 streets.

== Geography ==
Novenky is located 9 km west of Srednyaya Akhtuba (the district's administrative centre) by road. Rybachy is the nearest rural locality.
