= Standartny =

Standartny Стандартный
- Settlement
- Location within Volgograd Oblast Location within Russia
- Coordinates: 48°42′N 44°56′E
- Country: Russia
- Region: Volgograd Oblast
- District: Sredneakhtubinsky District
- Time zone: UTC+4:00

Standartny (Russian: Стандартный) is a rural locality (a settlement) in Krasnoye Rural Settlement, Sredneakhtubinsky District, Volgograd Oblast, Russia. The population was 229 as of 2010. There are 7 streets.

== Geography ==
Standartny is located 7 km east of Srednyaya Akhtuba (the district's administrative centre) by road. Zayar is the nearest rural locality.
