= Bulgakov, Sredneakhtubinsky District, Volgograd Oblast =

Bulgakov Булгаков
- Khutor
- Location within Volgograd Oblast Location within Russia
- Coordinates: 48°33′N 44°57′E
- Country: Russia
- Region: Volgograd Oblast
- District: Sredneakhtubinsky District
- Time zone: UTC+4:00

Bulgakov (Russian: Булгаков) is a rural locality (a khutor) in Sukhodolskoye Rural Settlement, Sredneakhtubinsky District, Volgograd Oblast, Russia. The population was 11 as of 2010. There are 2 streets.

== Geography ==
Bulgakov is located on the left bank of the Bulgakov Erik, 21 km SSE of Srednyaya Akhtuba (the district's administrative centre) by road. Talovy is the nearest rural locality.
