= Pryshchevka =

Pryshchevka Прыщевка
- Khutor
- Location within Volgograd Oblast Location within Russia
- Coordinates: 48°35′N 44°40′E
- Country: Russia
- Region: Volgograd Oblast
- District: Sredneakhtubinsky District
- Time zone: UTC+4:00

Pryshchevka (Russian: Прыщевка) is a rural locality (a khutor) in Kletskoye Rural Settlement, Sredneakhtubinsky District, Volgograd Oblast, Russia. The population was 165 as of 2010. There are 10 streets.

== Geography ==
Pryshchevka is located 31 km southwest of Srednyaya Akhtuba (the district's administrative centre) by road. Kletsky is the nearest rural locality.
