= Krasny Buksir =

Krasny Buksir Красный Буксир
- Settlement
- Location within Volgograd Oblast Location within Russia
- Coordinates: 48°43′N 44°42′E
- Country: Russia
- Region: Volgograd Oblast
- District: Sredneakhtubinsky District
- Time zone: UTC+4:00

Krasny Buksir (Russian: Красный Буксир) is a rural locality (a settlement) in Kirovskoye Rural Settlement, Sredneakhtubinsky District, Volgograd Oblast, Russia. The population was 236 as of 2010. There are 16 streets.

== Geography ==
Krasny Buksir is located 16 km west of Srednyaya Akhtuba (the district's administrative centre) by road. Morozkino is the nearest rural locality.
