= Yamy, Volgograd Oblast =

Yamy Ямы
- Khutor
- Location within Volgograd Oblast Location within Russia
- Coordinates: 48°39′N 44°36′E
- Country: Russia
- Region: Volgograd Oblast
- District: Sredneakhtubinsky District
- Time zone: UTC+4:00

Yamy (Russian: Ямы) is a rural locality (a khutor) in Kletskoye Rural Settlement, Sredneakhtubinsky District, Volgograd Oblast, Russia. The population was 400 as of 2010. There are 17 streets.

== Geography ==
Yamy is located 40 km southwest of Srednyaya Akhtuba (the district's administrative centre) by road. Peschanka is the nearest rural locality.
