= Kirovets, Volgograd Oblast =

Kirovets Кировец
- Settlement
- Location within Volgograd Oblast Location within Russia
- Coordinates: 48°45′N 44°43′E
- Country: Russia
- Region: Volgograd Oblast
- District: Sredneakhtubinsky District
- Time zone: UTC+4:00

Kirovets (Russian: Кировец) is a rural locality (a settlement) in Kirovskoye Rural Settlement, Sredneakhtubinsky District, Volgograd Oblast, Russia. The population was 723 as of 2010. There are 41 streets.

== Geography ==
Kirovets is located on the Akhtuba River, 20 km northwest of Srednyaya Akhtuba (the district's administrative centre) by road. Tretya Karta is the nearest rural locality.
