= Tumak, Volgograd Oblast =

Tumak Тумак
- Khutor
- Location within Volgograd Oblast Location within Russia
- Coordinates: 48°37′N 44°37′E
- Country: Russia
- Region: Volgograd Oblast
- District: Sredneakhtubinsky District
- Time zone: UTC+4:00

Tumak (Russian: Тумак) is a rural locality (a khutor) in Kletskoye Rural Settlement, Sredneakhtubinsky District, Volgograd Oblast, Russia. The population was 279 as of 2010. There are 4 streets.

== Geography ==
Tumak is located 37 km southwest of Srednyaya Akhtuba (the district's administrative centre) by road. Pryshchevka is the nearest rural locality.
