= Chapayevets =

Chapayevets Чапаевец
- Khutor
- Location within Volgograd Oblast Location within Russia
- Coordinates: 48°35′N 44°51′E
- Country: Russia
- Region: Volgograd Oblast
- District: Sredneakhtubinsky District
- Time zone: UTC+4:00

Chapayevets (Russian: Чапаевец) is a rural locality (a khutor) in Sukhodolskoye Rural Settlement, Sredneakhtubinsky District, Volgograd Oblast, Russia. The population was 205 as of 2010. There are 4 streets.

== Geography ==
Chapayevets is located 17 km south of Srednyaya Akhtuba (the district's administrative centre) by road. Malyayevskiye Dachi is the nearest rural locality.
