= Rybachy, Russia =

Rybachy (Russian: Рыба́чий; masculine), Rybachya (Рыба́чья; feminine), or Rybachye (Рыба́чье; neuter) is the name of several rural localities in Russia:

- Rybachy, Kaliningrad Oblast, a settlement in Kurshsky Rural Okrug of Zelenogradsky District in Kaliningrad Oblast
- Rybachy, Republic of Kalmykia, a settlement in Kumskaya Rural Administration of Chernozemelsky District in the Republic of Kalmykia; 45°00′N 45°51′E
- Rybachy, Primorsky Krai, a settlement in Nadezhdinsky District of Primorsky Krai
- Rybachy, Samara Oblast, a settlement under the administrative jurisdiction of the town of oblast significance of Chapayevsk in Samara Oblast
- Rybachy, Volgograd Oblast, a settlement in Frunzensky Selsoviet of Sredneakhtubinsky District in Volgograd Oblast
- Rybachye, a selo under the administrative jurisdiction of the town of republic significance of Alushta in the Republic of Crimea
