= Tutov =

Tutov Тутов
- Khutor
- Location within Volgograd Oblast Location within Russia
- Coordinates: 48°44′N 44°44′E
- Country: Russia
- Region: Volgograd Oblast
- District: Sredneakhtubinsky District
- Time zone: UTC+4:00

Tutov (Russian: Тутов) is a rural locality (a khutor) in Akhtubinskoye Rural Settlement, Sredneakhtubinsky District, Volgograd Oblast, Russia. The population was 84 as of 2010. There are 6 streets.

== Geography ==
Tutov is located near Pakhotny Erik, 11 km northwest of Srednyaya Akhtuba (the district's administrative centre) by road. Bruny is the nearest rural locality.
