= Kochetkovo =

Kochetkovo Кочетково
- Khutor
- Location within Volgograd Oblast Location within Russia
- Coordinates: 48°38′N 44°51′E
- Country: Russia
- Region: Volgograd Oblast
- District: Sredneakhtubinsky District
- Time zone: UTC+4:00

Kochetkovo (Russian: Кочетково) is a rural locality (a khutor) in Kuybyshevskoye Rural Settlement, Sredneakhtubinsky District, Volgograd Oblast, Russia. The population was 185 as of 2010. There are 5 streets.

== Geography ==
Kochetkovo is located 10 km south of Srednyaya Akhtuba (the district's administrative centre) by road. Pervomaysky is the nearest rural locality.
