= Maslovo, Volgograd Oblast =

Maslovo Маслово
- Settlement
- Location within Volgograd Oblast Location within Russia
- Coordinates: 48°42′N 44°39′E
- Country: Russia
- Region: Volgograd Oblast
- District: Sredneakhtubinsky District
- Time zone: UTC+4:00

Maslovo (Russian: Маслово) is a rural locality (a settlement) in Frunzenskoye Rural Settlement, Sredneakhtubinsky District, Volgograd Oblast, Russia. The population was 461 as of 2010. There are 13 streets.

== Geography ==
Maslovo is located 17 km west of Srednyaya Akhtuba (the district's administrative centre) by road. Burkovsky is the nearest rural locality.
