= Rybachy, Volgograd Oblast =

Rybachy Рыбачий
- Settlement
- Location within Volgograd Oblast Location within Russia
- Coordinates: 48°42′N 44°44′E
- Country: Russia
- Region: Volgograd Oblast
- District: Sredneakhtubinsky District
- Time zone: UTC+4:00

Rybachy (Russian: Рыбачий) is a rural locality (a settlement) in Frunzenskoye Rural Settlement, Sredneakhtubinsky District, Volgograd Oblast, Russia. The population was 201 as of 2010. There are 8 streets.

== Geography ==
Rybachy is located 10 km west of Srednyaya Akhtuba (the district's administrative centre) by road. Novenky is the nearest rural locality.
