= Zonalny =

Zonalny (masculine), Zonalnaya (feminine), or Zonalnoye (neuter) may refer to:

- Zonalny District, a district of Altai Krai, Russia
- Zonalny (rural locality) (Zonalnaya, Zonalnoye), name of several rural localities in Russia
- Zonalnoye Airport, an airport in Sakhalin Oblast, Russia
