= Zonalny, Volgograd Oblast =

Zonalny Зональный
- Khutor
- Location within Volgograd Oblast Location within Russia
- Coordinates: 48°44′N 44°41′E
- Country: Russia
- Region: Volgograd Oblast
- District: Sredneakhtubinsky District
- Time zone: UTC+4:00

Zonalny (Russian: Зональный) is a rural locality (a khutor) in Kirovskoye Rural Settlement, Sredneakhtubinsky District, Volgograd Oblast, Russia. The population was 70 as of 2010. There are 9 streets.

== Geography ==
Zonalny is located near the Gniloy Erik, 18 km northwest of Srednyaya Akhtuba (the district's administrative centre) by road. Krasny Buksir is the nearest rural locality.
