= Zonalny (rural locality) =

Zonalny (Russian: Зональный; masculine), Zonalnaya (Зональная; feminine), or Zonalnoye (Зональное; neuter) is the name of several rural localities in Russia:

- Zonalny, Novosibirsk Oblast, a settlement in Iskitimsky District of Novosibirsk Oblast
- Zonalny, Sverdlovsk Oblast, a settlement in Prigorodny District of Sverdlovsk Oblast
- Zonalny, Volgograd Oblast, a khutor in Kirovsky Selsoviet of Sredneakhtubinsky District of Volgograd Oblast
- Zonalnoye, Altai Krai, a selo in Zonalny Selsoviet of Zonalny District of Altai Krai
- Zonalnoye, Sakhalin Oblast, a selo in Tymovsky District of Sakhalin Oblast

== Renamed localities ==
- Loris, Russia, a rural locality under the administrative jurisdiction of Karasunsky Okrug of the city of Krasnodar, Krasnodar Krai, called Zonalny until July 2011

== See also ==
- Tatarskoy zonalnoy opytnoy stantsii, a settlement in Kamsko-Ustyinsky District of the Republic of Tatarstan
- Zonalnaya Stantsiya, a settlement in Tomsky District of Tomsk Oblast
