= Vtoraya Pyatiletka =

Vtoraya Pyatiletka or 2-ya Pyatiletka may refer to:

- Second five-year plan (Soviet Union) (1933–1937) for the national economy of the Soviet Union
- Vtoraya Pyatiletka, Kazakhstan, a village in the Almaty Province, Kazakhstan
- Vtoraya Pyatiletka, Russia, name of several rural localities in Russia
