= Kletsky (rural locality) =

Kletsky Клетский
- Khutor
- Location within Volgograd Oblast Location within Russia
- Coordinates: 48°35′N 44°41′E
- Country: Russia
- Region: Volgograd Oblast
- District: Sredneakhtubinsky District
- Time zone: UTC+4:00

Kletsky (Russian: Клетский) is a rural locality (a khutor) and the administrative center of Kletskoye Rural Settlement, Sredneakhtubinsky District, Volgograd Oblast, Russia. The population was 1,666 as of 2010. There are 35 streets.

== Geography ==
Kletsky is located on the north bank of the Kletskoye Lake, 28 km southwest of Srednyaya Akhtuba (the district's administrative centre) by road. Pryshchevka is the nearest rural locality.
