= Repino, Volgograd Oblast =

Repino Репино
- Khutor
- Location within Volgograd Oblast Location within Russia
- Coordinates: 48°33′N 44°47′E
- Country: Russia
- Region: Volgograd Oblast
- District: Sredneakhtubinsky District
- Time zone: UTC+4:00

Repino (Russian: Репино) is a rural locality (a khutor) in Kletskoye Rural Settlement, Sredneakhtubinsky District, Volgograd Oblast, Russia. The population was 269 as of 2010.

== Geography ==
Repino is located on the bank of the Repin Erik, 45 km southwest of Srednyaya Akhtuba (the district's administrative centre) by road. Krivusha is the nearest rural locality.
