= Vtoraya Pyatiletka, Volgograd Oblast =

Vtoraya Pyatiletka Вторая Пятилетка
- Settlement
- Location within Volgograd Oblast Location within Russia
- Coordinates: 48°39′N 44°33′E
- Country: Russia
- Region: Volgograd Oblast
- District: Sredneakhtubinsky District
- Time zone: UTC+4:00

Vtoraya Pyatiletka (Russian: Вторая Пятилетка) is a rural locality (a settlement) in Krasnoslobodsk, Sredneakhtubinsky District, Volgograd Oblast, Russia. The population was 714 in 2010.
