= Sakharny, Volgograd Oblast =

Sakharny Сахарный
- Khutor
- Location within Volgograd Oblast Location within Russia
- Coordinates: 48°41′N 44°37′E
- Country: Russia
- Region: Volgograd Oblast
- District: Sredneakhtubinsky District
- Time zone: UTC+4:00

Sakharny (Russian: Сахарный) is a rural locality (a khutor) in Frunzenskoye Rural Settlement, Sredneakhtubinsky District, Volgograd Oblast, Russia. The population was 169 as of 2010. There are 10 streets.

== Geography ==
Sakharny is located 23 km west of Srednyaya Akhtuba (the district's administrative centre) by road. Peschanka is the nearest rural locality.
