= Oleksandr Vysotskyi =

Ukrainian footballer

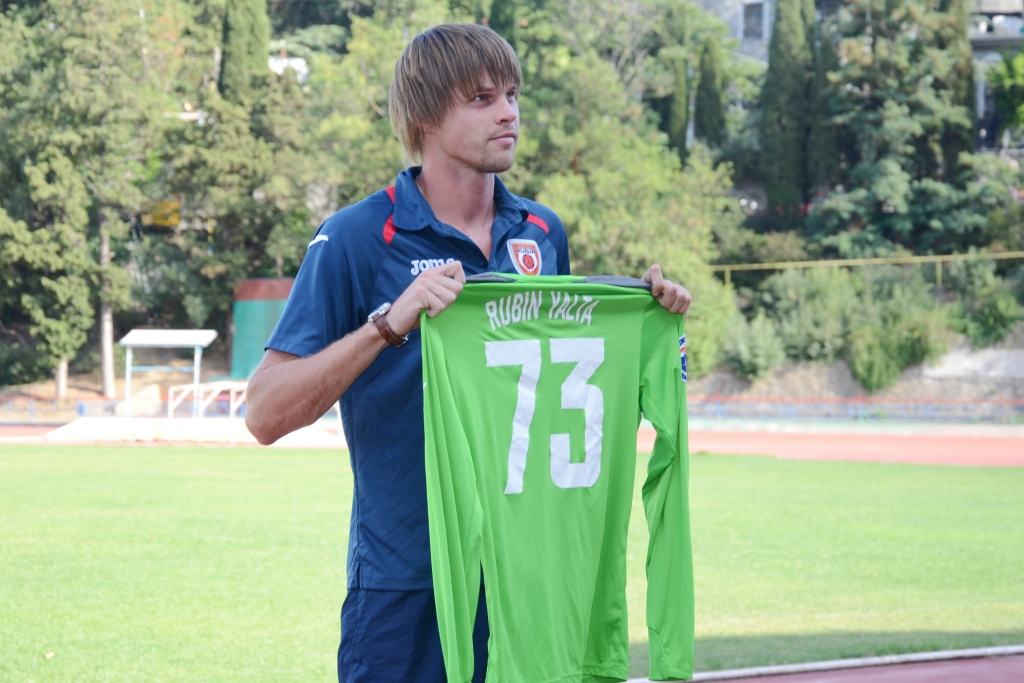

Personal information
- Full name: Oleksandr Oleksandrovych Vysotskyi
- Date of birth: 16 June 1986 (age 40)
- Place of birth: Alushta, Ukraine, Soviet Union
- Height: 2.00 m (6 ft 7 in)
- Position: Goalkeeper

Senior career*
Years	Team	Apps	(Gls)
2008–2010	FC Lviv	0	(0)
2009–2010	→ FC Lviv-2	3	(0)
2011	FC SKAD-Yalpuh Bolhrad	16	(0)
2012	FC Hirnyk Kryvyi Rih	0	(0)
2012	FC Tytan Armiansk	0	(0)
2013	FC Dynamo Khmelnytskyi	0	(0)
2013	FC Hirnyk Kryvyi Rih	0	(0)
2013–2014	FC Tytan Armiansk	0	(0)
2015–2016	FC Rubin Yalta	22	(0)
- * Club domestic league appearances and goals

Oleksandr Oleksandrovych Vysotskyi (born 16 June 1986 in) is a Ukrainian former professional football goalkeeper.
