= Vtoraya Pyatiletka, Kazakhstan =

Vtoraya Pyatiletka
- Interactive map of Vtoraya Pyatiletka
- Country: Kazakhstan
- Region: Almaty Region
- Time zone: UTC+6 (Omsk Time)

Vtoraya Pyatiletka is a village in Almaty Region of south-eastern Kazakhstan.
