= Krasnoslobodsk, Volgograd Oblast =

Town in Volgograd Oblast, Russia

Krasnoslobodsk Краснослободск
- Town
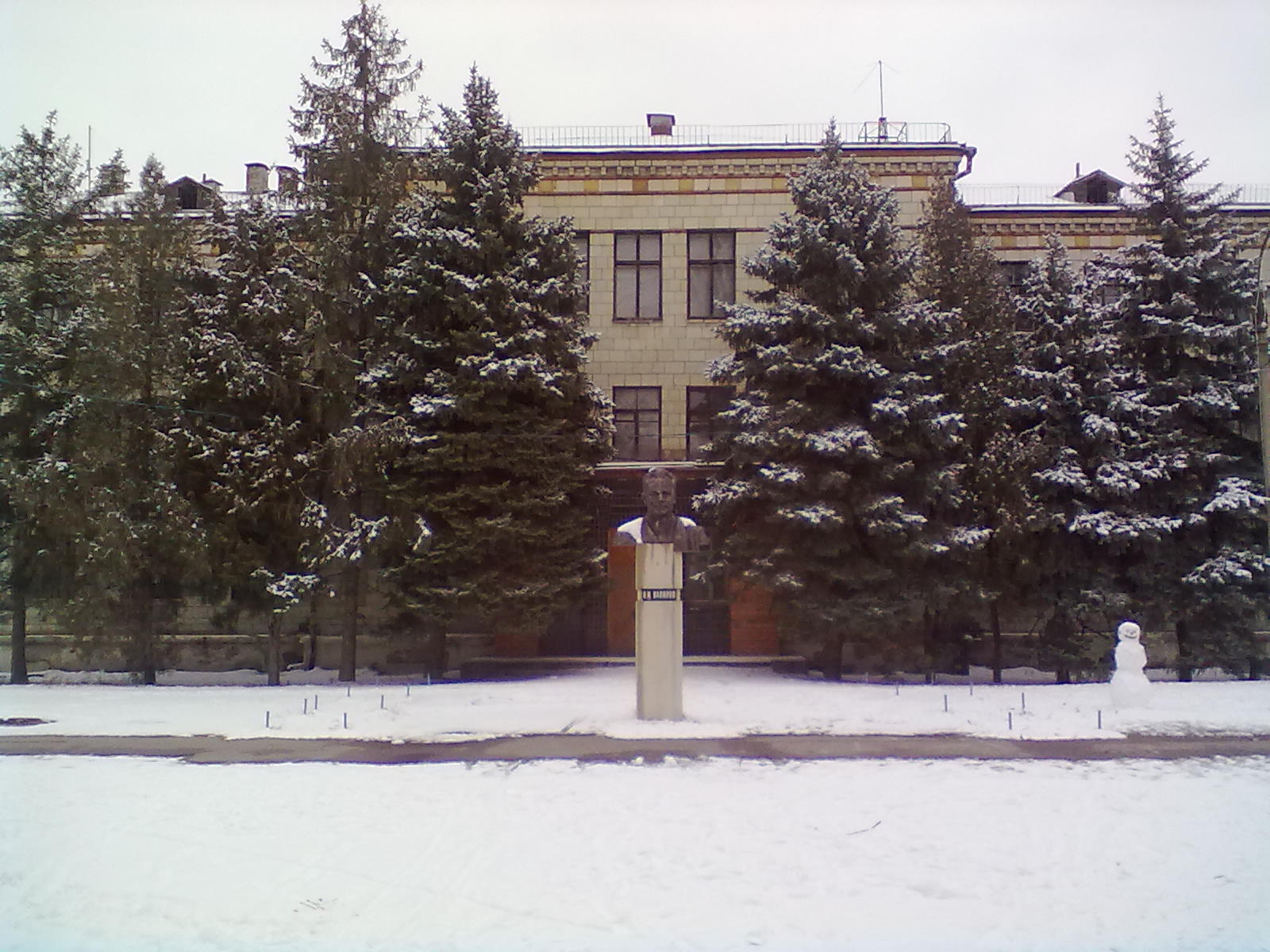
- Crop research institute building in Krasnoslobodsk

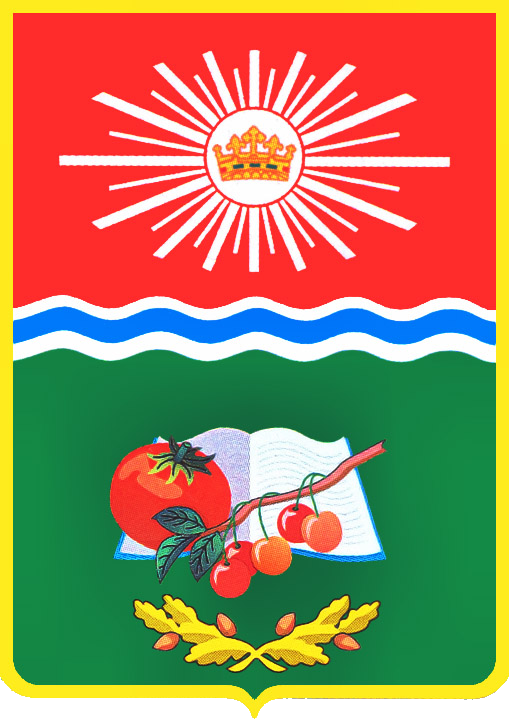
- Coat of arms
- Interactive map of Krasnoslobodsk
- Location of Krasnoslobodsk Krasnoslobodsk (Volgograd Oblast)
- Coordinates: 48°42′N 44°34′E
- Country: Russia
- Federal subject: Volgograd Oblast
- Administrative district: Sredneakhtubinsky District
- Town of district significanceSelsoviet: Krasnoslobodsk
- Founded: 1870
- Town status since: 1955
- Elevation: 0 m (0 ft)

Population (2010 Census)
  - Total: 15,998
  - Estimate (1 January 2024): 16,419 (+2.6%)

Administrative status
  - Capital of: town of district significance of Krasnoslobodsk

Municipal status
  - Municipal district: Sredneakhtubinsky Municipal District
  - Urban settlement: Krasnoslobodsk Urban Settlement
  - Capital of: Krasnoslobodsk Urban Settlement
- Time zone: UTC+3 (MSK)
- Postal code: 404160
- OKTMO ID: 18651107001
- Website: web.archive.org/web/20131203053419/http://www.krasnoslobodsk34.ru/

Krasnoslobodsk (Russian: Краснослобо́дск) is a town in Sredneakhtubinsky District of Volgograd Oblast, Russia, located on the east bank of the Volga River across from Volgograd, the administrative center of the oblast. Population: 15,998 (2010 census); 14,359 (2002 census); 13,533 (1989 Soviet census).

Krasnoslobodsk has the geographical peculiarity of being located on (at the western end of) one of the largest inland river islands in the world.

== History ==
It was founded as the khutor of Bukatin (Букатин). After 1917, it was renamed Krasnaya Sloboda (Кра́сная Слобода́). In 1955, it was given its present name and granted town status. Krasnaya Sloboda was a Suburb of Stalingrad. In 1942 German forces reached the Volga opposite the town, but were defeated in 1943.

== Administrative and municipal status ==
Within the framework of administrative divisions, it is, together with three rural localities, incorporated within Sredneakhtubinsky District as the town of district significance of Krasnoslobodsk. As a municipal division, the territory of Krasnoslobodsk and two of the rural localities are incorporated within Sredneakhtubinsky Municipal District as Krasnoslobodsk Urban Settlement. The remaining rural locality (the khutor of Sakharny) is incorporated as a part of Frunzenskoye Rural Settlement in Sredneakhtubinsky Municipal District.
