= Repino, Vladimir Oblast =

Repino Репино
- Selo
- Location within Vladimir Oblast Location within Russia
- Coordinates: 55°27′N 41°58′E
- Country: Russia
- Region: Vladimir Oblast
- District: Melenkovsky District
- Time zone: UTC+3:00

Repino (Russian: Ре́пино) is a rural locality (a selo) in Turgenevskoye Rural Settlement, Melenkovsky District, Vladimir Oblast, Russia. The population was 30 as of 2010. There are 5 streets.

== Geography ==
Repino is located 41 km northeast of Melenki (the district's administrative centre) by road. Urvanovo is the nearest rural locality.
