= Pyatiletka, Austrumsky Selsoviet, Iglinsky District, Republic of Bashkortostan =

Pyatiletka Пятилетка
- Village
- Location within Bashkortostan Location within Russia
- Coordinates: 54°44′N 56°48′E
- Country: Russia
- Region: Bashkortostan
- District: Iglinsky District
- Time zone: UTC+5:00

Pyatiletka (Russian: Пятилетка) is a rural locality (a village) in Austrumsky Selsoviet, Iglinsky District, Bashkortostan, Russia. The population was 238 as of 2010.

== Geography ==
It is located 50 km from Iglino and 14 km from Austrum.
