= Alushta =

City in Crimea

Alushta: Алушта; Aluşta
- City
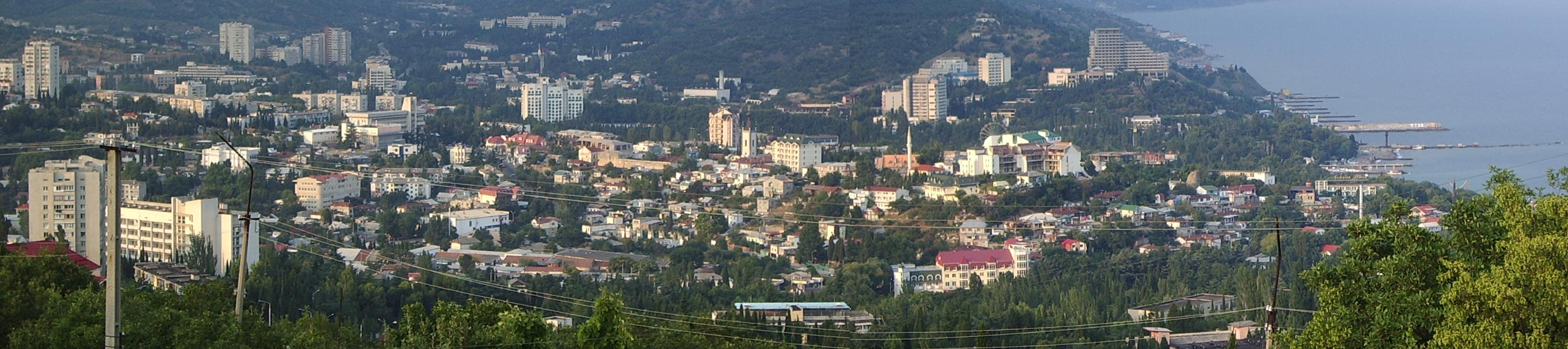

- Flag Coat of arms
- Interactive map of Alushta
- Location of Alushta within Crimea Alushta (Ukraine)
- Coordinates: 44°40′2″N 34°23′52″E
- Country: Ukraine (occupied by Russia)
- Autonomous republic: Crimea
- Municipality: Alushta Municipality

Area
  - Total: 6.983 km^{2} (2.696 sq mi)
- Elevation: 50 m (160 ft)

Population (2025)
  - Total: 29,641
  - Density: 4,245/km^{2} (10,990/sq mi)
- Time zone: UTC+2 (MSK)
- Postal code: 98500 — 98519
- Area code: +380-6560
- Former name: Aluston ('till the 15th century)
- Climate: Cfa

Alushta or Aluşta (Note: Ukrainian and Russian: Алушта; Crimean Tatar: Aluşta; Greek: Ἄλουστον, romanized: Álouston) is a city of regional significance on the southern coast of the Crimean peninsula which is within the Autonomous Republic of Crimea, a region internationally recognised as territory of Ukraine, but occupied by the Russian Federation and incorporated as the Republic of Crimea. It is located along the Black Sea coast on the road from Gurzuf to Sudak, as well as on the Crimean Trolleybus line. According to the 2014 Census, Alushta had a population of 29,078.

The area is notable for its arid, rocky terrain due to its proximity to the Crimean Mountains. During Byzantine times, the town was called Alouston (Ἄλουστον) meaning "Unwashed". Vestiges survive of a Byzantine defensive tower from a fortress from which the town's name was derived, as well as a 15th-century Genoese fortress. During Genoese rule, the name was modified to Lusta. Adam Mickiewicz dedicated two of his Crimean Sonnets to Alushta.

== History ==
In 1910, 544 Jews lived in Alushta, comprising 13% of the town's population. By 1939, they made up only 2.3% of the town's overall population, numbering 251 individuals. On 4 November 1941, the Germans occupied the town. On 24 November 1941, a unit of SS-Sonderkommando 10b murdered 30 Jews by shooting along with captured communists and partisans. In early December 1941, about 250 Jews from Alushta were shot to death by SS-Sonderkommando 11b in the park of Trade Union Sanatorium No. 7, which is today part of the local center for children and creativity.

== Geography ==
=== Climate ===
Alushta has a humid subtropical climate (Köppen climate classification: Cfa) that closely borders on a hot-summer Mediterranean climate (Köppen climate classification: Csa).

Climate data for Alushta (1981–2010)
Month	Jan	Feb	Mar	Apr	May	Jun	Jul	Aug	Sep	Oct	Nov	Dec	Year
Mean daily maximum °C (°F)	6.8 (44.2)	6.7 (44.1)	9.2 (48.6)	13.9 (57.0)	19.6 (67.3)	24.6 (76.3)	28.0 (82.4)	27.9 (82.2)	23.3 (73.9)	17.7 (63.9)	12.2 (54.0)	8.4 (47.1)	16.5 (61.7)
Daily mean °C (°F)	3.6 (38.5)	3.1 (37.6)	5.4 (41.7)	10.1 (50.2)	15.3 (59.5)	20.2 (68.4)	23.4 (74.1)	23.4 (74.1)	18.5 (65.3)	13.2 (55.8)	8.2 (46.8)	5.0 (41.0)	12.5 (54.5)
Mean daily minimum °C (°F)	0.8 (33.4)	0.1 (32.2)	2.2 (36.0)	6.7 (44.1)	11.3 (52.3)	15.9 (60.6)	19.0 (66.2)	18.5 (65.3)	14.0 (57.2)	9.3 (48.7)	4.8 (40.6)	2.1 (35.8)	8.7 (47.7)
Average precipitation mm (inches)	46.9 (1.85)	42.5 (1.67)	37.9 (1.49)	29.5 (1.16)	24.3 (0.96)	39.4 (1.55)	32.4 (1.28)	41.4 (1.63)	34.2 (1.35)	38.0 (1.50)	44.4 (1.75)	52.6 (2.07)	463.5 (18.25)
Average precipitation days (≥ 1.0 mm)	8.0	7.1	6.8	5.6	5.7	5.7	4.1	4.3	4.2	4.9	7.0	8.2	71.6
Average relative humidity (%)	78.7	77.5	77.1	77.1	74.7	71.3	65.5	64.7	70.0	75.6	78.9	78.5	74.1
Source: NCEI

== Demographics ==
Ethnic composition according to the Ukrainian national census in 2001:

Ethnic groups in Alushta
	percent
Russians	57.09%
Ukrainians	32.96%
Crimean Tatars	5.90%
Belarusians	1.42%
Armenians	0.43%
Moldovans	0.20%
Azerbaijanis	0.20%
Tatars	0.18%
Poles	0.16%
Ashkenazi Jews	0.14%

== International relations ==
=== Twin towns — Sister cities ===
Alushta is twinned with:

- Santa Cruz, United States
- Dzierżoniów, Poland
- Äänekoski, Central Finland
- Jūrmala, Latvia

== Notable people ==
- Mykhailo Kotsiubynsky (1864–1913), Ukrainian author
- Sabri Ülker (1920–2012), Turkish businessman and founder of Ülker
- Rustem Umerov (born 1982), Ukrainian politician and former Minister of Defense
- Oleksandr Vysotskyi (born 1986), Ukrainian football player
- Oleksandr Nedovyesov (born 1987), Ukrainian-Kazakhstani tennis player

== Gallery ==
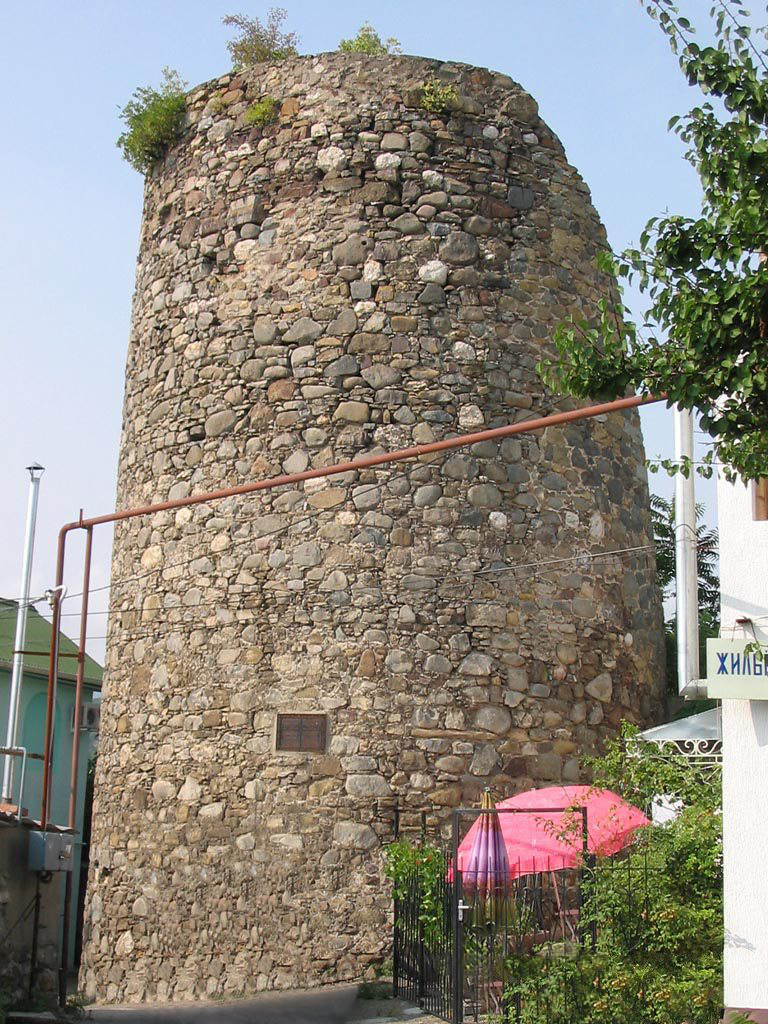
15th century Genoese tower in Alushta

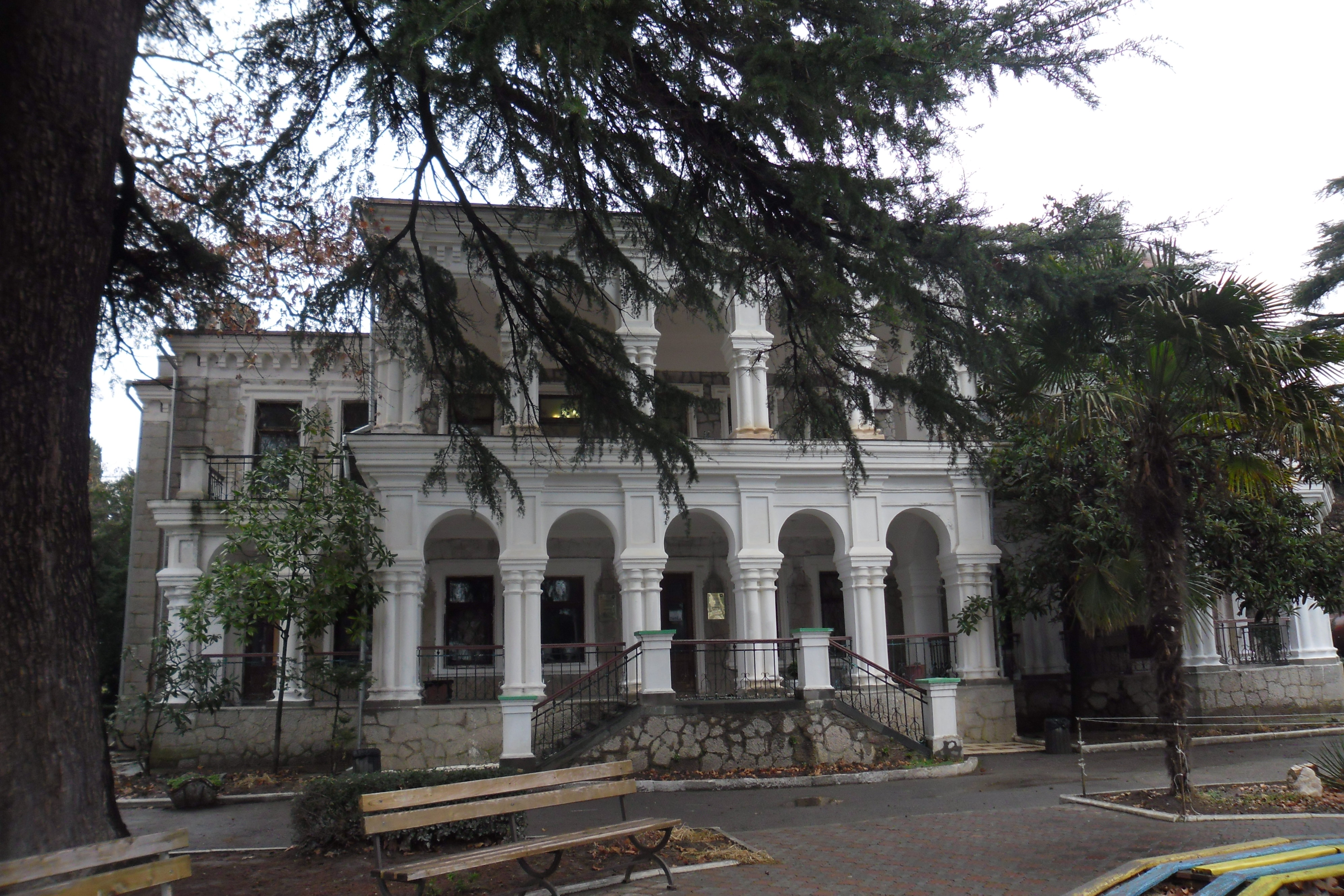
Villa "Otrada" (Stakheev's dacha)

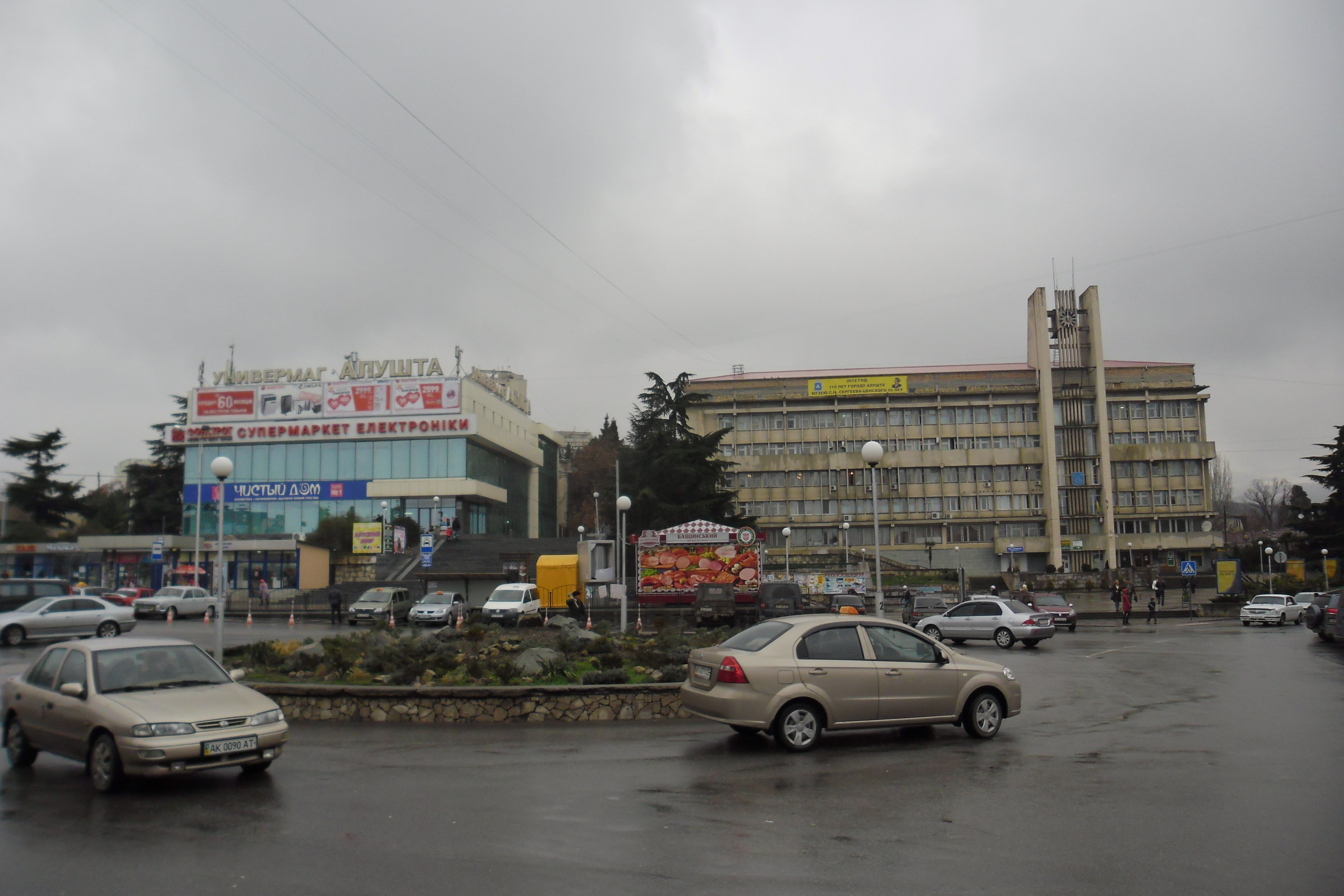
Downtown Alushta

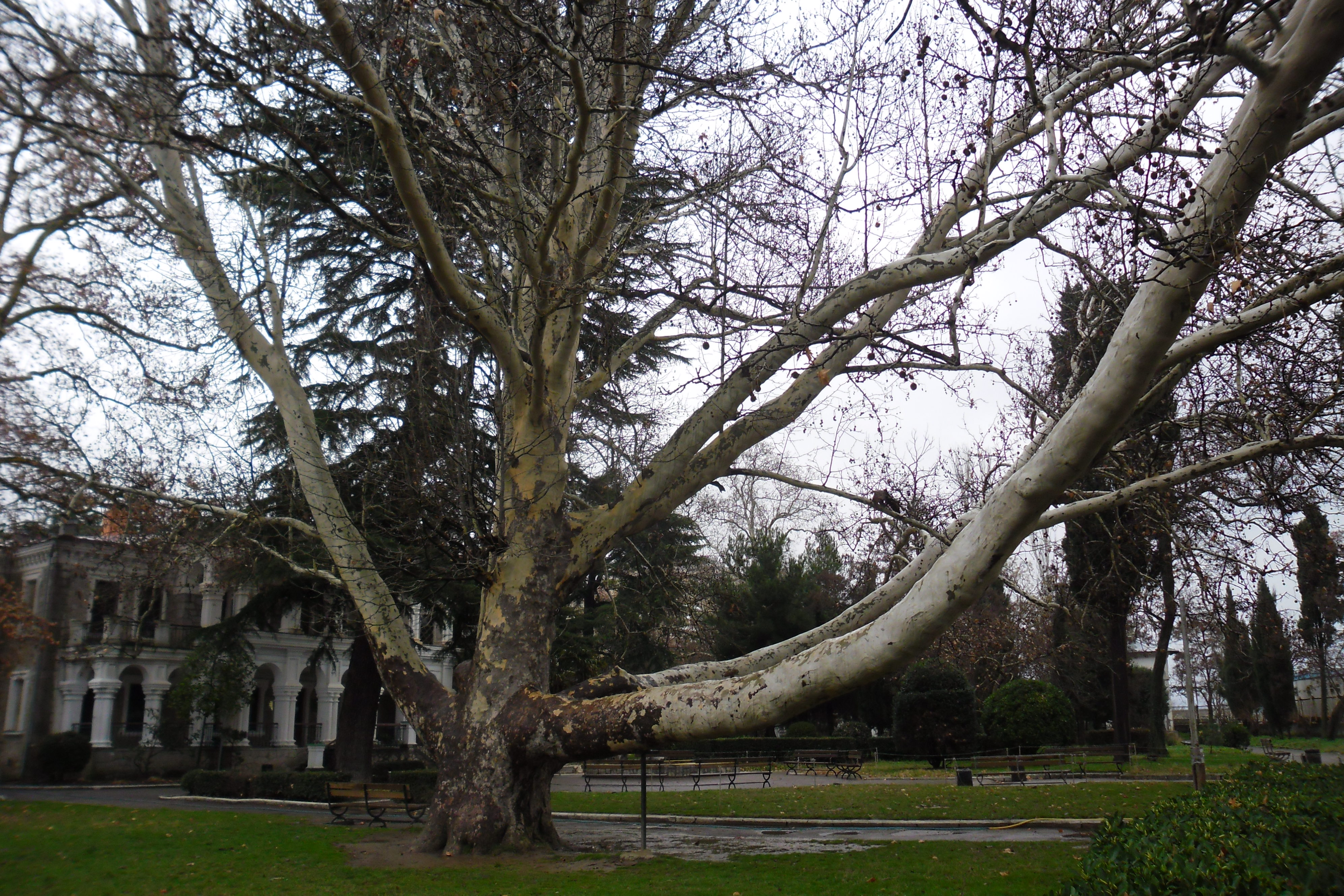
Park Alushti

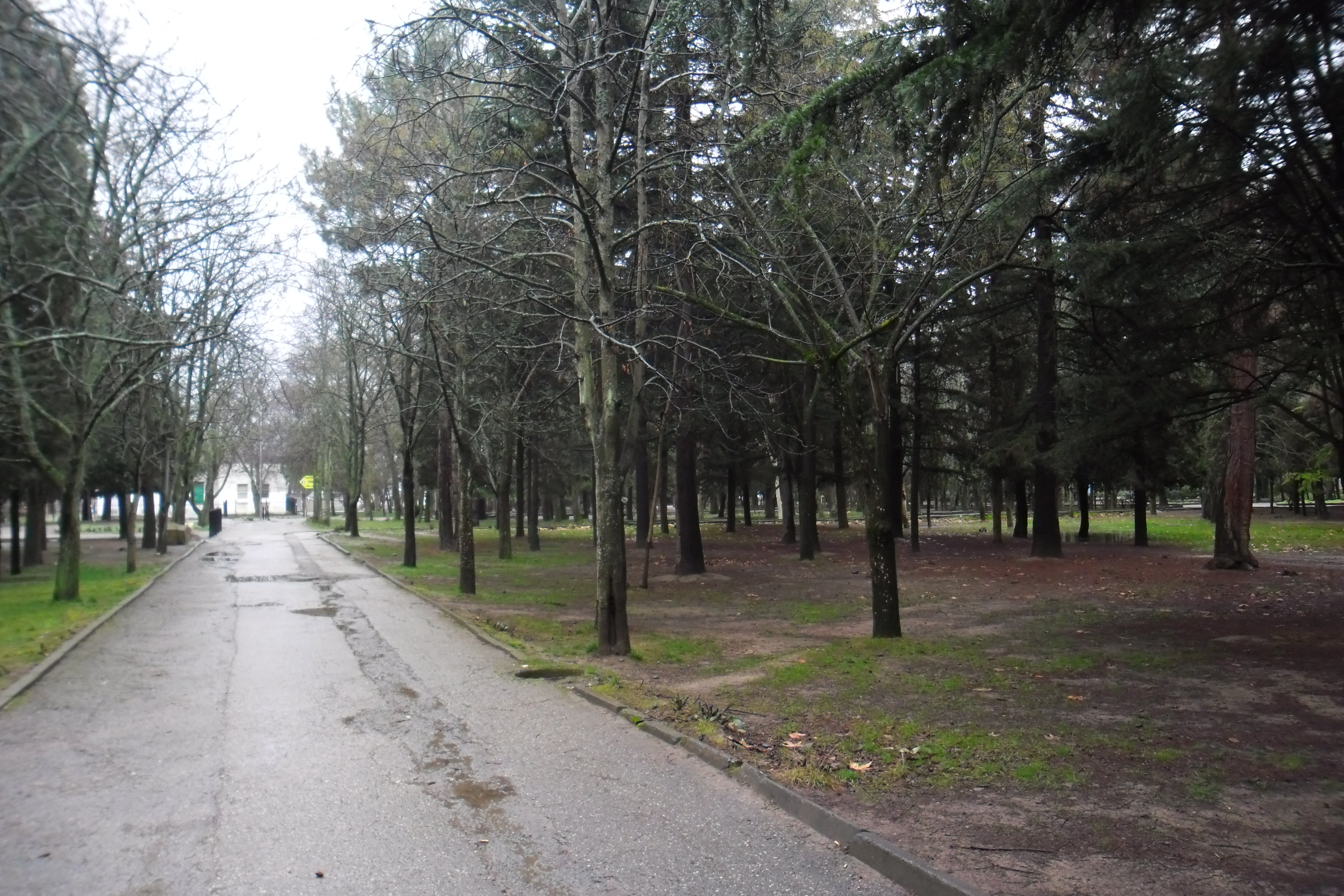
Park Alushti

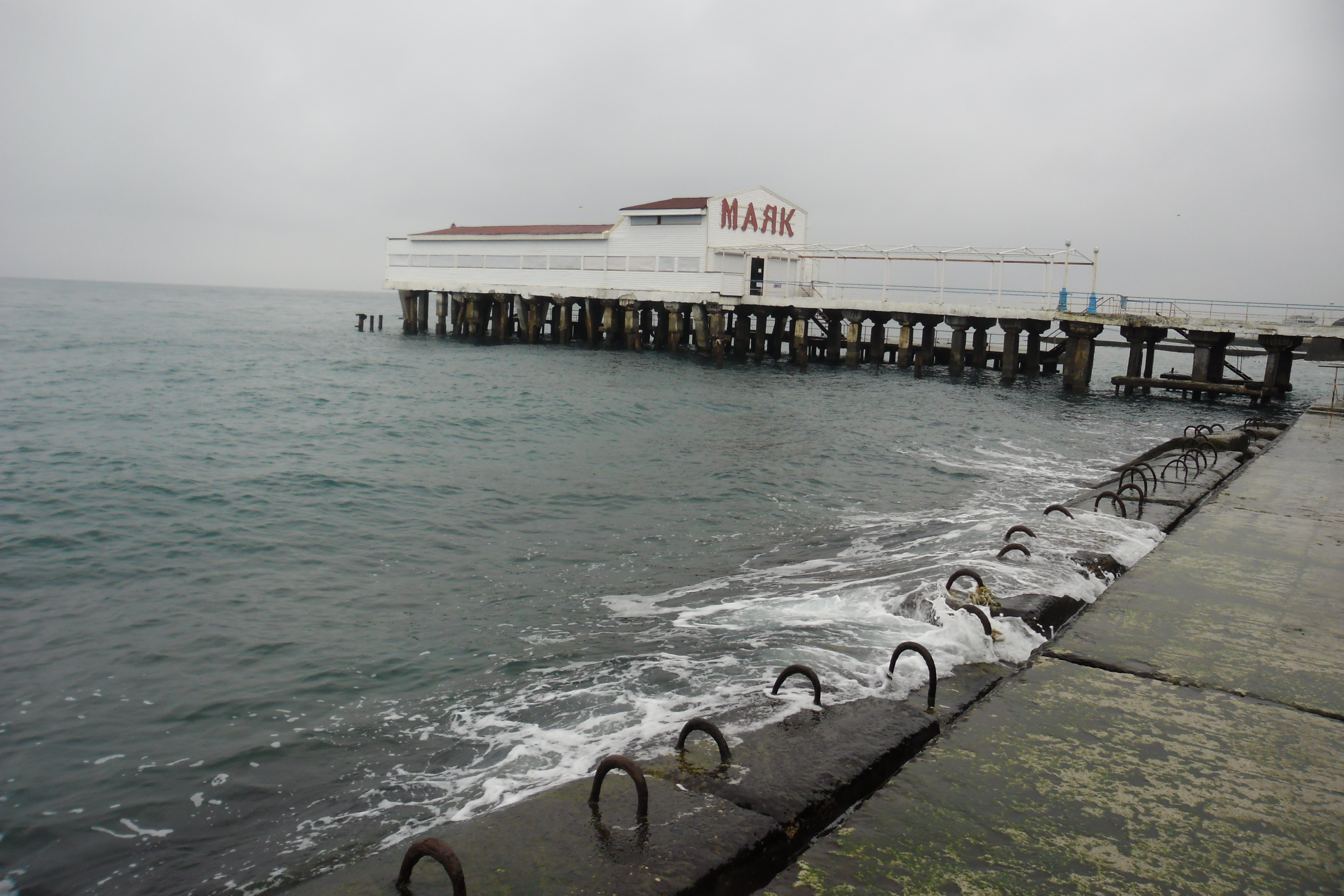
Alushta Beach

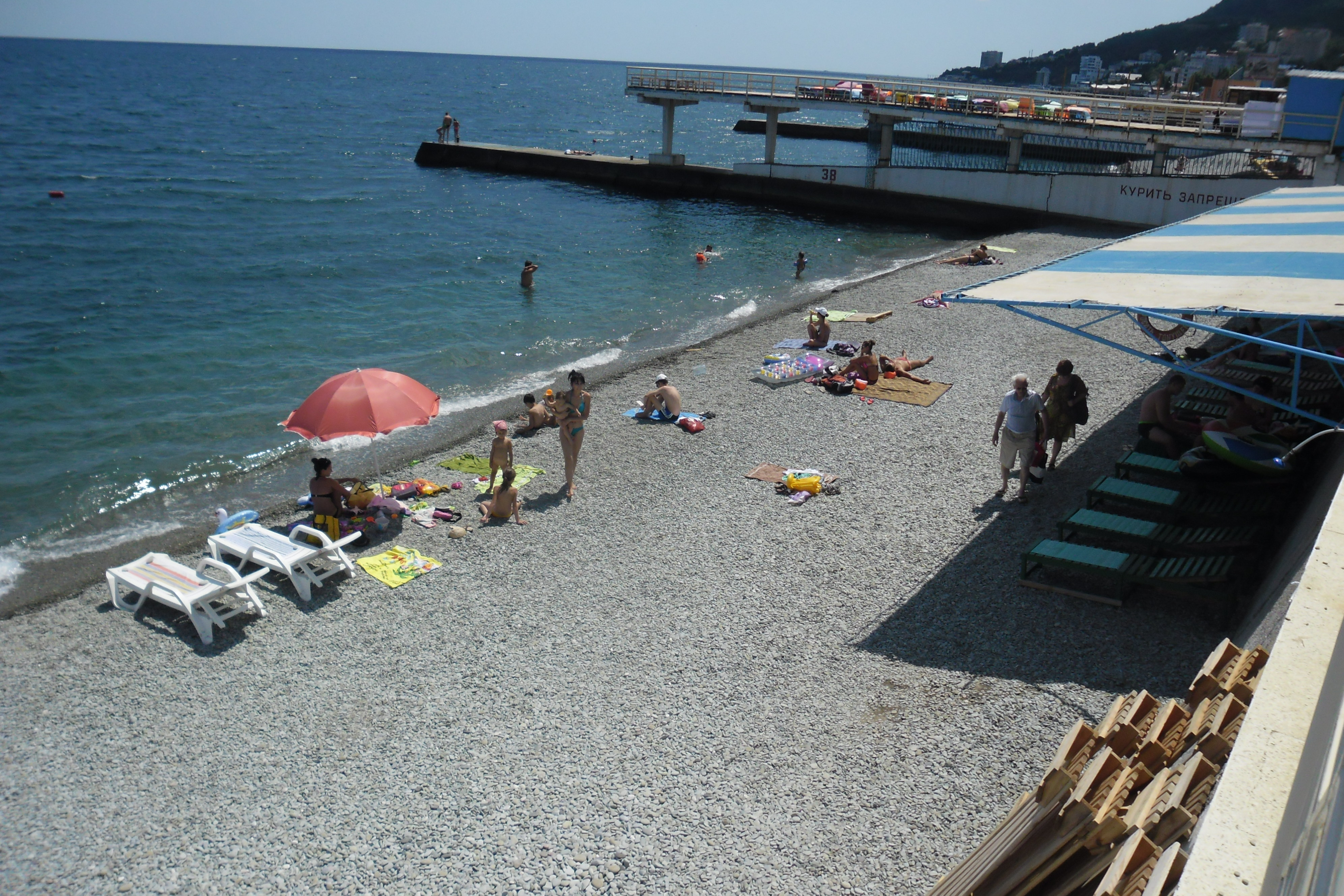
In Alushta. Season-2014

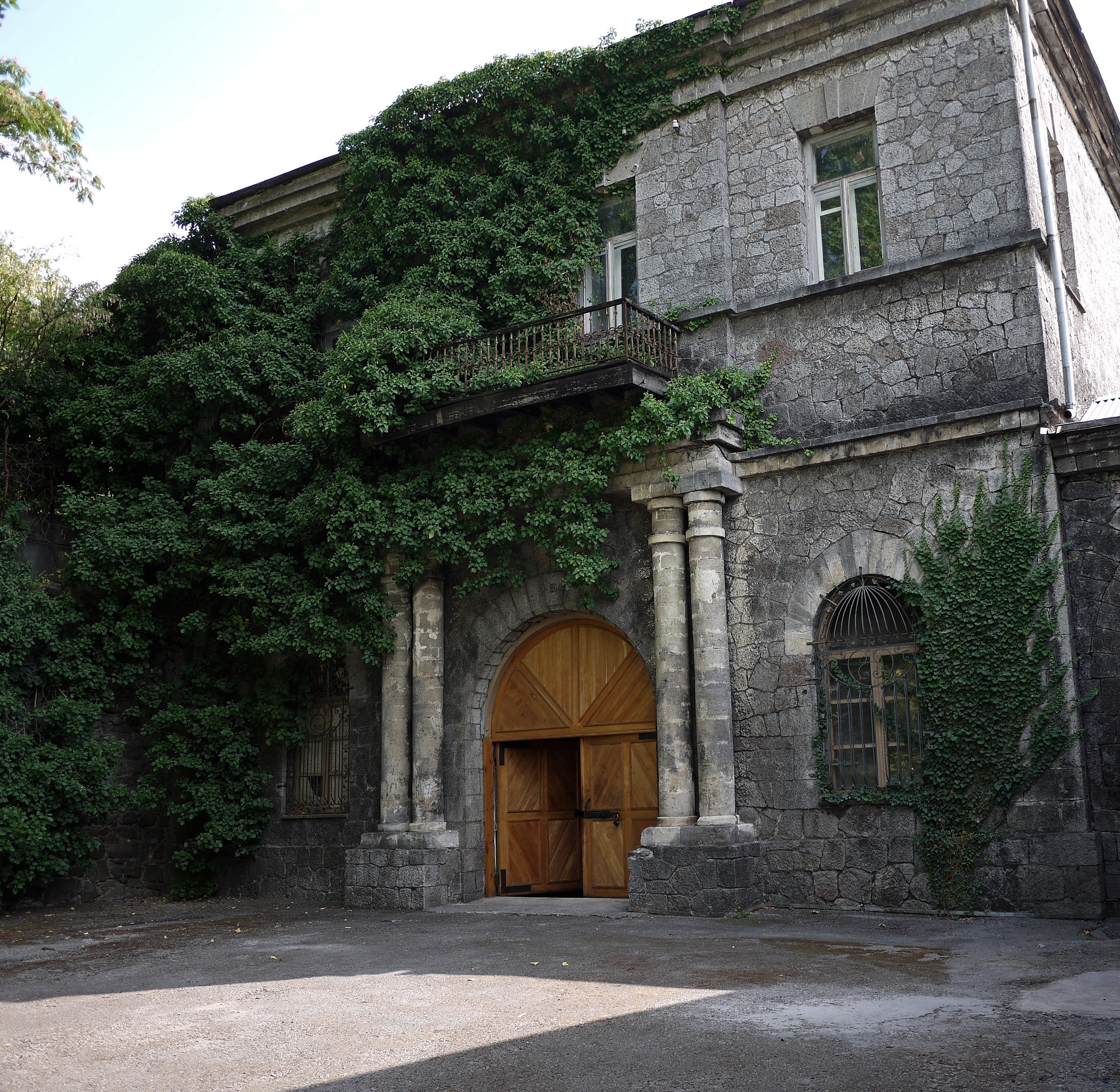
Alushta winery

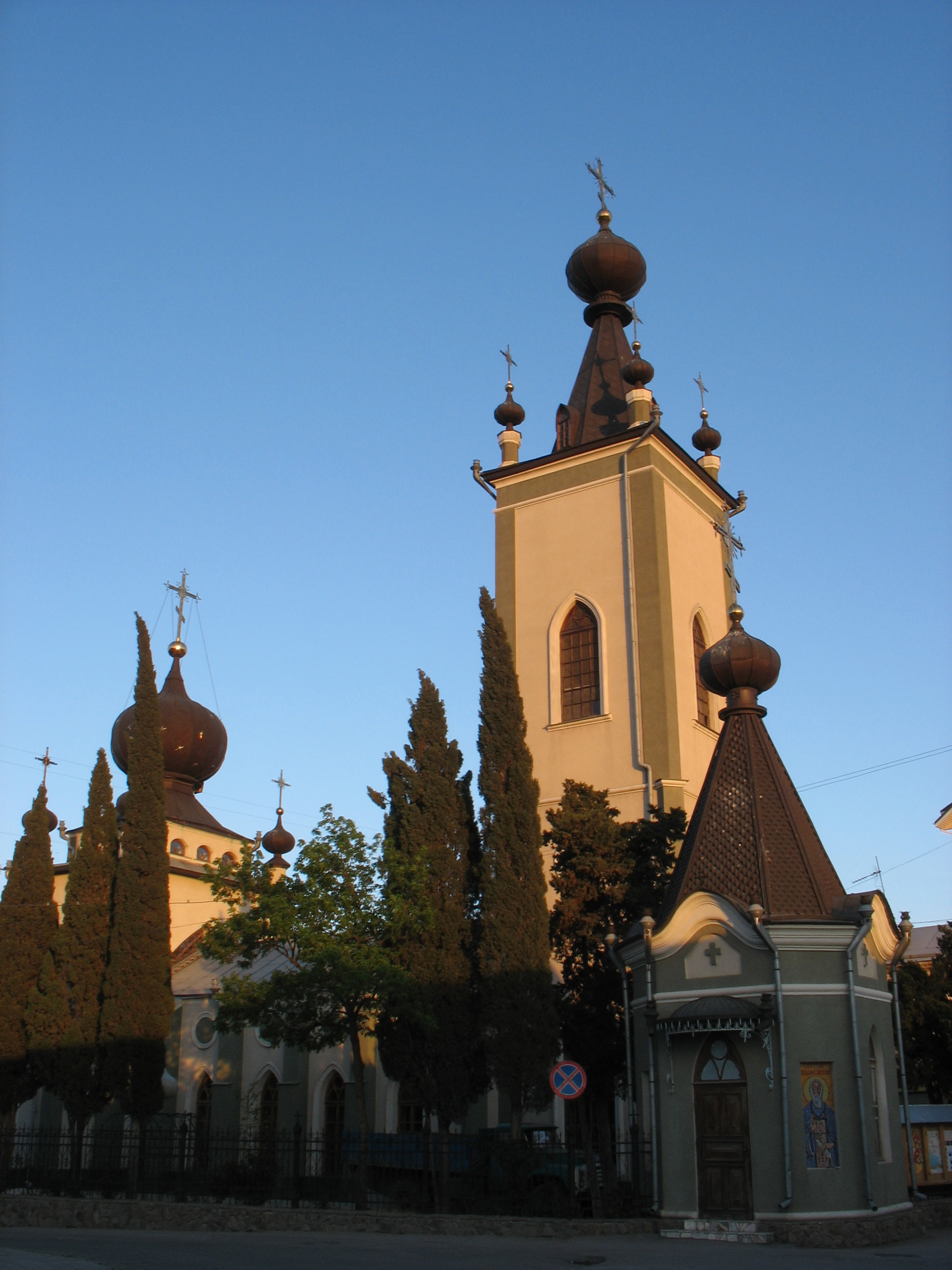
St. Theodore Church

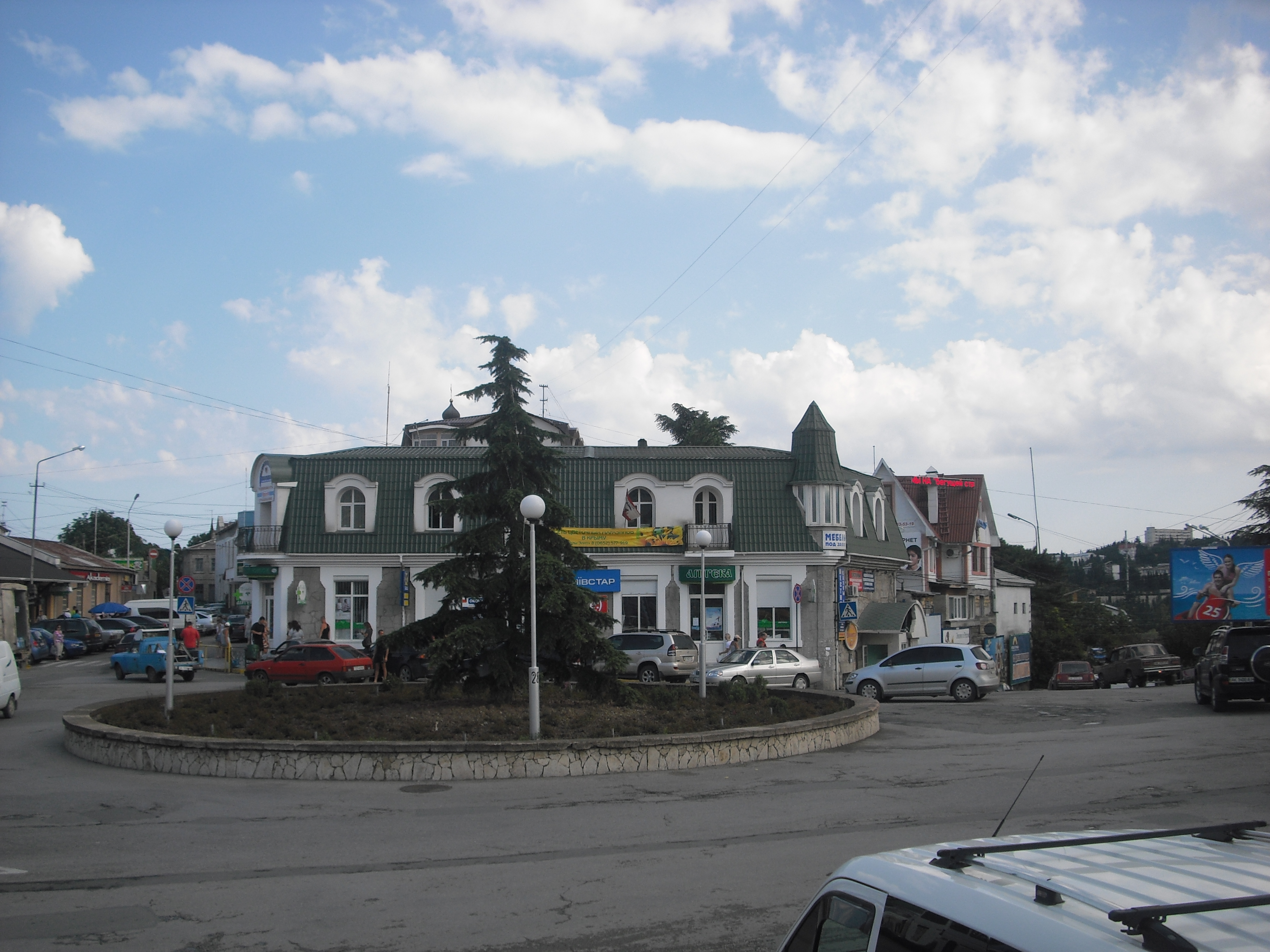
Main square

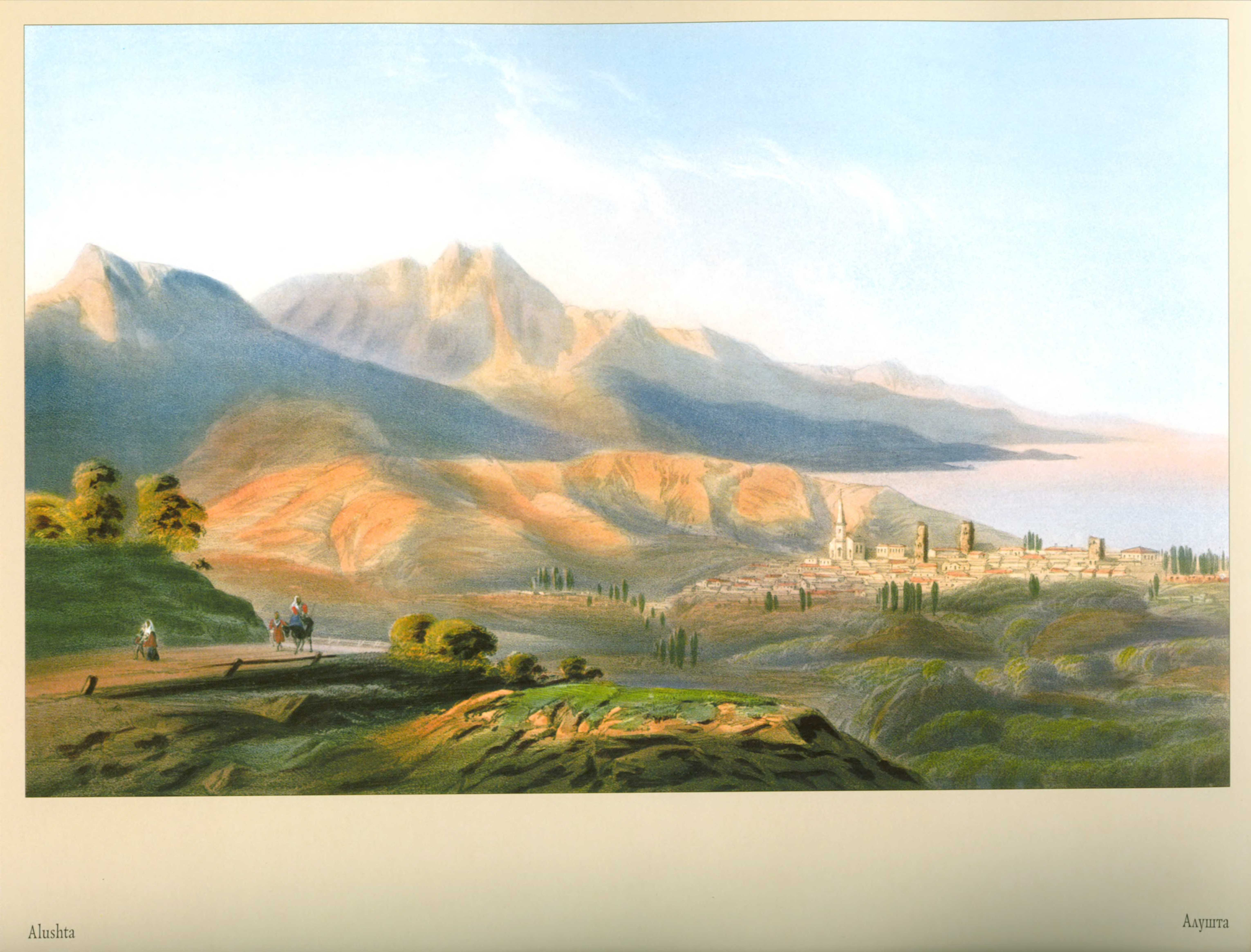
Panorama of Alushta in the 1850s, by Carlo Bossoli

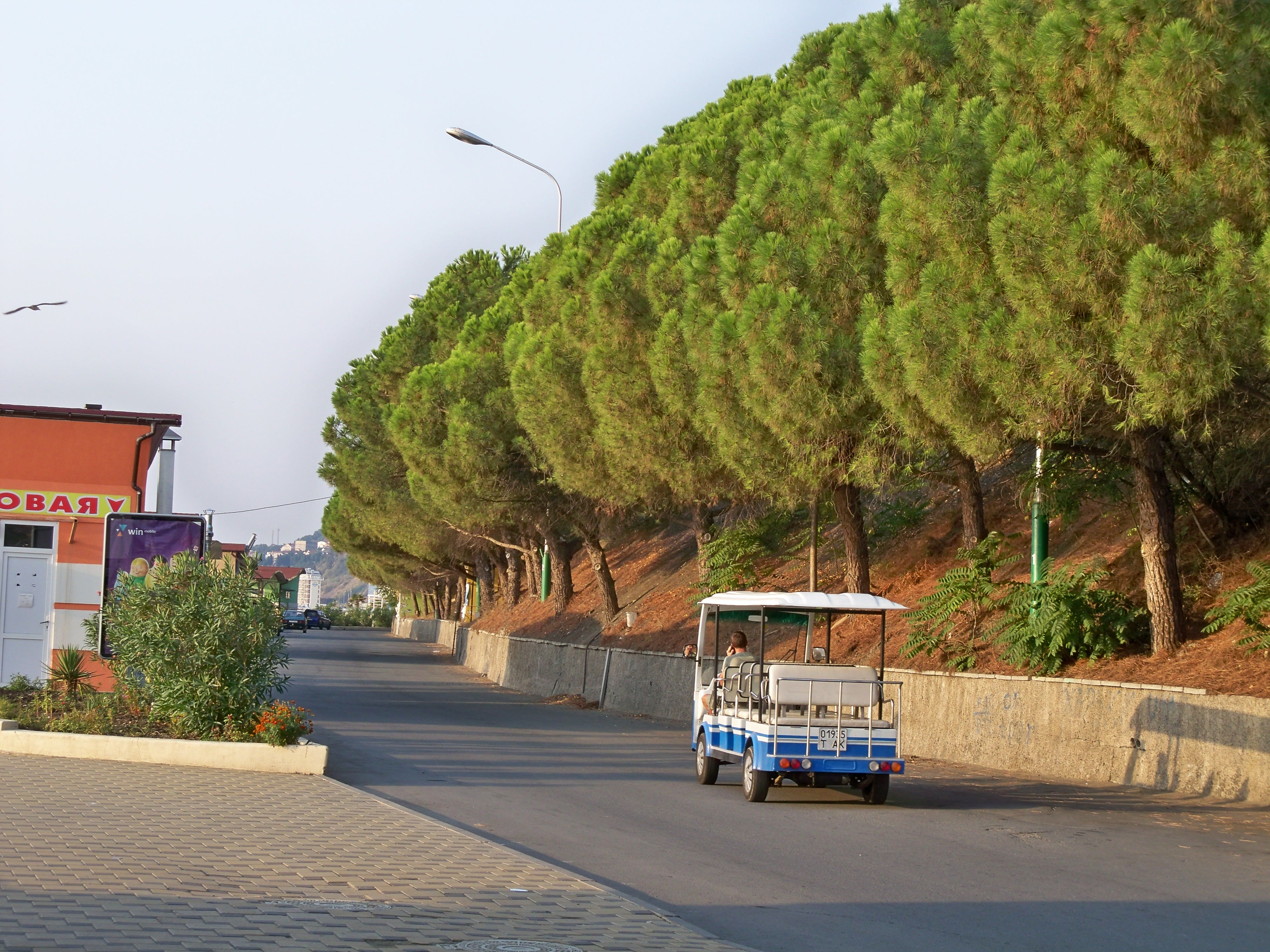
Quay

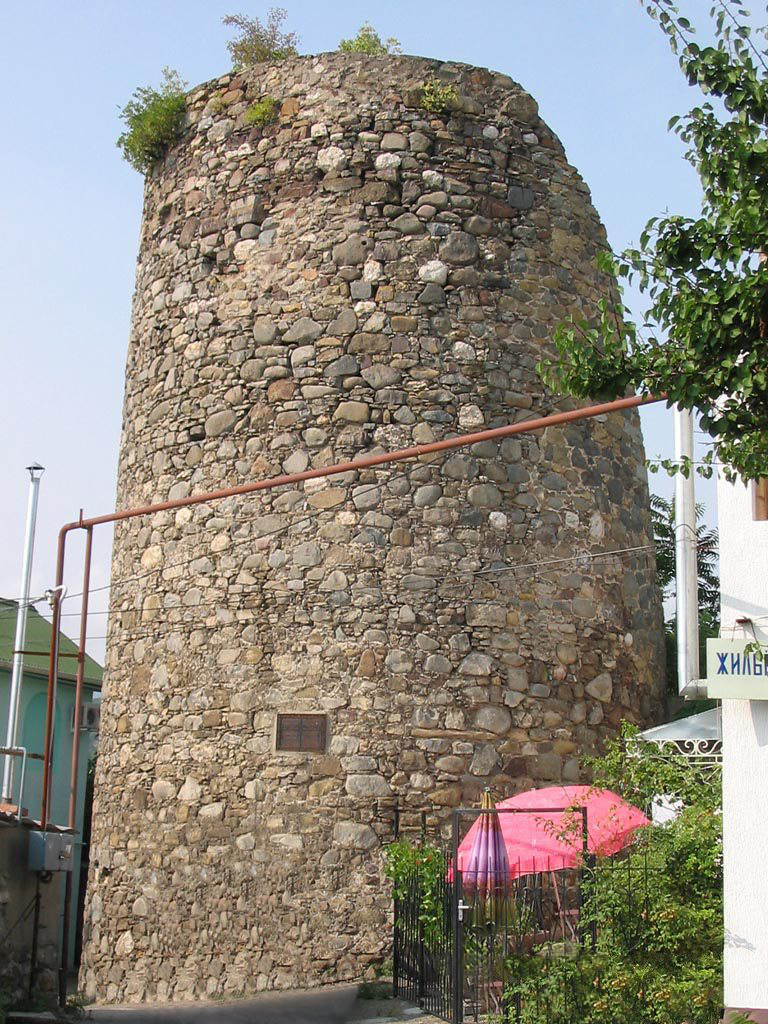
Remains of Aluston fortress

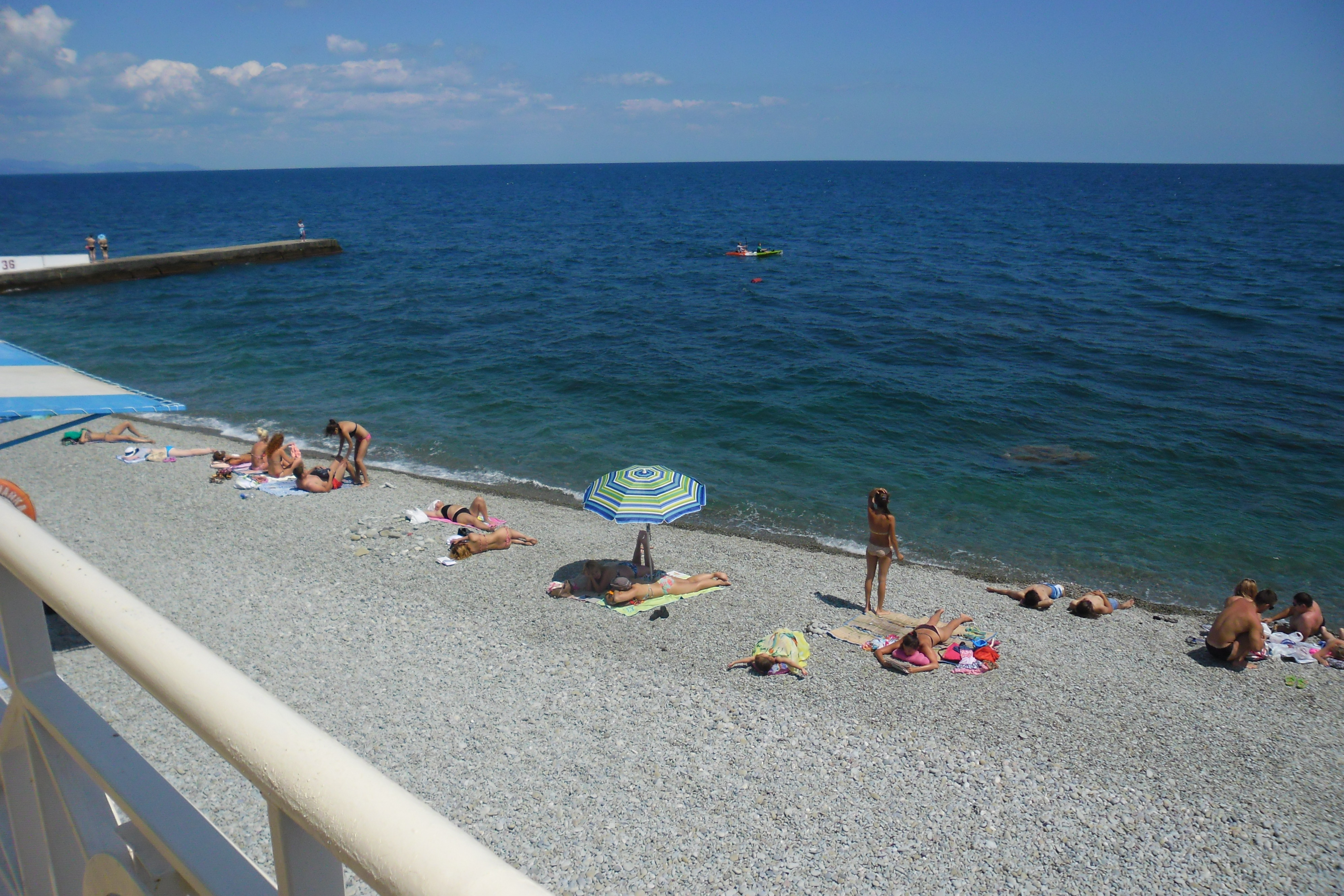
Alushta Beach. July 2014

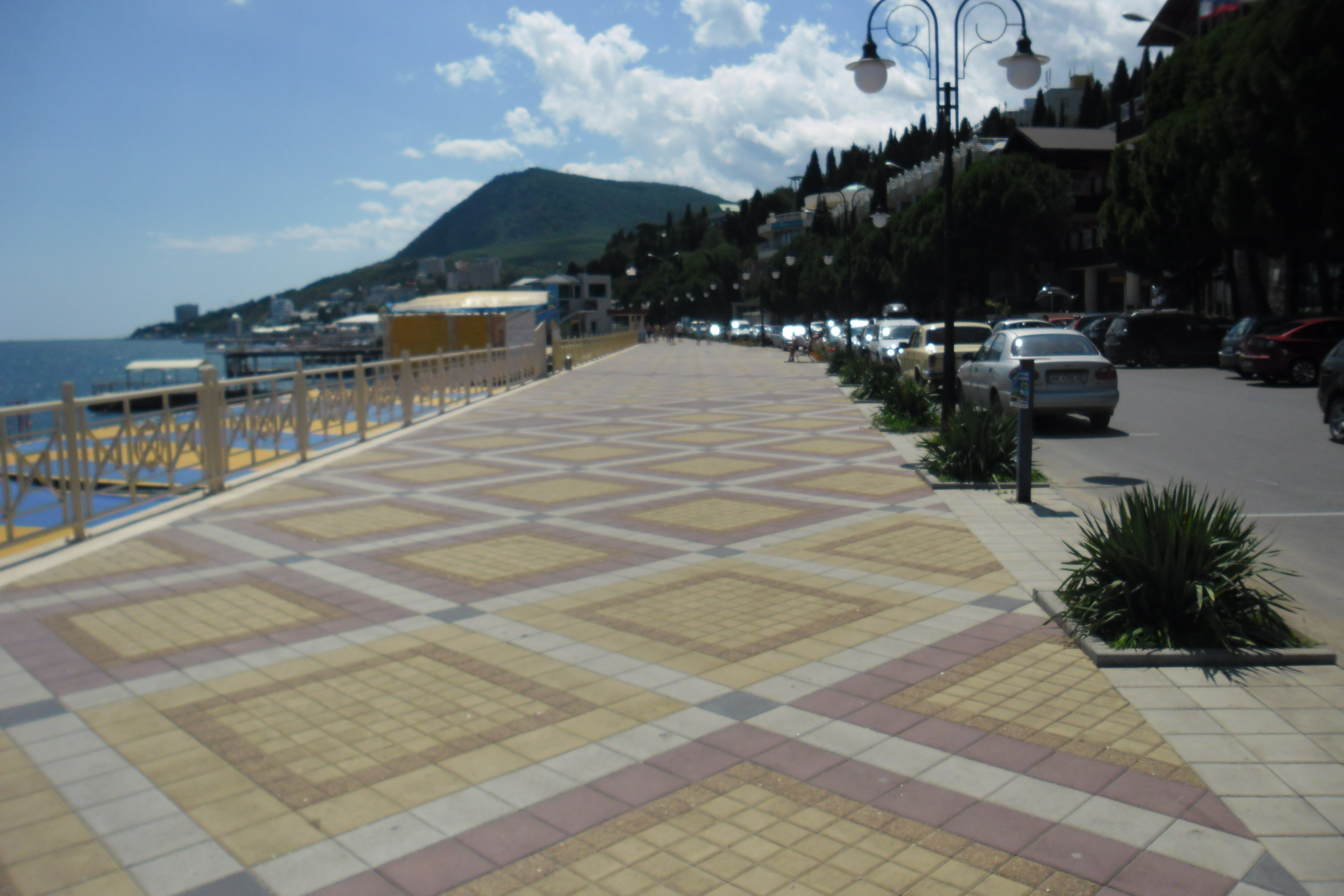
Quay. 2014

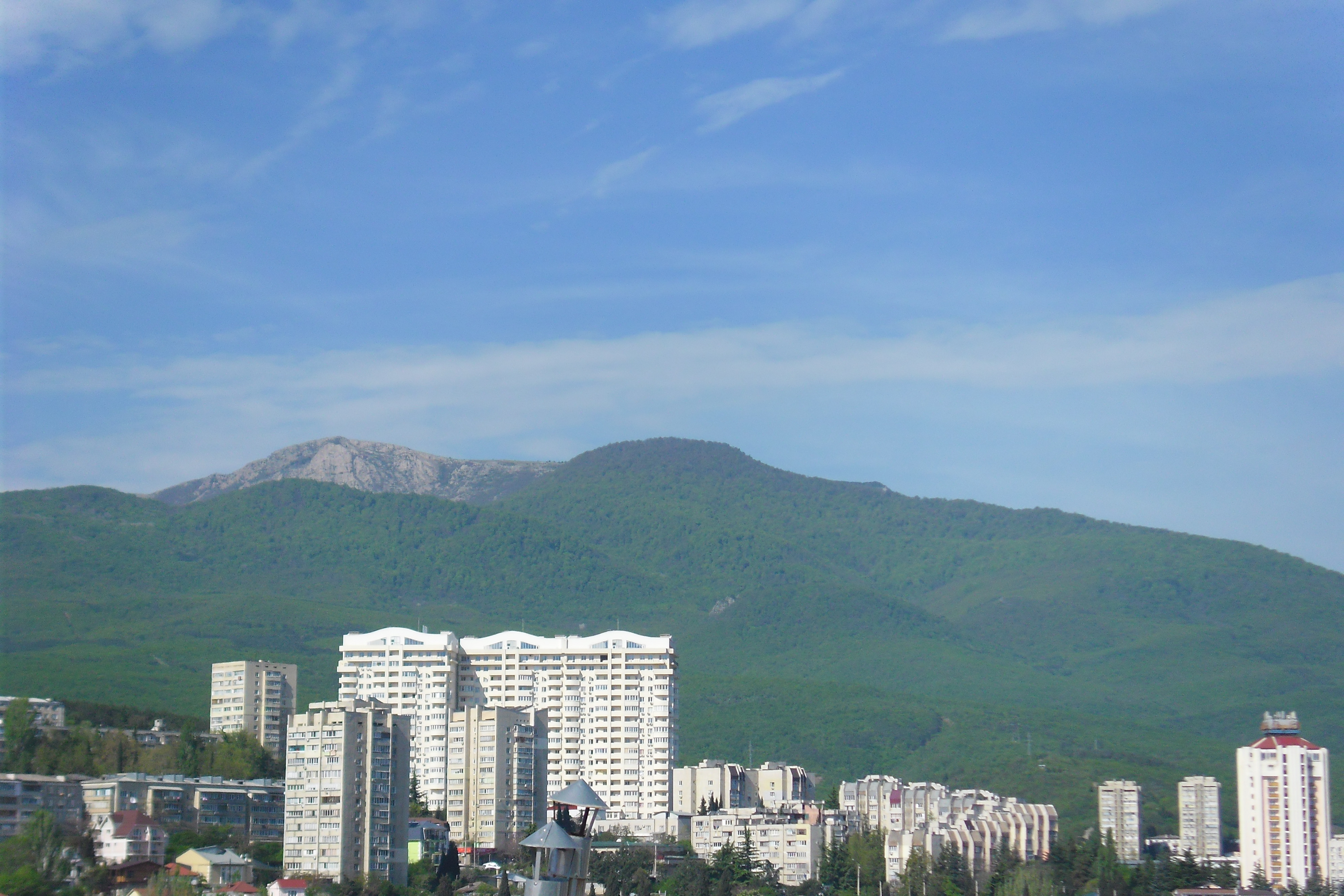
On the way. 2015

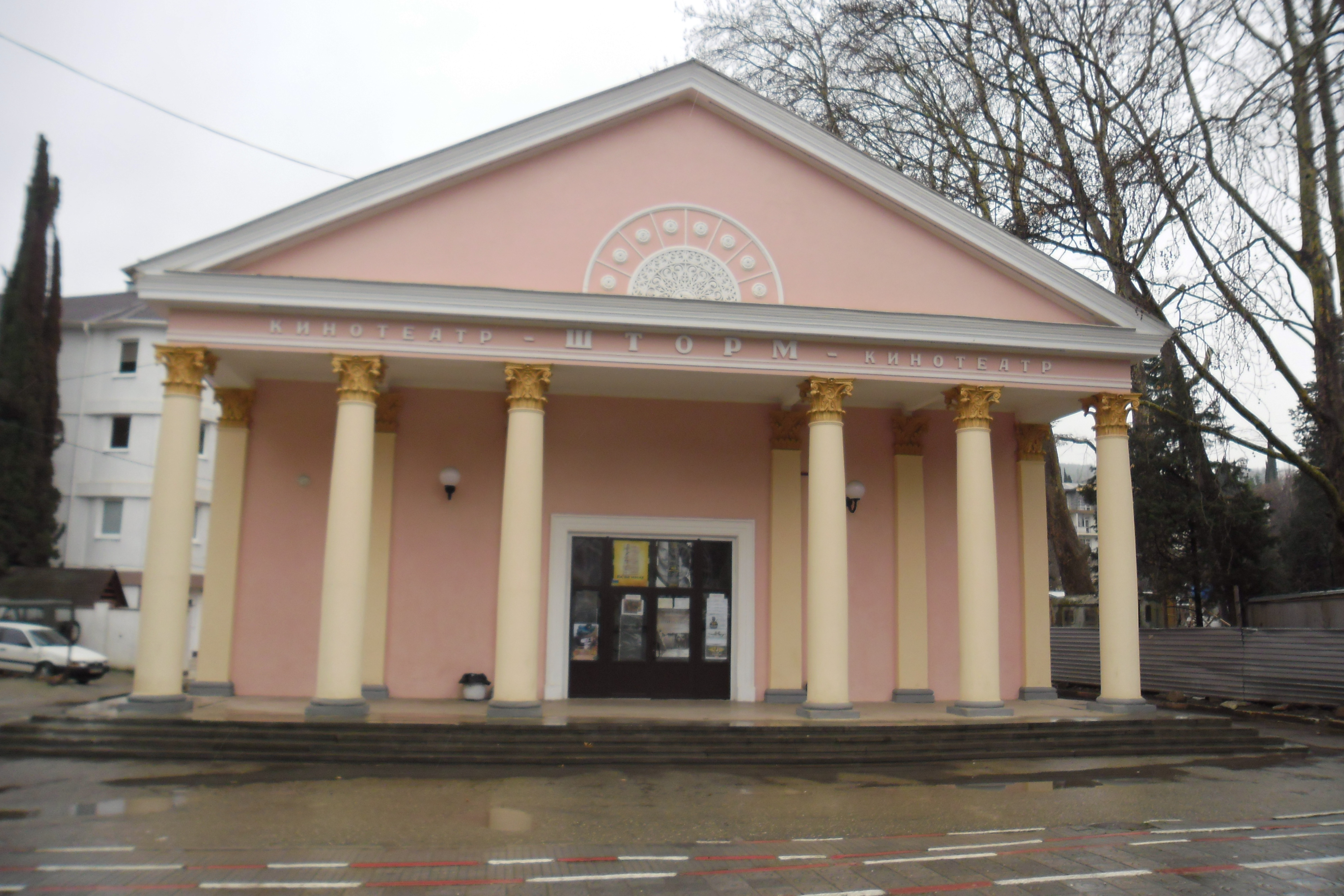
Cinema "Storm"

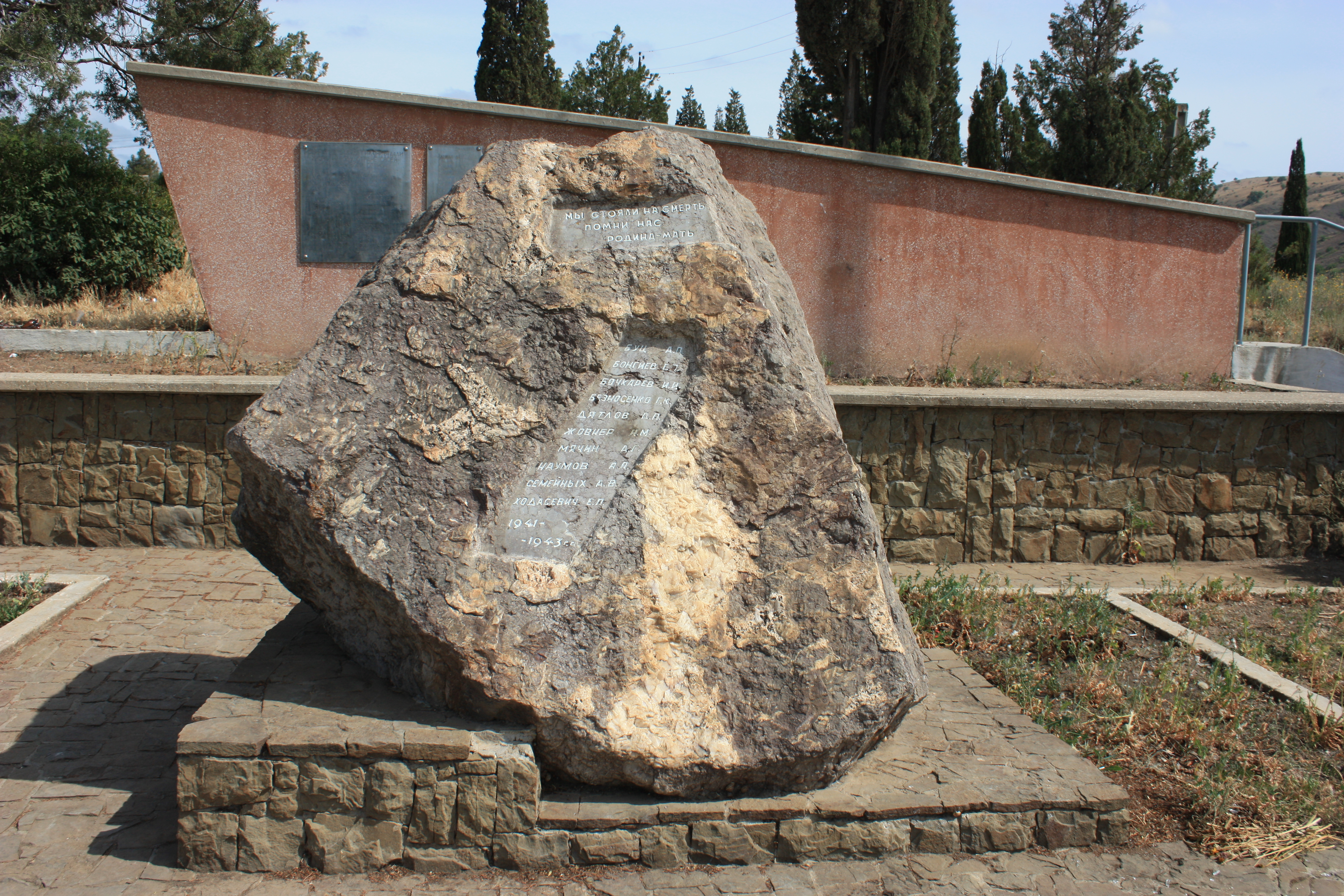
Memorial sign in honor of the Crimean partisans in Alushta

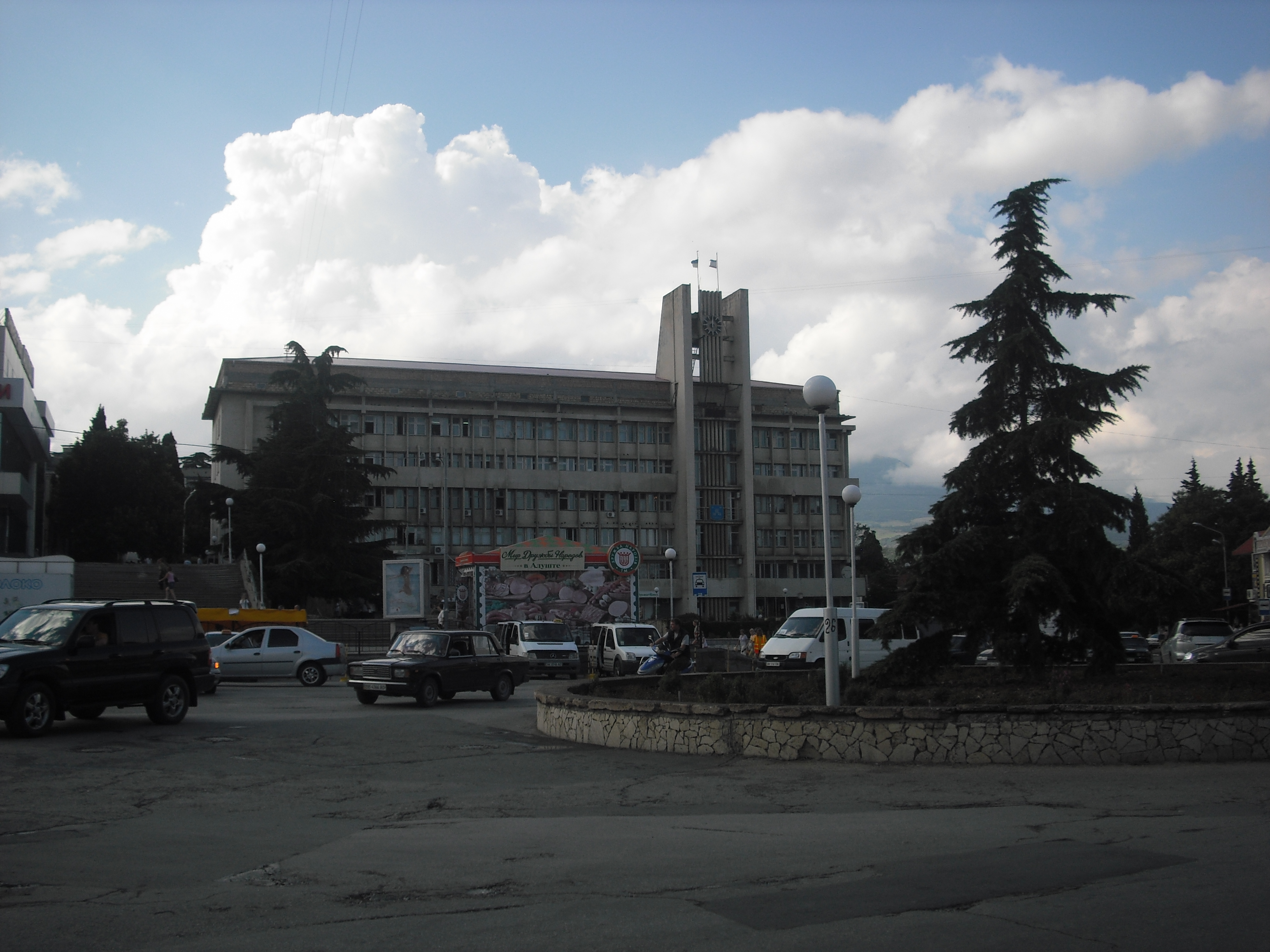
Alushta City Council building

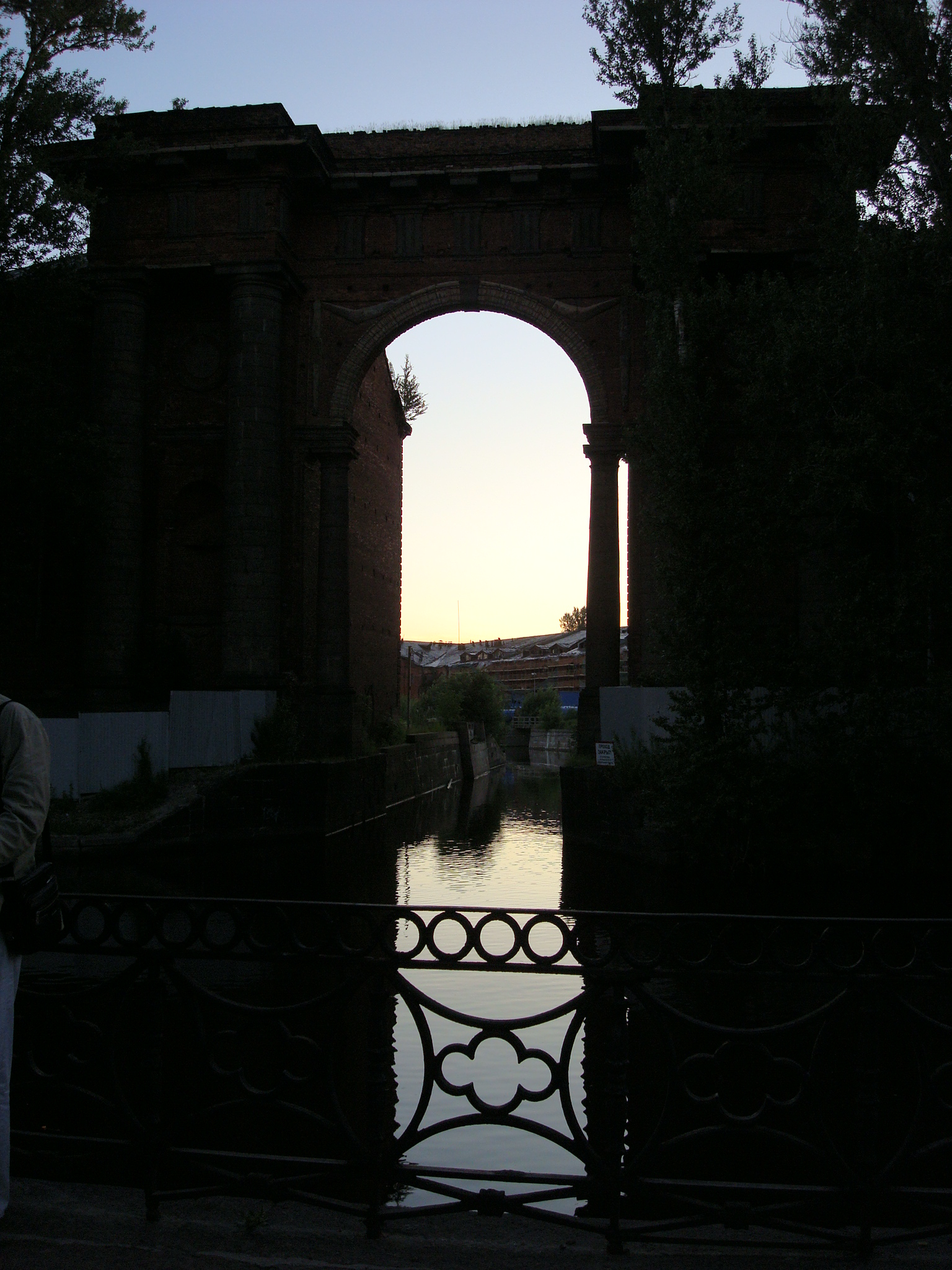
one of the symbols of Alushta

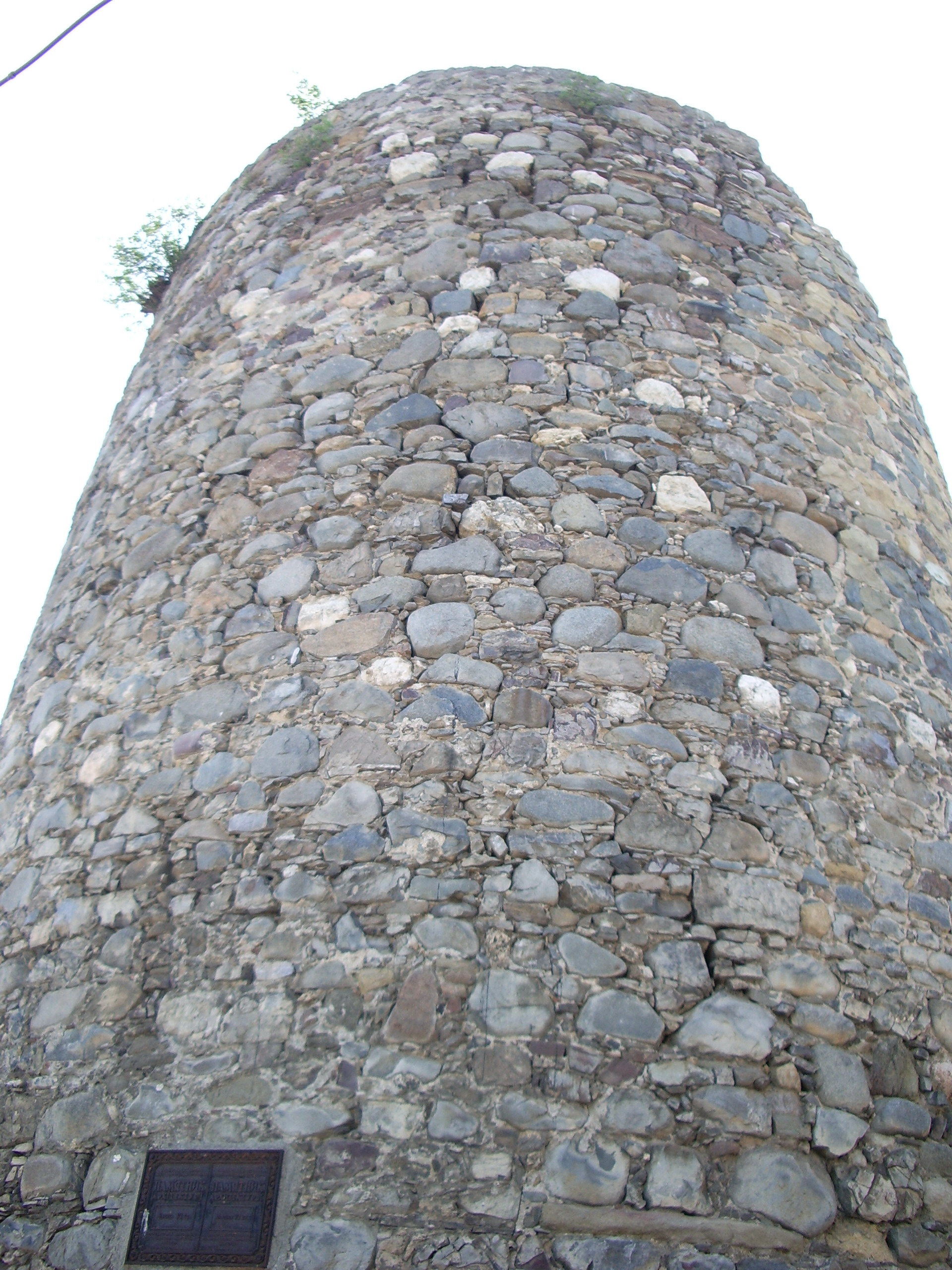
Aluston fortress (IV-VI centuries). In exchange. Crimea. June

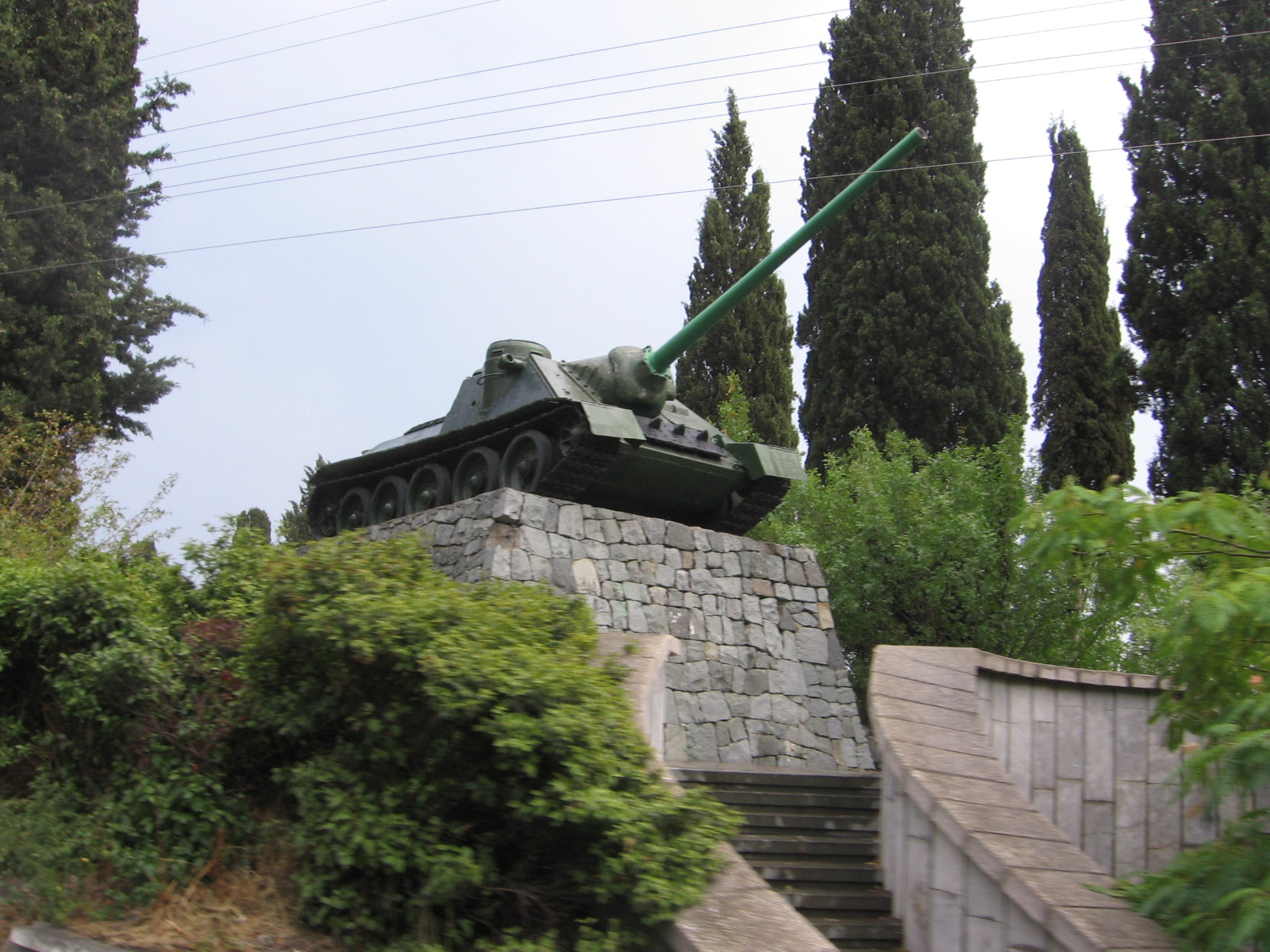
Soviet war monument in Alushta

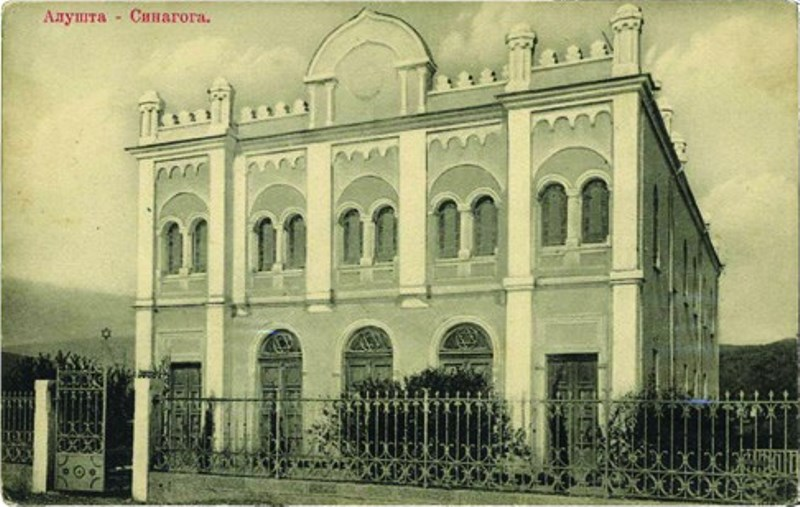
Kenesa in Alushta

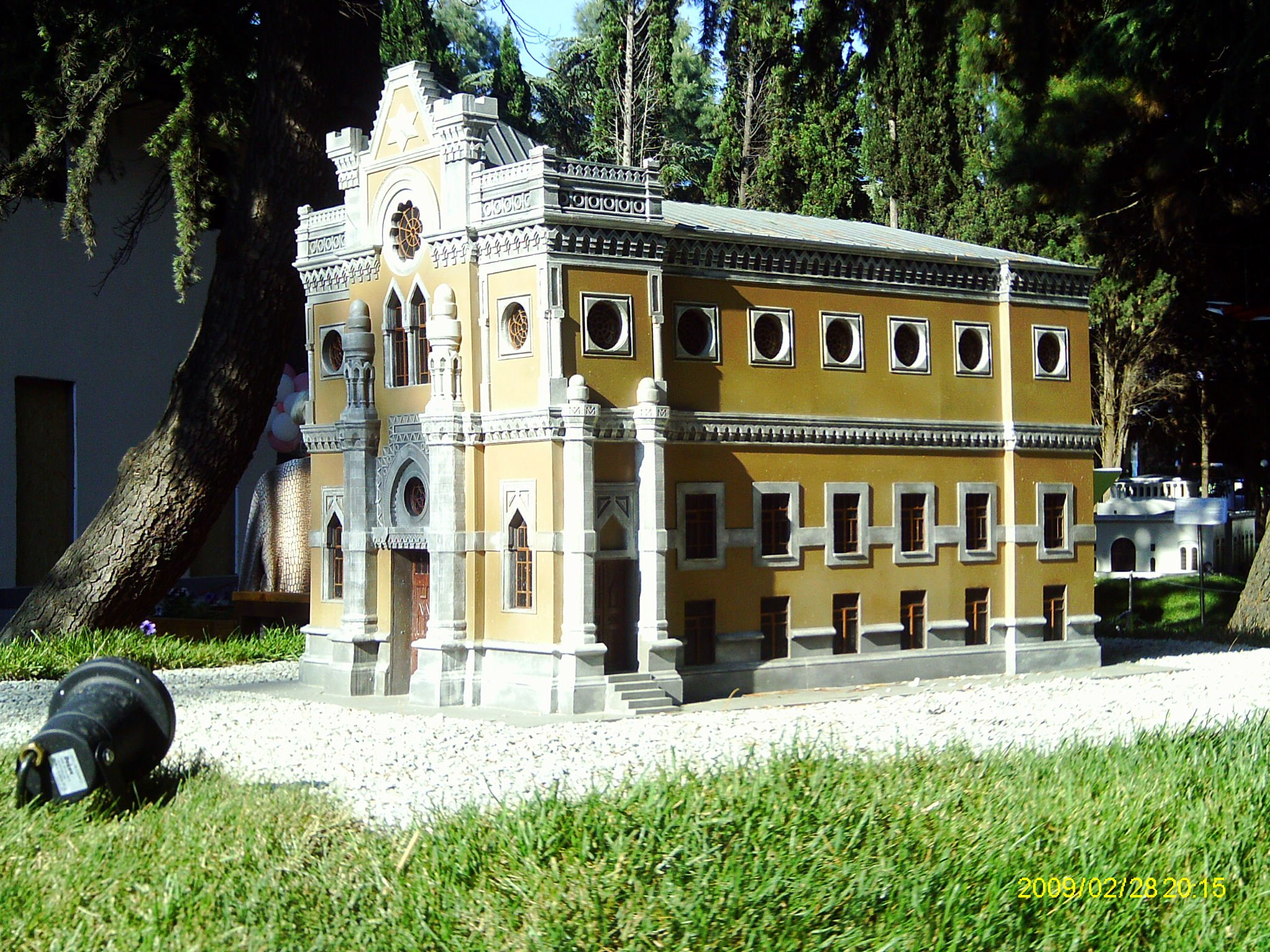
Kenesa in Alushta

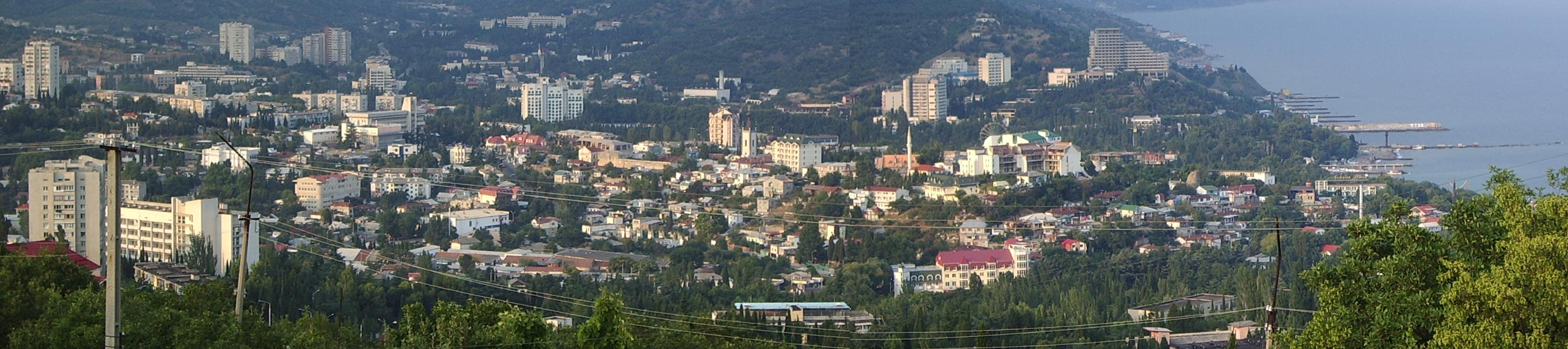
Panorama of the city
