= Srednyaya Akhtuba =

Srednyaya Akhtuba Средняя Ахтуба
- Urban-type settlement
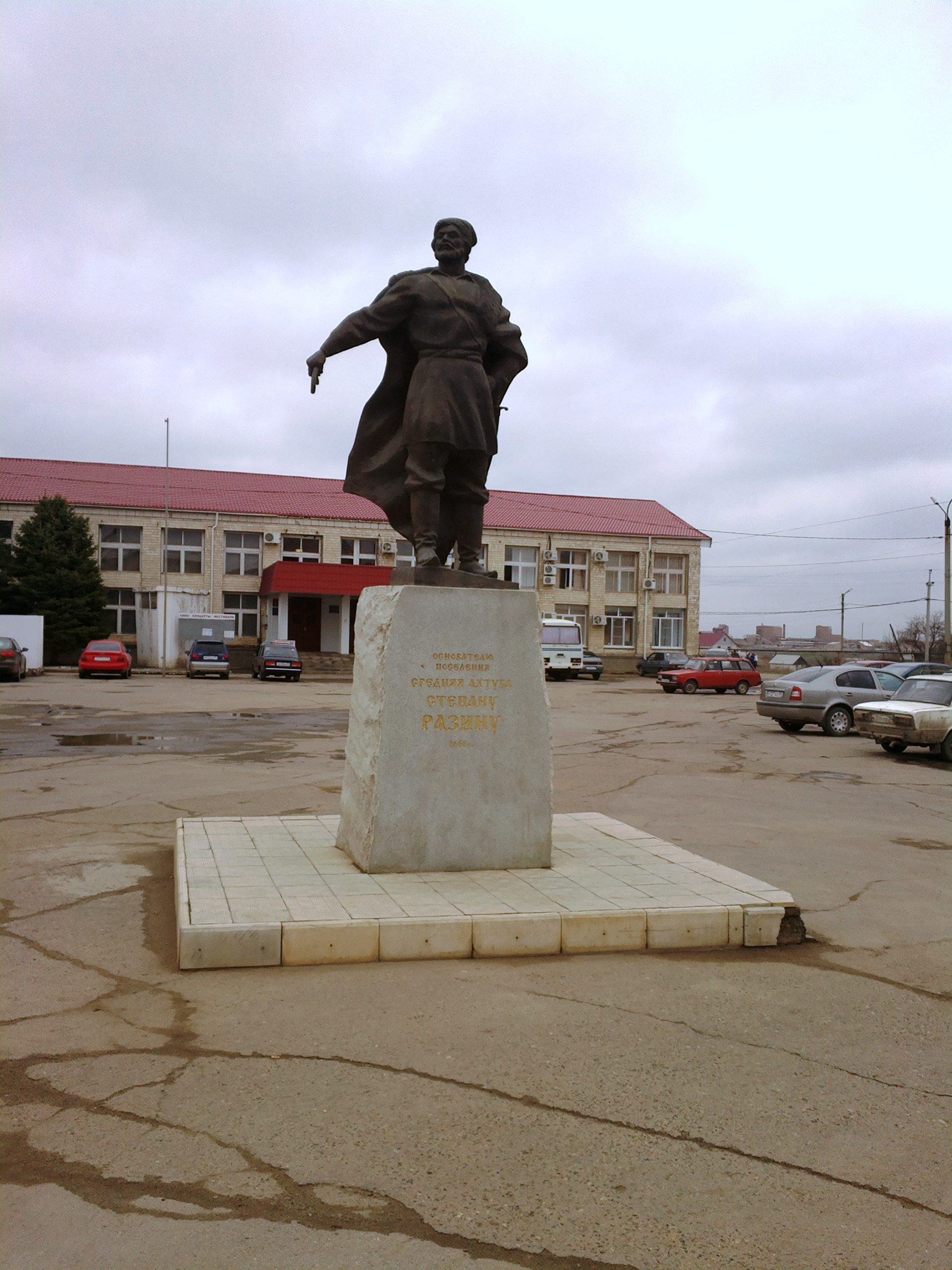
- Monument of Stenka Razin in Srednyaya Akhtuba

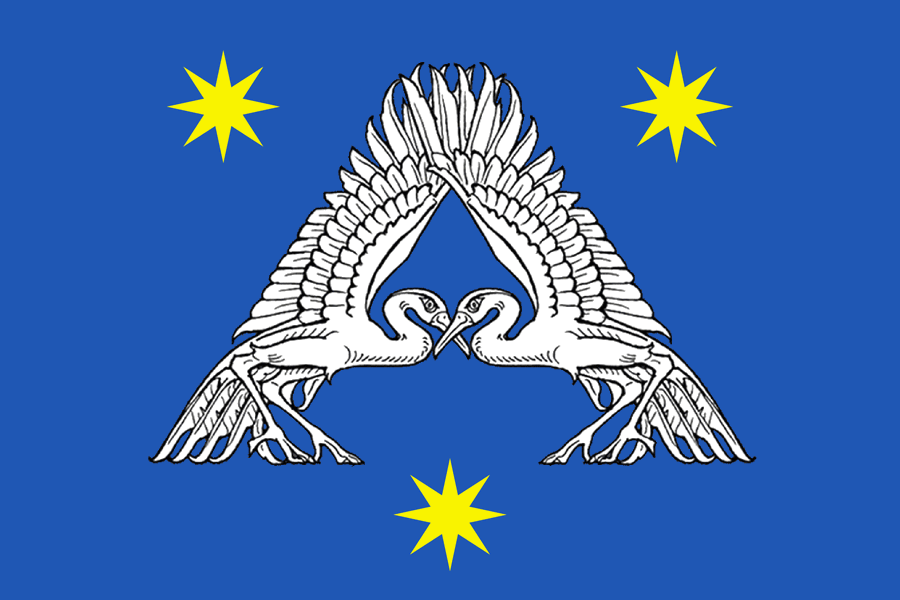
- Flag
- Interactive map of Srednyaya Akhtuba
- Location of Srednyaya Akhtuba Srednyaya Akhtuba (Volgograd Oblast)
- Coordinates: 48°43′N 44°52′E
- Country: Russia
- Federal subject: Volgograd Oblast
- Administrative district: Sredneakhtubinsky District
- Founded: 1668

Population (2010 Census)
  - Total: 14,431
  - Estimate (1 January 2024): 14,293 (−1%)
- Time zone: UTC+3 (MSK)
- Postal code: 404143
- OKTMO ID: 18651151051

Srednyaya Akhtuba (Russian: Сре́дняя Ахту́ба) is an urban locality (a work settlement) and the administrative center of Sredneakhtubinsky District of Volgograd Oblast, Russia. Population: 14,431 (2010 census); 13,856 (2002 census); 11,445 (1989 Soviet census).
