= Sredneakhtubinsky District =

Sredneakhtubinsky District Среднеахтубинский район (Russian)
- District
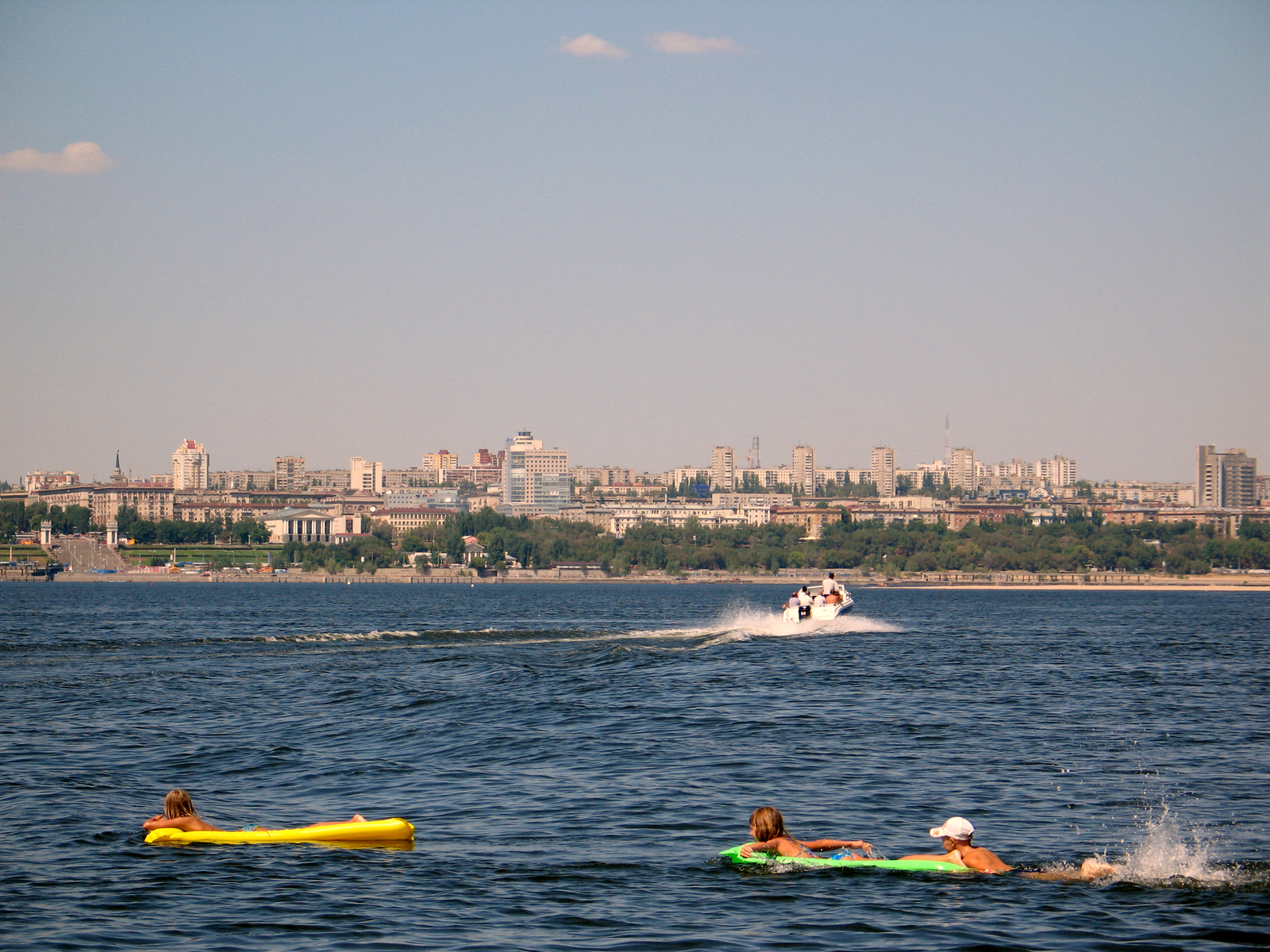
- On the Volga River, Sredneakhtubinsky District

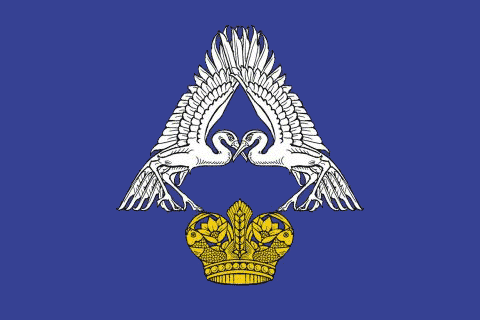
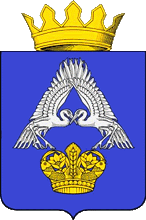
- Flag Coat of arms
- Location of Sredneakhtubinsky District in Volgograd Oblast
- Coordinates: 48°43′N 44°52′E
- Country: Russia
- Federal subject: Volgograd Oblast
- Established: 23 June 1928
- Administrative center: Srednyaya Akhtuba

Area
  - Total: 2,039 km^{2} (787 sq mi)

Population (2010 Census)
  - Total: 58,962
  - Density: 28.92/km^{2} (74.89/sq mi)
  - Urban: 51.6%
  - Rural: 48.4%

Administrative structure
  - Administrative divisions: 1 Towns of district significance, 1 Urban-type settlements, 9 Selsoviets
  - Inhabited localities: 1 cities/towns, 1 urban-type settlements, 59 rural localities

Municipal structure
  - Municipally incorporated as: Sredneakhtubinsky Municipal District
  - Municipal divisions: 2 urban settlements, 10 rural settlements
- Time zone: UTC+3 (MSK)
- OKTMO ID: 18651000
- Website: volganet.ru

Sredneakhtubinsky District (Russian: Среднеахту́бинский райо́н) is an administrative district (raion), one of the thirty-three in Volgograd Oblast, Russia. As a municipal division, it is incorporated as Sredneakhtubinsky Municipal District. It is located in the southeast of the oblast. The area of the district is 2,039 square kilometers (787 sq mi). Its administrative center is the urban locality (a work settlement) of Srednyaya Akhtuba. Population: 58,962 (2010 census); 55,341 (2002 Census); 48,555 (1989 Soviet census). The population of Srednyaya Akhtuba accounts for 24.5% of the district's total population.

== Administrative and municipal divisions ==
As an administrative division, the district is divided into one town of district significance (Krasnoslobodsk), one urban-type settlement (Srednyaya Akhtuba), and nine selsoviets. As a municipal division, the district is incorporated as Sredneakhtubinsky Municipal District and is divided into two urban and ten rural settlements. Until April 2012, the municipal district included all of the inhabited localities of the administrative district, with the exception of one rural locality (the settlement of Uralsky), which was municipally a part of Volzhsky Urban Okrug. In April 2012, the settlement of Uralsky was merged into the city of Volzhsky.
