= All Right! =

1927 poem by Vladimir Majakovski

- Author: Vladimir Mayakovsky
- Original title: Хорошо!
- Language: Russian
- Publisher: Gosizdat
- Publication date: 1927
- Publication place: USSR
- Media type: Print (hardback & paperback)

All Right! (also: Good!, Russian: Хорошо!) is a poem by Vladimir Mayakovsky written for the tenth anniversary of the 1917 Revolution. Started in December 1926 and completed in August 1927, it was published in October 1927 by GIZ Publishers. Prior to that, Mayakovsky recited the poem at many public performances, and parts of it were published by numerous Soviet newspapers throughout the year.

"For me All Right! is a manifesto kind of thing, in the way that A Cloud in Trousers has been, for its time. [It incorporates] less abstract poetic tricks (hyperbole, self-important vignettes), and more of the new, freshly invented ways of processing historical and agitative material", he wrote in the autobiography I, Myself.
