= Vladimir Ilyich Lenin (poem) =

1925 poem by Vladimir Mayakovsky

- Author: Vladimir Mayakovsky
- Original title: Владимир Ильич Ленин
- Language: Russian
- Genre: Poem
- Publication date: 1924
- Publication place: Soviet Union
- Media type: Print (hardback and paperback)

Vladimir Ilyich Lenin (Russian: Владимир Ильич Ленин) is an epic poem by Vladimir Mayakovsky written in 1923–1924. The first fragments of it appeared in October 1924 in numerous Soviet newspapers, and it came out as a separate edition in February 1925 by Leningrad's Gosizdat.

== Background ==
Mayakovsky's four-poem Lenin Cycle started in April 1920 with "Vladimir Ilyich!" published in the days when Vladimir Lenin's 50th birthday was celebrated all over the country. Then in 1923 came "We Do Not Believe!" (Мы не верим!), written in the wake of the news of Lenin's fatal illness. It was at that time that the idea of an epic poem on the Russian revolutionary leader was born. In the early 1924, soon after Lenin's death the poem called "The Komsomol Song" (Комсомольская) was published in Molodaya Gvardiya (Nos. 2 and 3), featuring the soon to become omnipresent refrain: "Lenin lived, Lenin lives, Lenin is to live forever." All three were later included into the 22-poem Revolution cycle.

On 22 January Mayakovsky attended the meeting of the XI All-Russian Congress of Soviets where Mikhail Kalinin informed the delegates of Lenin's death on 21 January, at 18:30. On 27 January he was present at Lenin's funeral at the Red Square. Both events have made a profound impression upon the poet. Mayakovsky's elder sister Lyudmila remembered: "Volodya took Lenin's death very personally. For him it was like the loss of a dear, close person. He believed in him. He loved him from those early days of working in the revolutionary underground. So shaken was he by this death that for some time couldn't find it in him to express his feelings [in writing]… [Mayakovsky] has been coming back to Lenin's memory and ideas throughout his life. Because it was Lenin's struggle for the shining ideals of Communism, that Vladimir considered his own life's meaning."

== History ==
Mayakovsky started working upon the poem called originally just "Lenin" soon after the funeral, then took a break. The work resumed in April 1925 and continued until September. In the first days of October the work was finished. On October 3 Mayakovsky signed the publishing contract with Gosizdat. On October 20 the publishers received the manuscript. Prior to that there's been no press reports on the author's work on his poem, or any publications of its fragments. The first to mention it was Zhizn Iskusstva (Life of Art). "Mayakovsky has just completed a large poem about Lenin. In terms of grandiosity it supersedes by far everything that he'd written before," this magazine's No.43, 1924 issue informed its readers. In mid-October fragments of the poem appeared in Rabochaya Moskva, Vechernyaya Moskva, several provincial newspapers. There were performances with the recitals at the Moscow's Press House (October 18) and The Red Hall of the Moscow Communist Party headquarters on October 21, with the audience of the Party activists.

At the Press House event the majority of the audience were the provincial journalists who came from all over the country to attend a congress. Author and critic Kornely Zelinsky in his 1955 memoirs remembered:

The middle section of the poem, portraying Lenin against the backdrop of the international workers' movement was being received with some strain, some asked Mayakovsky to read slower... The poem's last words drowned in rapturous, heartfelt applause. Mayakovsky walked off to a table and, hands still trembling, started sorting out notes. One particular piece of paper apparently touched him most, and he said, his voice booming: "Here's one comrade wants to know, why would I have to write this polit'education verse. For those who are politically uneducated, such would be my answer." Outraged, some people in the audience burst out: "Now, isn't it rude, to ask such questions?" But Mayakovsky waved those protestations aside and told his agitated supporters that the question was quite legitimate. And that while working upon the poem he was fully aware of this danger of falling into the trap of flat political journalism. "My approach to this poem was that of a poet. And that was difficult to maintain, comrades," he added in a confessional tone.

The Red Hall concert was reviewed on the 23 October issue of Rabochaya Moskva (The Working Moscow) newspaper. The article titled "The poem Vladimir Ilyich Lenin, as Judged by the Party Activists," read:

The Hall was overcrowded. The poem received massive ovation. As the discussion started, some of the speakers opined that what they've just heard was the strongest piece ever written on Lenin. The great majority agreed that the poem was totally 'ours', that Mayakovsky has done the proletarian cause a huge service. After the dispute, Mayakovsky answered his opponents' questions. He said, in particular, that his general intention was to present the powerful figure of Lenin against the background of the revolutionary history as a whole."

In his I, Myself autobiography (Chapter "1924") Mayakovsky wrote: "Lenin's completed. Recited [the poem] at the numerous workers' meetings. Had misgivings as regards this poem, for it was easy here to resort to the mere political narrative. But the workers' response gave me encouragement, made me confident the poem was indeed relevant."

In October Mayakovsky also read the poem at some private meetings, notably in Valerian Kuybyshev's Kremlin office, and at Anatoly Lunacharsky's home. In her 1963 memoirs Natalya Lunacharskaya-Rosenel remembered:

We all gathered at eleven in the evening... [Mayakovsky] brought a large company with him: Sergei Tretyakov, Grossman-Roshchin, Lilya and Osip Briks, Malkin, Shterenberg, some other people... Instead of holding the recital at the small cabinet as planned, we had to go to the hall and move there all the chairs from the dining-room. All of us settled into a tight circle… Now, Lenin - for Anatoly Vasilyevich he was a leader, a teacher, a friend... I watched [his] face and saw, how with the words about the 'crying Bolsheviks' how his pince-nez glasses turned misty... As the recital was over, there was a minute's silence which for an author is more precious than any ovation... and then suddenly from the gallery above came a roaring applause and cries: 'Thank you! Thank you, Vladimir Vladimirovich!' It turned out that the artistic youth who gathered in my younger sister's room on the mezzanine silently creeped into the gallery and were listening from there, unobserved. This 'invasion' from the uninvited guests was so sincere and touching... Mayakovsky rose up the staircase, hugged the 'gatecrashers' and by their hands drew them downstairs."

== Critical reception ==
While the newspapers reported of highly successful public performances, the Soviet literary critics approached the poem with caution. One unreservedly positive review came from Novy Mir (No.9, 1925). "Of all that we have now in the Russian poetry on Lenin, Mayakovsky's poem stands out as the most significant thing... The author quite consciously introduced political journalism to his poetry and undoubtedly succeeded in justifying this ploy artistically. In his poem Ilyich lives everywhere, in every single event," the anonymous reviewer opined.

Poet and critic G. Lelevich, in Pechat i Revolyutsia (Press and Revolution, No.1, 1926), expressed his reservations:

"Surely, the poem is masterfully written, but the chasm between the brain and the heart here is painful. There are some emotionally charged, infectious bits, but as a whole this poem is the result of 'mind's cool reflections'... It's a tragedy that the ultra-individualistic verses 'about that' are strikingly sincere with Mayakovsky, while the Lenin poem, some exceptions aside, is cerebral and rhetorical. Neither singing paeans to the revolution through abstract logic, nor exploiting the bohemian and individualistic motives of old will do as the basis for Mayakovsky's huge talent's further development. He really needs to step over himself... The Lenin poem is a failed but significant and promising attempt to do just that.

Critic Viktor Pertsov (at the time a LEF activist) in his 1925 article "Revising the Left Front Policy in the Modern Russian Art", wrote: "The poem 'Vladimir Ilyich Lenin' is this extraordinarily strange, self-contradictory thing. On the one hand, the grief over this immense loss is cast in such words that won't fail to excite any of the future generations. Their condensed bitterness is a timeless battle cry, not just for the future, for the present too. On the other hand, several pages earlier we have the insufferable wordiness, cringeworthy naivety and clumsiness in the descriptions of Lenin's life, as well as [the history of the] working class. May be because… Lenin's genius is so huge, Mayakovsky should have stayed away from this historical narrative which proved to be so restrictive for his constructive horizons."
