= Vladimir Mayakovsky (tragedy) =

1914 Russian Futurist tragedy

- Author: Vladimir Mayakovsky
- Original title: Владимир Маяковский
- Language: Russian
- Genre: Avant-garde tragedy
- Publication date: 1914
- Publication place: Russia
- Media type: Print (hardback & paperback)

Vladimir Mayakovsky is a tragedy in verse by Vladimir Mayakovsky written in 1913, premiered on December 2 of that year and published in 1914 by the First Futurists' Journal, later to be included into the Simple as Mooing collection. An avant-garde verse drama, satirizing the urban life and, at the same time, hailing the upcoming revolution of the industrial power, it featured a set of bizarre, cartoonish characters and a poet protagonist.

== History ==
The play, which had two working titles, "The Railway" (Железная дорога) and "The Riot of Things" (Восстание вещей), was written in summer 1913 in Kuntsevo nearby Moscow, at the family friend Bogrovnikov's dacha where they resided from May 18 till the end of August. Sister Lyudmila Mayakovskaya remembered: "Volodya felt very lonely. For days he was roaming the Kuntsevo, Krylatsky and Rublyovo parks, composing his tragedy… [In the house] he scribbled words, lines and rhymes upon scraps of paper and cigarettes' boxes, imploring mother not to throw anything away." In October the work was completed.

On 9 November 1913 the Mayakovsky presented the copy of the play to the Petersburg theatrical censorship committee, having cut some of the risqué bits. In the first printed version of it which appeared in March 1914 in the First Futurist's Journal, phrases with words "God", "demented God" and "crucified prophet" were also removed.

== Plot ==
Prologue

Vladimir Mayakovsky, "the last of the poets," carrying his "soul on a plate for the Future's dinner," declares himself "the king of all lamps" and promises to reveal for the people their brand new, true souls.

Act 1

The Holiday of the Paupers goes on in the city. After an Old man (with cats) greets the advent of the new age of electricity and an Ordinary man protesting against the impending mutiny, gets brushed off, a giant woman gets unveiled and carried by the crowd to the Door to be just thrown down to the floor there. A riot of things commences, with human limbs running about, disconnected from their bodies.

Act II

At the city's main square Mayakovsky, dressed in toga is treated as a new god, people bringing him presents, three Tears among them. One man relates the story of how two kisses that's been given him turned into the babies and started to multiply. The Poet packs the three Tears he's received from the three women and promises to deliver them to the great Northern god.

Epilogue

The Poet says farewells to his followers he refers to as "my poor rats," declares Heavens "a cheat" and, after meditating upon what he'd rather be - "a rooster from Holland or a Pskovian king," - decides he likes "the sound of my name, Vladimir Mayakovsky, the best."

=== Characters ===
- Vladimir Mayakovsky, a poet, 20-25 years old
- His girlfriend, 2 or 3 sazhens (Note: One Russian sazhen (сажень) equals 7 feet) in size. Doesn't speak.
- An Old man with black and dry cats, several thousand years old
  An "ancient symbol" of electricity. Later in his article "No White Flags" (Без белых флагов) Mayakovsky thus explained the meaning of this image: "...The Egyptians and the Greeks while stroking black and dry cats might have been able to produce electric spark, yet it's not for them that we sing hymns of glory but for those who’s given shiny eyes to hanging heads and the power of a thousand arms poured into the humming tram arks."
- A man without a leg and an eye
- A man without an ear
- A man without a head
- A man with stretched-out face
- A man with two kisses
- An ordinary young man
- A woman with a small tear
- A woman with a tear
- A woman with a huge tear
- Paper boys, girls and others

== Reception and legacy ==
=== Premiere ===
According to actor Konstantin Tomashevsky, people attending rehearsals (Alexander Blok among them) were quite impressed with what was happening on stage. "Those were the times of turmoil, anxiety, dark forebodings. All of us instantly recognized in Mayakovsky a revolutionary, even if his hectic sermons to the human souls, mutilated by the vile city, sounded a bit muddled. It was an attempt at tearing off masks, revealing the sores of the society, sick beneath the veneer of respectability."

The play was premiered in December 1913 at the Saint Petersburg's Luna Park theatre, directed by Mayakovsky (also engaged in the leading role) and financed by the Union of Youth artistic collective, with stage decorations designed by Pavel Filonov and Iosif Shkolnik. Two days before the premiere all the original cast withdrew because rumours started to spread across the city that actors on stage would be thrown garbage at and beaten up by the public. Mayakovsky had to look for substitutes and settle for amateurs, mostly art students. The supporting actors, most of whom just stood on stage wearing white hoods, faces concealed behind cardboard symbols (painted by Pavel Filonov), and were looking out from time to time only to pronounce cues, were visibly frightened. The (mostly middle-class) public was hostile and behaved as aggressively as Mayakovsky who was pacing up and down the stage, throwing invectives at them.

As his character, The Poet, having received his "three tears" (one looking more like a cannonball) started to pack them into his suit-case, some people in the audience started shouting: "Stop him immediately!.. Catch him!.. He is not to get away!.. Make him give us back our money!" One of the rotten eggs hurled hit Mayakovsky's shoulder. Later several papers accused the author and his cast of crookery and demanded them to be taken to justice.

=== Later critical reception ===
Both Luna Park shows, on December 2 and 4, were negatively reviewed by the press. "[The tragedy] was torn down to pieces," Mayakovsky conceded in his autobiography.

"The uproar which followed was of such proportions that the expected hits of the season, performances in Petersburg by actor Max Linder and child prodigy conductor Willy Ferrero, came and went almost unnoticed. Throughout Russia, in Riga, Taganrog, Ryazan, Kertch, Yekaterinodar, Warsaw numerous reviews were published, quite extraordinary in their fervency. Never before a stage production has been destroyed with such fierceness by the press across the whole country," biographer A.Mikhaylov wrote.

"Who's more insane, the Futurists or the public?", Peterburgskaya Gazeta enquired rhetorically. "We won't recall another such case of a theatrical stage abuse," maintained Peterburgsky Listok, dismissing the text of the poem as "white fever delirium." "The society that responds by laughter to being spat upon, should be ashamed of itself," Teatralnaya Zhyzn's reviewer wrote.

After 1917 the Soviet critics hailed the play as a "daring swipe at the bourgeois values," admiring the way the author has "dethroned the old, decrepit God who'd lost all ability to do anything for people, to place a Poet protagonist upon the pedestal."

== See also ==
- The Gas Heart
