= Prozasedavshiyesya =

Poem by Vladimir Mayakovsky (1922)

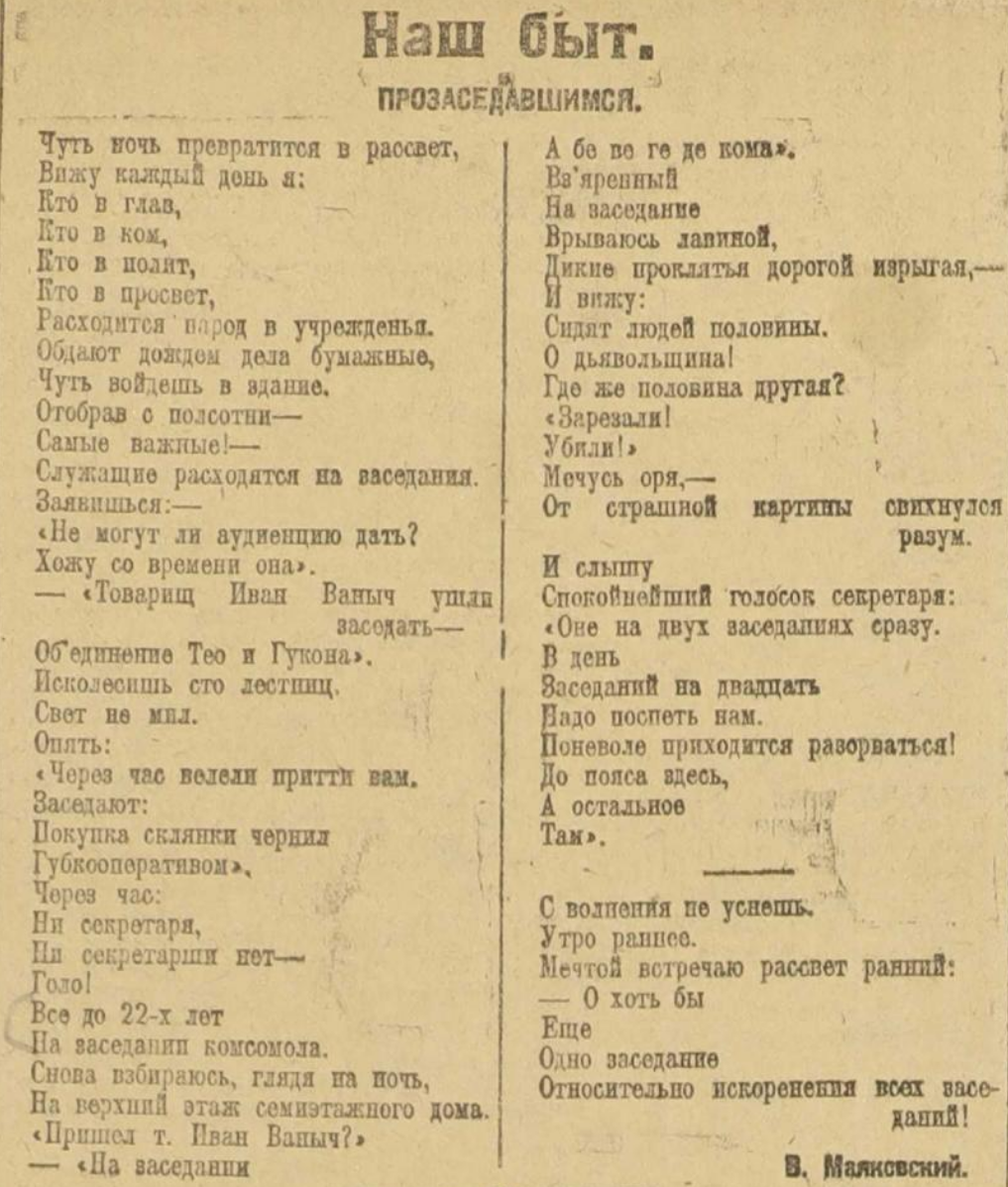
Fragment from the Izvestia newspaper from March 5, 1922, with V. Mayakovsky's poem "The Over-Meetinged"

"Prozasedavshiyesya" (Russian: Прозаседавшиеся, lit. 'The Over-Meetinged') also translated as "In Re Conferences" and "Mayakonferensky's Anectidote", is a poem by Vladimir Mayakovsky. It was published on 5 March 1922 in the newspaper Izvestia (No. 52) under the title "Nash byt. Prozasedavshimsya" (Note: lit. 'Our Everyday Life. To the Over-Meetinged', Russian: Наш быт. Прозаседавшимся). The poem addresses the pressing issues of that period: famine, post-revolutionary devastation, foreign intervention, and the dominance of bureaucracy. This poem marked the beginning of Mayakovsky’s collaboration with Izvestia. Previously, the writer had not been published in the newspaper due to the stance of its then editor-in-chief, Yuri Steklov, who was away at the time the cooperation agreement was made and was being substituted by the executive secretary of the editorial board, Oleg Litovsky.

The work exhibits features of the author's individuality, which introduced the word prozasedavshiyesya into the Russian language. Furthermore, the poem displays the device of semantic intensification of a word, acquiring a grotesque character, a technique Mayakovsky employed very frequently in his works.

On 6 March, Vladimir Lenin, speaking to the communist faction of the All-Russian Congress of Metalworkers, praised the poem., despite his negative attitude toward Futurism, which Mayakovsky represented. The poem became Mayakovsky’s first major statement against bureaucratism. Lenin saw in it the writer's response to a universal problem of the time. Lunacharsky recalled that the poem "greatly amused Vladimir Ilyich, and he even repeated certain lines." Lenin subsequently assessed it as a very bold and correct act of self-criticism. The leader’s praise encouraged the poet. Following this, Mayakovsky intensified criticism and self-criticism in other publications; his satire targeted bigots and sycophants, slanderers and cowards, officials and servile functionaries. Lenin’s response dispelled the atmosphere of distrust that Mayakovsky’s opponents had attempted to create around his name.
