= The West (Mayakovsky) =

Poetry collection by Vladimir Majakovski

- Author: Vladimir Mayakovsky
- Original title: Запад
- Language: Russian
- Genre: Poetry
- Publisher: Izvestiya, Parizhsky Vestnik, Krasnaya Niva, Krasnaya Nov, Gosizdat
- Publication date: 1922-1935
- Publication place: USSR
- Media type: Print (hardback & paperback)

The West (Russian: Запад) is a ten-poem-cycle by Vladimir Mayakovsky written in 1922-1924 after his extensive foreign tour which included visits to Latvia, Italy, Germany, France and the United Kingdom. It was followed in 1925 by an eight-poem cycle, Paris (Париж), inspired by the impressions from his visit to France. Originally the two cycles were seen as separate collections. Compiling the material for the first edition of The Works by V.V. Mayakovsky, the author put them under one heading.

The 1922–1924 poems were published originally in the USSR, mostly by Izvestiya newspaper. Five of his French poems first appeared in Parizhsky Vestnik, a short-lived (1925–1926) newspaper which was based in Paris, sub-titled Messager russe de Paris and supported by the Soviet Embassy in the city.

== Poems ==
=== The West ===
- Kak rabotayet respublika demokraticheskaya? (Как работает республика демократическая?, How Does the Democratic Republic Work?). Izvestiya, 23 May 1922. Inspired by Mayakovsky's first foreign trip, to Riga, Latvia, in May 1922.
- Moya retch na Genuezskoi konferentsii (Моя речь на генуэзской конференции, My Speech at the Genoa Conference). Izvestiya, 12 April 1922.
- Na tsep! (На цепь!, Chain Them!). Izvestya, 16 January 1923.
- Germania (Германия, Germany). Izvestiya, 4 January 1923.
- Parizh. Razgovorchiki s Eifelevoi bashney (Париж. Разговорчики с Эйфелевой башней., Paris. Conversations With the Eiffel Tower). Krasnaya Niva, No.9, 1923.
- O tom, kak u Kerzona s obedom razrastalas appetitov zona (О том, как у Керзона с обедом разрасталась аппетитов зона, How Curzon's Appetites Grew As the Dinner Went On). Izvestiya, 3 June 1923.
- Vorovsky. (Воровский) Izvestia, 20 May 1923. Published on the day of arrival to Moscow of the remnants of the Soviet diplomat Vatslav Vorovsky, assassinated in Lausanne, Switzerland, on 10 May.
- Kinopovetriye (Киноповетрие, Movie Craze). Ogonyok, No.8, 1924. Written in summer 1923 after his second trip to Germany, the poem is a response to the great success of the Charlie Chaplin films and the German's audiences' alleged failure to realise that it was Europe that 'Comrade Charlot' (as the actor is here being referred to) makes fun of.
- Norderney (Нордерней). Izvestya, 12 August 1923.
- Uzhe! (Уже!, Already!). Krasnaya Niva, No. 3, 1924.

=== Paris ===
Mayakovsky spent November and December 1924 in France. These impressions inspired eight poems written from late 1924 to early 1925. On his way to the US, in May of that year, he came to the offices of Parizhsky Vestnik and left there five poems with the permission to publish them.

- Yedu (Еду, Here I Come). Parizhsky Vestnik, 3 June 1925. Later Prozhektor magazine, No.12, 1925.
- Gorod (Город, The City). Parizhsky Vestnik, 3 June 1925. Prozhektor, No.12, 1925.
- Verlaine and Cezanne (Верлен и Сезанн). Parizhsky Vestnik, 24 June 1925. Prozhektor, No.13, 1925.
- Notre-Dame (Нотр-Дам). Krasnaya Niva, No. 1, 1925
- Versalles (Версаль). Krasnaya Nov, No. 1, 1925.
- Jaurès (Жорес). Krasnaya Niva, No. 2, 1925. Mayakovsky was in France in November 1924, when the French Socialist leader's ashes were moved to the Paris' Panthéon. The poem was inspired by this event.
- Proshchaniye. Cafe (Прощание. Кафе). Parizhsky Vestnik, 3 June 1925. Ogonyok, No 28, 1925.
- Proshchanje. (Прощанье) Parizhsky Vestnik, 3 June 1925
