= A Cloud in Trousers =

1915 Russian-language poem by Vladimir Mayakovsky

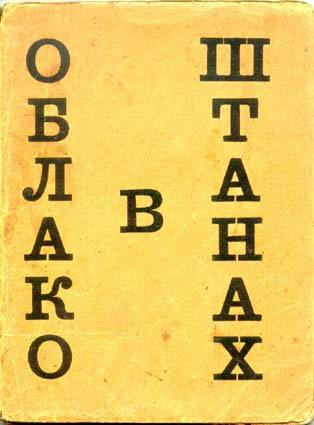
- The 2nd edition, 1918
- Author: Vladimir Mayakovsky
- Original title: Облако в штанах
- Language: Russian
- Genre: Poem
- Publication date: 1915
- Publication place: Russian Empire
- Media type: Print (hardback & paperback)

A Cloud in Trousers (Облако в штанах, Oblako v shtanakh) is a poem by Vladimir Mayakovsky written in 1914 and first published in 1915 by Osip Brik.

Originally titled The 13th Apostle (but renamed at the advice of a censor) Mayakovsky's first major poem was written from the vantage point of a spurned lover, depicting the heated subjects of love, revolution, religion and art, taking the poet's stylistic choices to a new extreme, linking irregular lines of declamatory language with surprising rhymes. It is considered to be a turning point in his work and one of the cornerstones of the Russian Futurist poetry.

The poem is initially set in a hotel, where a male protagonist is waiting for his love, Maria. When she arrives, she announces her engagement to someone else. Suffering from destructive emotions, the protagonist becomes a self-defined "preaching" Zarathustra and a new "man–God" (simultaneously a human and a deity). He wanders the streets to pronounce his own version of the Sermon on the Mount. The character then has thoughts of madness, futility, and despair, as he reaches a point of mental breakdown. The poem has specific references to psychiatric wards.

== Synopsis ==
Structurally, the poem is closer to a diptych. In Part I the protagonist is waiting for his love, Maria, in a hotel. She finally appears and informs him of her engagement. He remains visibly unperturbed, but internally suffers an explosion of destructive emotions and furious metaphors:

Now I'll go and play.

The fiery curve of my brow flawless.

A house that was destroyed by flame

Is sometimes occupied by the homeless.

Parts II and III contain brutal attacks on the contemporary poetry, praises of the Man who "holds the conveyors of the world in the palm of his hand", and prophesizes the revolution and the emergence of the new, freed mankind. The protagonist, a self-defined "preaching, thrashing Zarathustra", sees himself as a new man–God and enters the "tongueless streets" to pronounce his own Sermon on the Mount.

Where the human eye fails in confusion,

The hungry hordes loom:

Wearing the crown of thorns of revolutions

Year 16 brings doom.

Part IV sees the protagonist's return to being tormented by unrequited love, which eventually brings him to the act of deicide, as he blames God for creating an unhappy world, where unanswered love is possible:

Almighty, you gave us an assortment:

A head and a pair of hands to exist.

Why couldn’t you make it so, without torment,

We could kiss, kiss, and kiss?!

He sees Love in the modern world as doomed, being destroyed by art, religion and the society itself.

The theme of madness that first appeared in Part III ("The thought of psychiatric wards came and curtained my brain in despair" and "This is all madness. Nothing with happen.") develops into a mental breakdown of the protagonist in the Finale, which is followed by emotional exhaustion and silence.

== Background ==
The subject of Mayakovsky's unrequited love was Maria Denisova, whom he met in Odessa during the Futurists' 1913 tour. Born in 1894 in Kharkov to a poor peasant family, Maria at the time resided with the family of her sister (whose husband Filippov was an affluent man) and was an art school student, learning sculpture. Vasily Kamensky described Denisova as "a girl of a rare combination of qualities: good looks, sharp intellect, strong affection for all things new, modern and revolutionary."

Maria's sister Yekaterina Denisova, who ran a domestic literary salon, invited the three now famous young Futurist poets, Mayakovsky, Burlyuk and Kamensky, to their house. Prior to this Maria and Vladimir met three weeks earlier at the Mir Iskusstva exhibition, but that was a fleeting acquaintance. Mayakovsky fell in love instantly and gave her the nickname Gioconda, in reference to the Mona Lisa. (Note: The line in the poem: "You spoke of Jack London, money, love and passion / I saw just Gioconda which had to be stolen", referred to the incident of the famous Da Vinci's painting's disappearance from the Louvres in 1911–1913.)

The intensity of Mayakovsky's passion was unbearable. According to Kamensky, he suffered immensely and was hectically rushing things, caring not for what he thought to be the girl's indecisiveness and fussiness. It looked as if he completely misunderstood the situation: Maria (unlike her sister) was just not impressed either by the Futurists, or by Mayakovsky. Indecisive she was anything but; "on the contrary, her later life proved to be the chain of extraordinary events, triggered by most daring, reckless decisions", according to biographer Mikhaylov.

In the mid-1910s Maria Denisova lived in Switzerland with her first husband, then, as the latter moved to England, returned to the Soviet Russia. She fought in the Russian Civil War and married the Red Army general Efim Shchadenko whom she divorced in the late 1920s. Denisova became an established Soviet monumentalist sculptor, one of her better known works being "The Poet" (1927), Mayakovsky's head set in plaster. In the late 1930s she fell into obscurity and stopped seeing friends, one of her two daughters, Alice, having fled to England. Denisova committed suicide in 1944 by jumping from the tenth floor.

== History ==
Mayakovsky started working on the poem (which he said was born "as a letter, while on a train") in early 1914. He finished it in July 1915, in Kuokkala. Speaking at the Krasnaya Presnya Komsomol Palace in 1930, Mayakovsky remembered: "It started as a letter in 1913/14 and was first called "The Thirteenth Apostle". As I came to see the censors, one of them asked me: Dreaming of doing a forced labour, eh? 'By no means, I said, no such plans at all.' So they erased six pages, as well as the title. Then, there's the question about where the title has come from. Once somebody asked me how could I combine lyricism with coarseness. I replied: 'Simple: you want me rabid, I'll be it. Want me mild, and I'm not a man, a cloud in trousers.'"

The first extracts from the poem (part of the Prologue and Part 4) appeared in the Strelets (Sagittarius) compilation in February 1915. Several stanzas were published as extensive quotes in Zhurnal Zhurnalov (The Journals' Journal) by Mayakovsky himself in his article "On the Many Mayakovskys". In February 1915 at the Strelets'-related party in the Stray Dog artistic basement featured Mayakovsky reciting fragments of it to the audience, Maxim Gorky among the guests. In July 1915 he read some of it to Gorky personally.

"Travelled to Mustamyaki. M.Gorky [was here]. Read him the Cloud's fragments. So moved to tears Gorky was as to soak my vest. The degree to which I upset him made me almost proud. It was only later that I learned he'd been sobbing this way upon every poetical vest coming his way", Mayakovsky wrote in his autobiography. According to actress Maria Andreyeva, Gorky (who hated the Futurists) admired Mayakovsky. Still, he was taken aback by "the extreme loudness" of his poetic voice. "Once he told him, 'Look, here's just [your] sunrise, and there you are, running out wild to give this enormous yell. How are you to keep it up? The day is long, and there is a lot for you to live through."

=== Publications ===
Initially none of the publishers wanted to have anything to do with the poem. Finally published in September 1915 by Osip Brik (who also financed the publication) it came out severely cut. "The Cloud turned to be a cirrus one, censors blew it through. Some six pages amounted to mere dots", Mayakovsky wrote in his I, Myself autobiography. As with the Vladimir Mayakovsky, most targeted were the religion-related images.

In 1916 the poem was included into the Simple as Mooing compilation, published by the Gorky-led Parus (The Sail) publishing house. Cuts here were less drastic but there were some. On 17 March 1917 Mayakovsky published in Novy Satyricon's No.11 issue the full versions of Parts 2 and 3 of the poem (75 lines in all), under the title "Reinstate" (Восстанавливаю).

For the first time the whole uncensored text of the poem was published in early 1918 by the Moscow company Asis (abbreviation of Ассоциация социалистического искусства, The Association of Socialist Art). In a foreword Mayakovsky wrote: "I consider A Cloud in Pants (the original title, "The Thirteenth Apostle", was banned by censors, but I'd rather not go back to it: got used to this one) a canon of contemporary art. 'Damn your love,' 'Damn your art,' 'Damn your regime,' 'Damn your religion' – [such are] the four cries of the four parts."
