= The Man (poem) =

- 1918 edition. Inscription: "To Alexey Maximovich with tenderness, Mayakovsky."
- Author: Vladimir Mayakovsky
- Original title: Человек
- Language: Russian
- Genre: Poem
- Publication date: 1918
- Publication place: Russia
- Media type: Print (hardback & paperback)

The Man (Человек, Tchelovek) is a poem by Vladimir Mayakovsky written in late-1916 - early-1917 and published in February 1918 by the ASIS Publishers, subtitled "The Thing" (Вещь).

== Plot ==
The story is built along the lines of the Gospel (The Advent of Mayakovsky, the Life of Mayakovsky, the Rise of Mayakovsky, et cetera). Back on Earth after one thousand years the Poet discovers the street he's lived on and shot himself at, "by the door of the beloved," bears his name. This detail acquired a sinister overtone after Mayakovsky committed suicide in 1930, troubled love life cited as one of the reasons.

According to biographer A. Mikhaylov, the poem's protagonist is an oversensitive young man who suffers from social injustice and longs for social upheaval. The hero is a bizarre hybrid of a lofty neo-romantic superman and a real-life Mayakovsky, the former fighting the universal evils, the latter getting bogged down into petty everyday conflicts. At the crux of the poem lies the idea of futility of man's aspirations, both personal and social, due to the baseness of human nature and the power of money ruling the world.

== Premiere ==
In December 1917 Mayakovsky moved to Moscow from Petrograd and settled in the San-Remo hotel. He recited his new work several times, most famously at the Poetic Tournament which took place in late January 1918 at the poet Mikhail Tsetlin's house and featured the stars of the "two generations of Russian poetry," including Konstantin Balmont, Vyacheslav Ivanov, Andrey Bely, Yurgis Baltrushaitis, Marina Tsvetayeva, David Burlyuk, Vasily Kamensky, Ilya Ehrenburg, Vladislav Khodasevich, Boris Pasternak, Alexey Tolstoy, Pavel Antokolsky, Vera Inber.

This potentially conflicting meeting had an unexpected outcome: Mayakovsky's rendition was praised almost unanimously by the poets of the older generation, while Burlyuk was overly aggressive and apparently jealous. Particularly impressed was Andrey Bely, who declared that it was beyond his comprehension how such profoundly powerful, deep poem could have been created here in Russia, and that it was "way ahead now of the whole world literature." According to Nikolai Aseev, Bely's impassioned "speech itself became a revelation for many and caused an ovation."
