= 150 000 000 =

1921 poem by Vladimir Mayakovsky

- 1921 edition cover. "To Comrade Vladimir Ilyich with our ComFut greetings. Vladimir Mayakovsky."; Also signed by Lilya and Osip Brik, Boris Kushner, B. Malkin, David Shterenberg and Nathan Altman.
- Author: Vladimir Mayakovsky
- Language: Russian
- Genre: Poem
- Publisher: Gosizdat (GIZ)
- Publication date: 1921
- Publication place: Soviet Russia
- Media type: Print (hardback & paperback)

150 000 000 (Russian: Sto pyat'desyat millionov) is a poem by Vladimir Mayakovsky written in 1919–1920 and first published in April 1921 by GIZ (Gosizdat) Publishers, originally anonymously. The poem, hailing the 150-million-strong Russian people's mission in starting the world revolution (represented here as an allegorical battle of the Russian Ivan and the American president Woodrow Wilson, the embodiment of the capitalist evil), failed to impress the Soviet revolutionary leader Vladimir Lenin who apparently saw in it little but a pretentious Futuristic experiment.

== History ==
Mayakovsky conceived and started writing the poem in the first half of 1919 and completed it in March 1920. Among its several working titles were "The Will of the Millions" (Воля миллионов, Volya millionov), "The Tale of Ivan" (Былина об Иване, Bylina ob Ivane) and "Ivan The Bylina. The Revolutionary Epic" (Иван Былина. Эпос революции; Ivan Bylina. Epos revolyutsii).

On 5 March 1920 Mayakovsky recited fragments of the poem at the event celebrating the opening of the All-Russian Union of Poets Club in Moscow. He read it in full on 4 and 20 of December of the same year, at the Petrograd House of Arts and Polytechnic Museum in Moscow, respectively.

The poem first appeared in fragments in Khudozhestvennoye Slovo (Artistic Word) magazine's October 1920 issue. As a separate edition it came out in April 1921, published by Gosizdat (GIZ) without the name of the author mentioned. The reason for this anonymity was explained in the poem's first two stanzas: "150 millions is the name of this poem's master / Bullet is rhythm, flame's a rhyme jumping from house to house. / 150 millions speak through my mouth / Masses marching over the stepping-stone paper is the offset duplicator machine getting these pages printed. // Who'd enquire the Moon and the Sun of what makes them bring out day and night, who’d demand the name of creator genius? / The same's with this poem: it hasn't got one single author."

"Completed 150 Millions. Published it anonymously, so that everyone could add things and improve it. Nobody did, everybody knew the name of the author anyway. Well, whatever. Now it comes out with my name on," Mayakovsky commented in I, Myself autobiography ("Year 1920" chapter).

== Reception ==
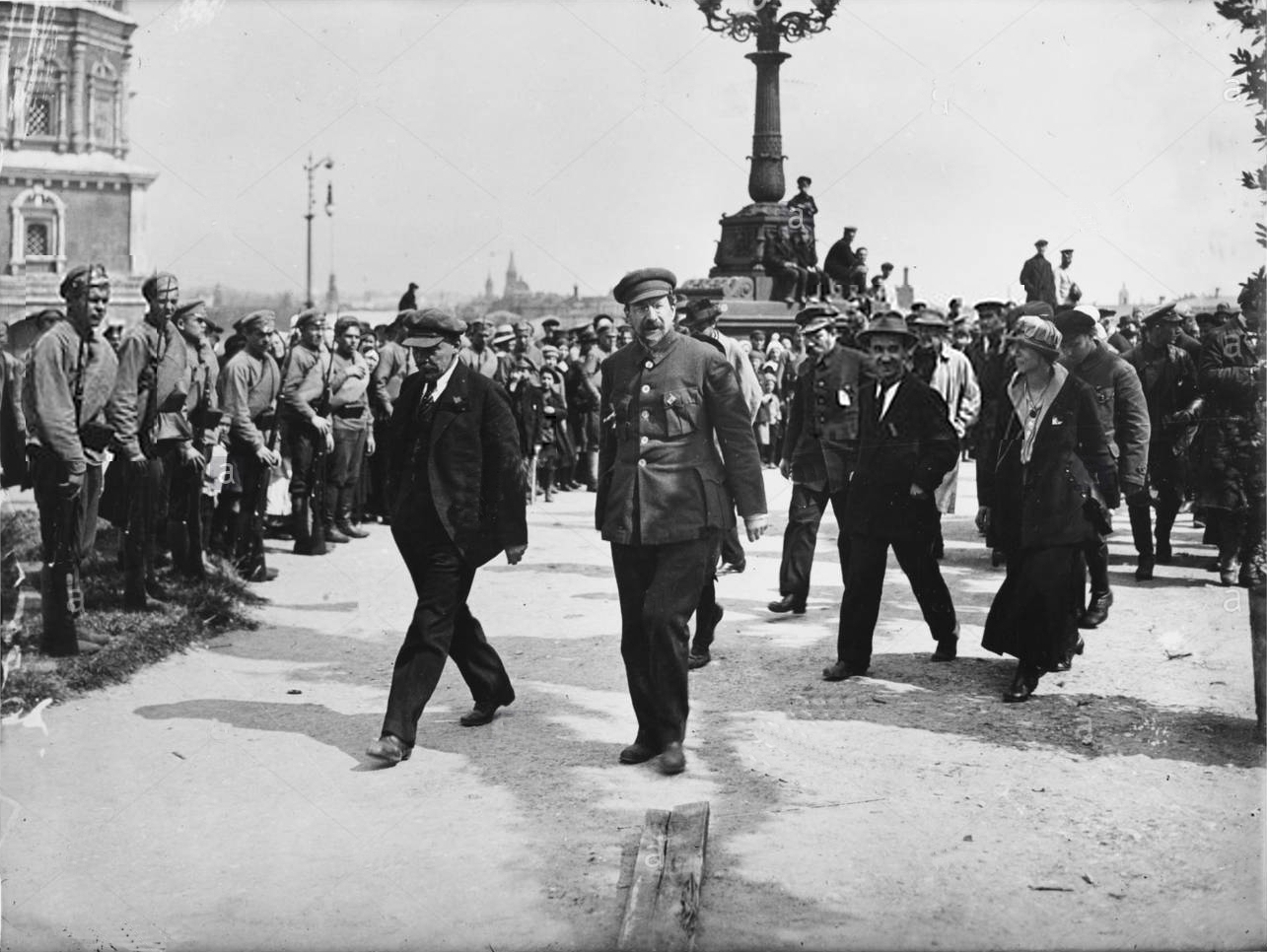
Anatoly Lunacharsky (right) championed the poem which Vladimir Lenin (left) dismissed as "pretentious and dodgy".

Mayakovsky's public recitals in Moscow and Petrograd had great success, but in higher places the publication caused controversy. Vladimir Lenin, for whom Mayakovsky was just "one of those Futurists" (whom he reviled) was outraged with the fact that Gosizdat printed 5 thousand copies of the poem which he found "pretentious and dodgy".

On 6 May 1921 in the course of one of the Soviet government's meetings Lenin forwarded a note to Lunacharsky: "You should be ashamed of yourself, having supported the printing of 5 thousand copies of Mayakovsky's 150 000 000. Its nonsensical, utterly silly and pretentious. I reckon no more than 1 of 10 books of this ilk should be published, and in 1500 copies maximum, for libraries and oddballs who enjoy reading such things. You, Lunacharsky, should be caned for your Futurism. Lenin".

On the flip side of the paper there is Lunacharsky's written reply: "For me personally this particular thing holds little appeal. But – 1) no lesser poet than Brysov expressed his delight and demanded for 20 000 [copies] to be printed, 2) the poem, as recited by its author, had great success - mind you, with the workers' audience." Indeed, in August 1920 Bryusov sent a letter to the Gosizdat leadership: "The board of directors of the Narkompros' Literary and Publishing Department (ЛИТО) received the manuscript of c(omrade) Mayakovsky's 150 Millions, found the poem extremely important from the propagandistic point of view and suggests that it should be published as soon as possible."

Lenin, obviously dissatisfied with Lunacharsky's reply, sent to Gosizdat's director M.N.Pokrovsky a similar note, demanding that the publication of the works by "those Futurists" should be curtailed. The note ended with the question: "Would it be possible for us to find some reliable anti-Futurists?"

There is evidence, though, that Lenin still professed some interest to Mayakovsky's poetry, at least occasionally. According to the Soviet literary historian E. Naumov, there is one "still unpublished verbatim account of one of the disputes under the Lunacharsky's chairmanship, concerning the Left Front of the Arts (LEF). The Gosizdat director N.L.Meshcheryakov, having credited the LEF writers with supporting the revolution, added: "I recall one curious episode. After his poem's 150 000 000's release, Mayakovsky took one copy, wrote upon its cover: "To Comrade Vladimir Ilyich with our ComFut greetings, Vladimir Mayakovsky" and sent it. Lenin, a lively, open and curious man, upon reading it, commented: "But it's an intriguing kind of literature, you know. It represents one very special brand of communism. It's the hooligan communism."

== Plot ==
Ivan defeats Wilson. Illustration by I.Staroselsky.

Driven by hunger, rage, and hatred for the hostile world, Russians leave their homes to march over the land, joined by animals, machines and gubernias, merging into one sweeping force, with intent on "doing this old romantic world in".

In Chicago, the world revolution's worst enemy Woodrow Wilson abides in a giant hotel, sporting a bowler-hat "higher than Sukharev Tower." Among his servants Adelina Patti, Fyodor Chalyapin and Ilya Mechnikov are notable.

The rumor of a storm coming from the Pacific spreads among the people of Chicago, sunbathing on the ocean beach. Soon it transpires that the reason behind this cataclysm is mysterious Ivan's approaching them, walking on water. Wilson makes a decision to confront the enemy face to face, gets all of his fat turned into muscles by some magic ointment and arms himself with revolvers and a 70-blade sabre.

The world gets divided into two: half of it joins Ivan (in fact, merges with him, physically), the other half runs away for Wilson's protection. Ivan steps upon the beach without having wetted his feet, and challenges Wilson, now clad in armory, for a showdown. The "World Class Struggle Championship Final" takes place on Chicago's central square. Wilson strikes first and slashed armless Ivan, but out of the wound, instead of blood, peoples, machines, gubernias, et cetera start to pour out to attack the old world.

Wilson, sieged in his palace, spreads out famine, diseases and, worst of all, "ideas" to ward the enemy off, but to no avail. He dies, gets "scorched out" and the rejoicing world marches into the Future, ruled by "a genius Cain." A hundred years on, and everybody (the visiting Martians included) is celebrating the victory, remembering "the Revolution's bloody Ilyad."
