= Lyudmila Mayakovskaya =

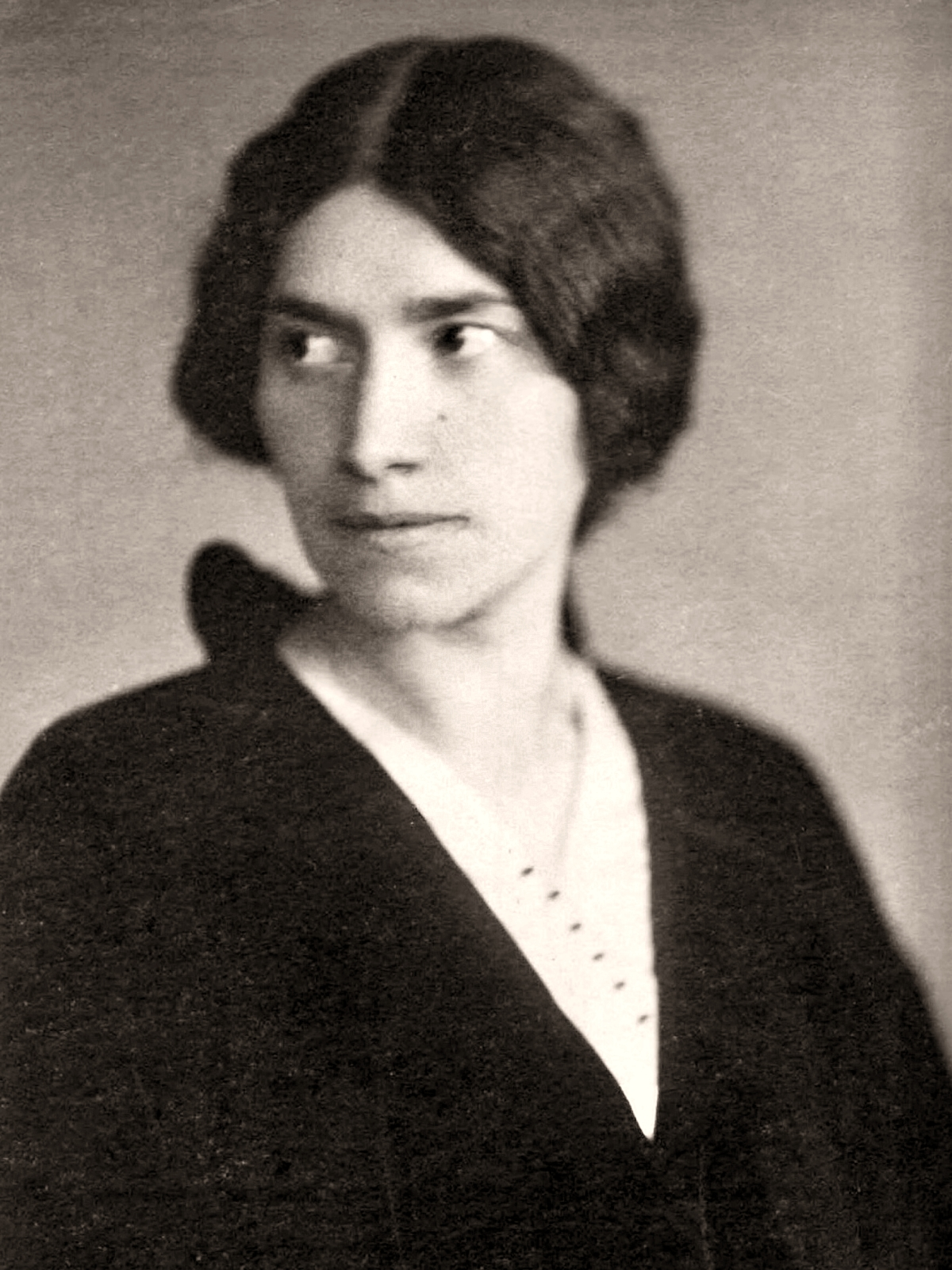
- Born: Lyudmila Vladimirovna Mayakovskaya; 24 August 1884; Fioletovo, Alexandropol uezd, Erivan Governorate, Russian Empire
- Died: 12 September 1972 (aged 88); Moscow, Soviet Union

Lyudmila Vladimirovna Mayakovskaya (Russian: Людми́ла Влади́мировна Маяко́вская; 24 August 1884— 12 September 1972) was a Russian and Soviet textile designer and teacher. She was the elder sister of the poet Vladimir Mayakovsky.

== Life ==
Lyudmila Mayakovskaya was born in the village of Fioletovo. In 1910 she graduated from the Stroganov Moscow State Academy of Arts and Industry, worked as an artist-designer for textiles at the Moscow enterprises «Trekhgornaya textile manufacture» and the Red Banner Textile Factory in Moscow, where she headed the aerography workshop. She was the first woman in the factory to hold an administrative and technical position before the revolution in Russia.

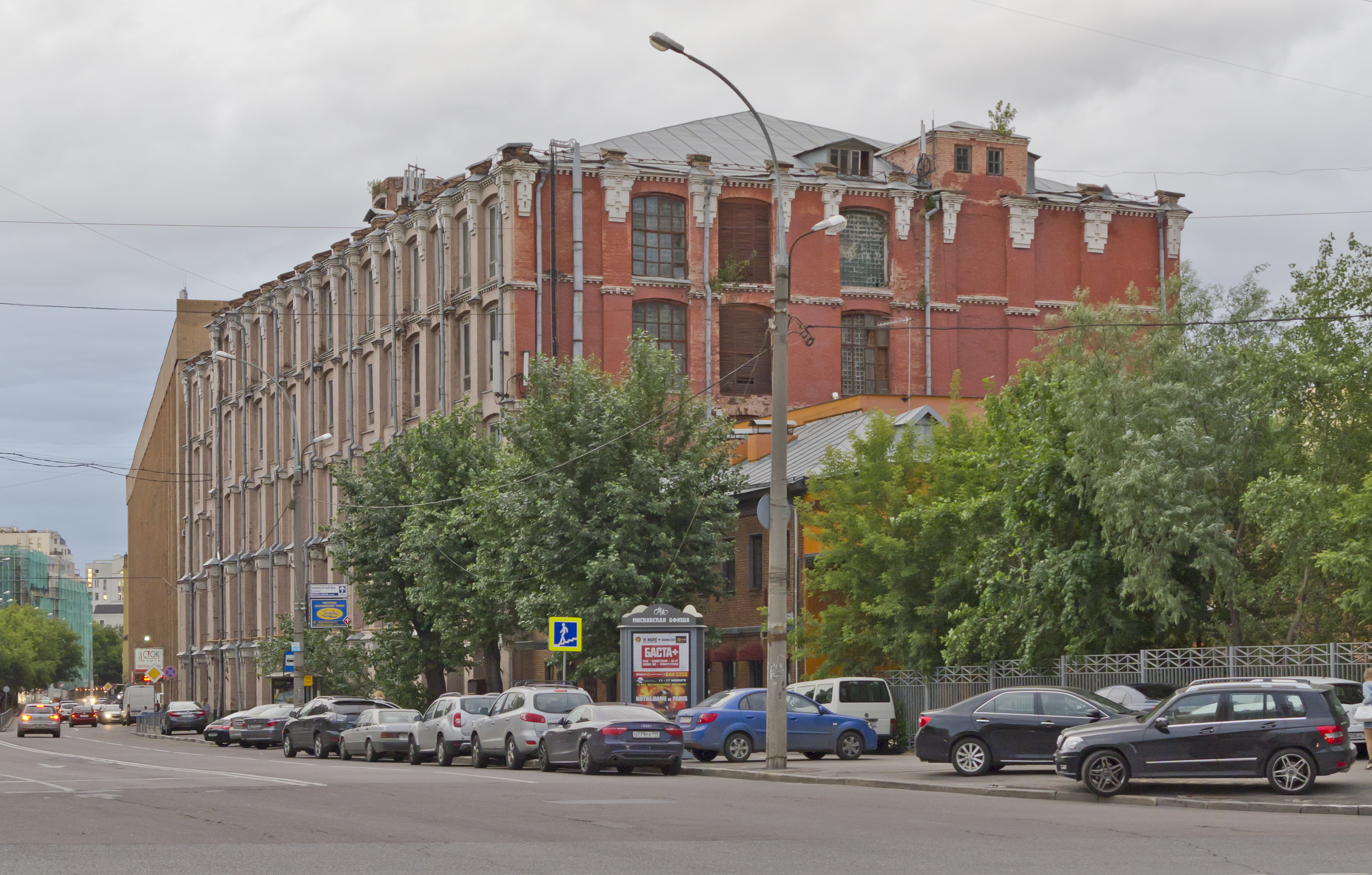
Trekhgornaya textile manufacture at Presnya, Moscow

In 1925, she participated in the International Exhibition of Modern Decorative and Industrial Arts in Paris, where she received a silver medal for her work. In the same year, she invents and patents a new method of obtaining patterns in Russia.

From 1929 to 1949 she taught at the faculty of tissue design at the Moscow State Textile University and was an assistant professor in the special compositions department. She was training fabric artists at Vkhutemas. Among her students were artists such as Tatiana Klyukas, Natalia Ganina-Kravtsova, Natalia Kiseleva and others.

She published several biographical books about her brother, Vladimir Mayakovsky.

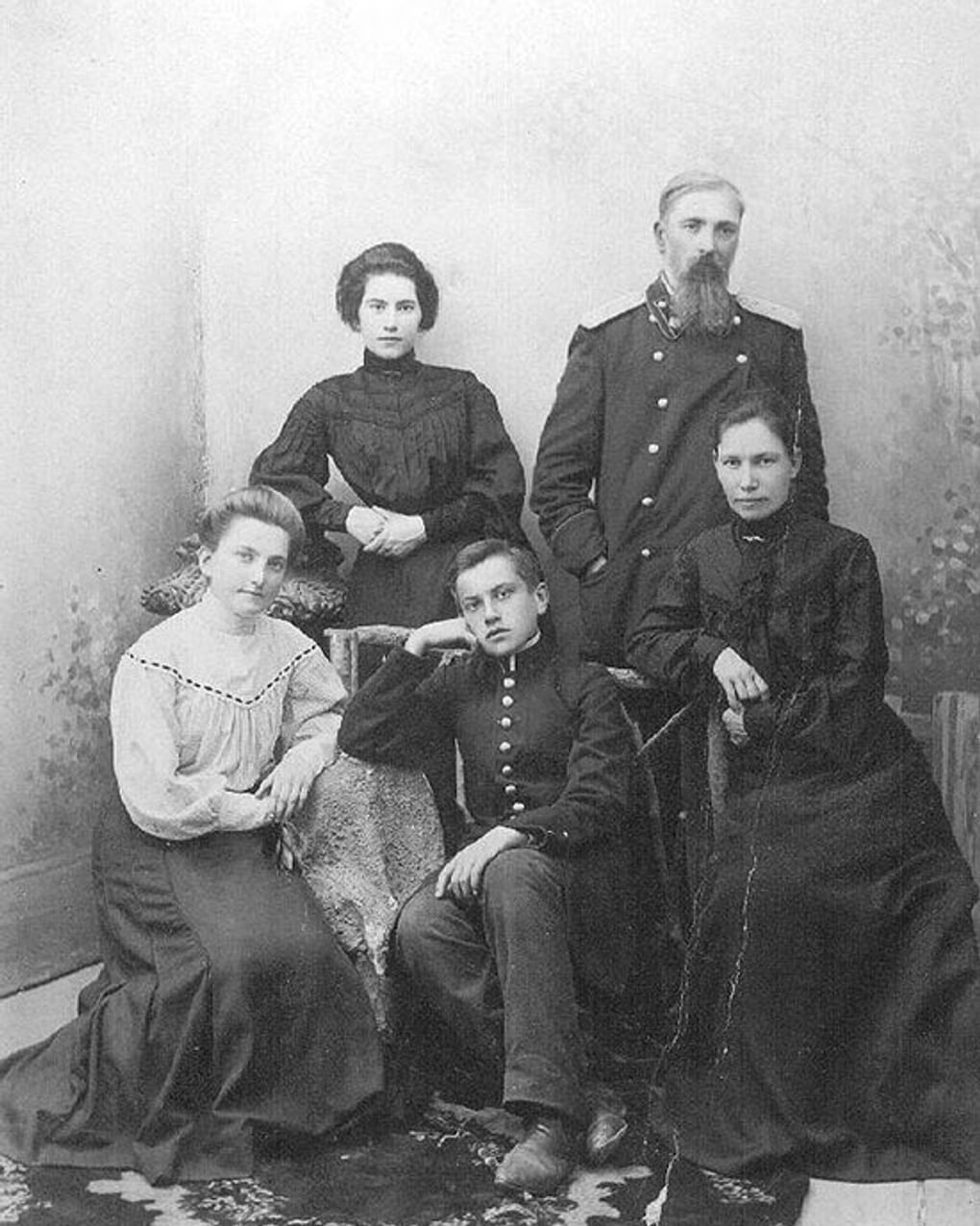
The Mayakovsky family in Kutaisi, 1905

Her exhibitions were held in France, United Kingdom, Italy, Russia. Her name is included in the catalog «Women of Russian Avant-garde», published in the USA. The works of Mayakovskaya for the American catalog were selected personally by Giorgio Armani.

Lyudmila Mayakovskaya. Textile sample. Velvet, airbrush

== Honours and awards ==
- Silver Medal of the International Exhibition of Modern Decorative and Industrial Arts (1925)
- Diploma of Honor and the 2nd prize of the 1st Art Exhibition «Household Soviet Textiles» (1929)
- Medal "In Commemoration of the 800th Anniversary of Moscow" (1948)
- Honoured Cultural Worker of the RSFSR (1964)
- Order of the Red Banner of Labour (1964)
