= 2001 in public domain =

When a work's copyright expires, it enters the public domain. The following is a list of works that entered the public domain in 2001. Since laws vary globally, the copyright status of some works are not uniform.

== Entered the public domain in countries with life + 70 years ==
With the exception of Belarus (Life + 50 years) and Spain (Life + 80 years for creators that died before 1987), a work enters the public domain in Europe 70 years after the creator's death, if it was published during the creator's lifetime. The list is sorted alphabetically and includes a notable work of the creator that entered the public domain on January 1, 2001.

Names	Country	Birth	Death	Occupation	Notable work
Iso Mutsu	United Kingdom	1867	1930	historian, travel writer	Kamakura: Fact and Legend
Edward Bok	United States	9 October 1863	9 January 1930	magazine editor, non-fiction writer	Why I Believe in Poverty, The Americanization of Edward Bok, A Dutch Boy Fifty Years After, A Man from Maine
Johannes Gillhoff	Germany	24 May 1861	16 January 1930	teacher, researcher of the expressions and speech patterns of Low German, novelist	Mecklenburgischen Volksrätseln (Mecklenburg folk riddles), Jürnjakob Swehn der Amerikafahrer (Jürnjakob Swehn, the Traveler to America), Mecklenburgischen Monatshefte (Mecklenburg monthly notes)
Rebecca Latimer Felton	United States	10 June 1835	24 January 1930	white supremacist politician, activist for prison reform, women's suffrage and education reform,	My Memoirs of Georgia Politics, Country Life in Georgia in the Days of my Youth, The Romantic Story of Georgia's Women
Alice Williams Brotherton	United States	4 April 1848	9 February 1930	poet, essayist, children's writer, literary scholar, specialist on the works of William Shakespeare	Beyond the veil, What the wind told to the tree-tops, The sailing of King Olaf : and other poems, The real Hamlet and the Hamlet oldest of all, Debasing the Poetic Coinage the Quality and Function of Poetry
George Haven Putnam	United States	2 April 1844	27 February 1930	publisher, president of the publishing company G. P. Putnam's Sons, activist for copyright protection for authors, memoirist, children's writer	Books and Their Makers During the Middle Ages, Censorship of the Church of Rome and Its Influence Upon the Production and Distribution of Literature, A Prisoner of War in Virginia, Memories of a Publisher, Some Memories of the Civil War, The Little Gingerbread Man
Joseph Wright	United Kingdom	31 October 1855	27 February 1930	Germanic philologist, university professor, lexicographer	The English Dialect Dictionary, An Old High-German Primer, A Grammar of the Dialect of Windhill in the West Riding of Yorkshire: Illustrated by a Series of Dialect Specimens, Phonetically Rendered; with a Glossarial Index of the Words Used in the Grammar and Specimens, A Primer of the Gothic Language, The English Dialect Grammar, comprising the dialects of England, of the Shetland and Orkney islands, and of those parts of Scotland, Ireland & Wales where English is habitually spoken, Comparative Grammar of the Greek Language
C. K. Scott Moncrieff	United Kingdom	25 September 1889	28 February 1930	short story writer, satirist, translator, literary critic	Evensong and Morwe Song, The Strange and Striking Adventure of Four Authors in Search of a Character, 1926
D. H. Lawrence	United Kingdom	11 September 1885	2 March 1930	novelist, short story writer, poet, playwright, literary critic	Sons and Lovers, The Rainbow , Women in Love, Lady Chatterley's Lover
Alois Jirásek	Czechoslovakia	23 August 1851	12 March 1930	history teacher, historical novelist, playwright	Ancient Bohemian Legends, Mezi proudy (Between the Currents), Proti všem, The Philosophers' Story or Psohlavci
Mary Eleanor Wilkins Freeman	United States	31 October 1852	13 March 1930	short story writer, novelist, ghost story writer	A New England Nun, Pembroke, Collected Ghost Stories, co-writer of The Whole Family
Alfred Williams	United Kingdom	7 February 1877	10 April 1930	poet, prose writer, collector of folk song lyrics	Life in a Railway Factory, Songs in Wiltshire
Sigurd Ibsen	Norway	23 December 1859	14 April 1930	politician, Prime Minister of Norway in Stockholm, lawyer, political writer	Unionen, founder of the magazine Ringeren
Vladimir Mayakovsky	Russia	19 July 1893	14 April 1930	poet, playwright, poster artist, manifesto co-writer for Russian Futurism	A Cloud in Trousers, Backbone Flute, The Bedbug, The Bathhouse
John B. Sheridan	United States	22 January 1870	14 April 1930	sports journalist, whistleblower	regular writer of the sports column Back of Home Plate
Robert Bridges	United Kingdom	23 October 1844	21 April 1930	poet, Poet Laureate of the United Kingdom, playwright, hymn writer, literary critic, World War I propagandist for the War Propaganda Bureau	Milton's Prosody, Humdrum and Harum-Scarum, Eros and Psyche, The Feast of Bacchus, Achilles in Scyros, The Return of Ulysses, Demeter: A Mask, Prometheus the Firegiver: A Mask in the Greek Manner
Jeppe Aakjær	Denmark	10 November 1866	22 April 1930	novelist, playwright, poet, member of the Jutland Movement	Bondens Søn (The Peasant's Son), Vredens børn, et tyendes saga (Children of Wrath: A Hired Man's Saga),Arbejdets Glæde (The Joy of Work), Jens Langkniv, Rugens sange (Songs of the Rye), Heimdal's Wanderings
Maria Polydouri	Greece	1 April 1902	29 April 1930	poet, representative of Neo-romanticism, diarist, theatrical actress, dressmaker	The Pain of the Mother, The Chirps that faint, Echo over chaos
William John Locke	United Kingdom	20 March 1863	15 May 1930	short story writer, novelist, playwright	The Morals of Marcus Ordeyne, The Beloved Vagabond, The Glory of Clementina Wing, The Adventure of the Fickle Goddess
Florence Bell	United Kingdom	9 September 1851	16 May 1930	playwright	A Collection of Plays and Monologues for the Drawing Room, At the Works: Study of a Manufacturing Town, Middlesbrough, The Heart of Yorkshire, The Letters of Gertrude Bell Vol 1 and 2, Petit theâtre des enfants: twelve tiny french plays for children
Herbert Croly	United States	23 January 1869	17 May 1930	political philosopher, intellectual leader of the progressive movement, biographer	The Promise of American Life, Progressive Democracy, Marcus Alonso Hanna: His Life and Work, The Effect on American Institutions of a Powerful Military and Naval Establishment
Arthur St John Adcock	United Kingdom	17 January 1864	9 June 1930	novelist, poet, journalist, magazine editor, one of the "Cockney school novelists" who imitated Charles Dickens	East End Idylls, An unfinished martyrdom and other stories, In The Wake of the War, Songs of the War, The Luck of Private Foster: A Romance of Love and War, The World that Never Was. A London Fantasy, Australasia Triumphant! With the Australians and New Zealanders in the Great War on Land And Sea, For Remembrance. Soldier Poets who have Fallen in the War. With nineteen portraits
Herbert Warren	United Kingdom	21 October 1853	9 June 1930	academic, college president, college rugby football player, poet	By Severn Sea and Other Poems, The Death of Virgil
Israel Gollancz	United Kingdom	13 July 1863	23 June 1930	literary scholar, specialist on the works of William Shakespeare, college professor, translator	co-founder of the British Academy and director of the Early English Text Society, editor of the "Temple" Shakespeare collection of Shakespeare's works and of the anthology A Book of Homage to Shakespeare, article writer for the Dictionary of National Biography
Arthur Conan Doyle	United Kingdom	22 May 1859	7 July 1930	writer in the fields of crime fiction, detective fiction, fantasy, science fiction, and historical fiction	A Study in Scarlet, Micah Clarke, The Mystery of Cloomber, The Sign of the Four, The White Company, The Great Shadow,The Hound of the Baskervilles, The Lost World, The Land of Mist
Pavlos Karolidis	Greece	c. 1849	26 July 1930	historian, politician	Kappadokika, a historical and archaeological dissertation on Cappadocia, History of the 19th Century, Universal or World History, The Ethnic Ancestry of the Orthodox Christians of Syria and Palestine, Contemporary History
Lucien Wolf	United Kingdom	20 January 1857	23 August 1930	historian, diplomat, journalist	The Russian Conspiracy or Russian Monopoly in Opposition to Britain Interest in the East, Menasseh ben Israel’s Mission to Oliver Cromwell, The Myth of the Jewish Menace in World Affairs: The Truth about the Forged Protocols of the Elders of Zion, The Queen's Jewry 1837–1897
William Archibald Spooner	United Kingdom	22 July 1844	29 August 1930	cleric, university don, lecturer on ancient history, divinity and philosophy, specialist on the works of Aristotle	The Moral Philosophy Of Aristotle, Bishop Butler
Thomas Nicoll Hepburn	United Kingdom	21 April 1861	1 September 1930	novelist, biographer, poet, representative of the literary movement Kailyard school	The Child World, Barncraig: Episodes in the Life of a Scottish Village, Sunshine and Haar: Some Further Glimpses of Life at Barncraig, Robert Burns, The Skipper of Barncraig
Vladimir Arsenyev	Russia	10 November 1872	4 September 1930	explorer of the Far East, travel writer, memoirist	Po Ussuriyskomu krayu (Along the Ussuri land), Dersu Uzala, Skvoz taygu (Through the taiga)
Georges de Porto-Riche	France	20 May 1849	5 September 1930	dramatist, novelist, comedy writer	Le Vertige, Les Deux Fautes, La Chance de Françoise, L'Infidèle, Amoureuse, Le Passé, Les Malefilâtre
Karam Singh	British India	18 March 1884	18 September 1930	historian, poster artist, diarist	Banda Bahadur, Katak Ki Visakh, Jeevan Harnaam Kaur, Maharaja Ala Singh
Arthur Way	United Kingdom	13 February 1847	25 September 1930	classical scholar, translator	Homer, Greek through English, Sons of the Violet-Crowned, a Tale of Ancient Athens
Olena Pchilka	Ukraine	29 June 1849	4 October 1930	publisher, ethnographer, translator, collector of folk songs, newspaper editor	Ukrainian Folk Ornament, To Ukrainian Children, Thoughts of a Net, Tovaryshky
Roy Horniman	United Kingdom	31 July 1868	11 October 1930	playwright, novelist, short story writer, screenwriter, animal welfare and free speech activist	Israel Rank: The Autobiography of a Criminal, The Sin of Atlantis, The Living Buddha, A Nonconformist Parson, Lord Cammarleigh's Secret: A Fairy Story of To-Day
James Surtees Phillpotts	United Kingdom	18 July 1839	16 October 1930	educational writer, classics scholar	Stories from Herodotus in Attic Greek, King and Commonwealth: A History of Charles I and the Great Rebellion, Shakespeare's Tempest, Homer without a Lexicon for Beginners, Selections Adapted from Xenophon
William B. Hanna	United States	5 January 1866	20 November 1930	sports journalist	sports columns for various newspapers based in New York City, received posthumous recognition by the New York Baseball Writers Association
Jean-Marie-Raphaël Le Jeune	Canada	12 April 1855	21 November 1930	missionary, linguist, newspaper publisher	Practical Chinook vocabulary, Prayers in the Okanagan language, Polyglott manual of prayers, Chinook rudiments
Florbela Espanca	Portugal	8 December 1894	8 December 1930	poet	O livro D'ele (His book), Livro de Mágoas (The Book of Sorrows), Livro de Soror Saudade (Sister Saudade's Book), Charneca em Flor (Heath in Bloom)
Neil Munro	United Kingdom	3 June 1863	22 December 1930	historical novelist, short story writer, journalist, newspaper editor, literary critic	The New Road, John Splendid, Doom Castle, The Daft Days
Marion Manville Pope	United States	13 July 1859	22 December 1930	children's writer, poet	Over the divide and other verses, Up the matterhorn in a boat, Between two gods : [an allegory],

== Entered the public domain in countries with life + 50 years ==
In most countries of Africa and Asia, as well as Belarus, Bolivia, Canada, New Zealand, Egypt and Uruguay; a work enters the public domain 50 years after the creator's death.

Names	Country	Birth	Death	Occupation	Notable work
Edith Escombe	United Kingdom	1866	1950	memoirist, novelist, essayist	Bits I Remember, A Tale that is Told, Stucco and Speculation, Love's Ghost, Old Maids' Children, Phases of Marriage
Helen Rowland	United States	1875	1950	journalist, humorist	Reflections of a Bachelor Girl, The Rubáiyát of a Bachelor, A Guide To Men: Being Encore Reflections of a Bachelor Girl, The sayings of Mrs. Solomon: Being the confessions of the seven hundredth wife as revealed to Helen Rowland, If, A Chant for Wives also The White Woman's Burden
Cuthbert Whitaker	United Kingdom	26 May 1873	1950	almanack editor	editor of Whitaker's Almanack
Basil Williams	United Kingdom	4 April 1867	5 January 1950	historian	The Life of William Pitt, Earl of Chatham, Botha, Smuts and South Africa, The Whig Supremacy
Joseph Schumpeter	Austria	8 February 1883	8 January 1950	political economist	Capitalism, Socialism and Democracy, The theory of economic development: an inquiry into profits, capital, credit, interest, and the business cycle, Economic doctrine and method: an historical sketch, The sociology of imperialisms, Social classes in an ethnically homogeneous environment, Depressions: Can we learn from past experience?
George Orwell	United Kingdom	26 June 1903	21 January 1950	dystopian fiction writer, novelist, essayist, journalist, critic	Animal Farm, Nineteen Eighty-Four, The Road to Wigan Pier, Homage to Catalonia, Burmese Days
D. K. Broster	United Kingdom	2 September 1877	7 February 1950	historical novelist, horror fiction writer, short-story writer	The Flight of the Heron, "Mr. Rowl", Couching at the Door: Strange and Macabre Tales, Clairvoyance, Juggernaut, The Pestering
Rafael Sabatini	United Kingdom	29 April 1875	13 February 1950	romance and adventure novelist, short story writer, playwright	The Sea Hawk, Scaramouche, Captain Blood, Bellarion the Fortunate
Irving Bacheller	United States	26 September 1859	24 February 1950	novelist, journalist	Eben Holden, The Master of Silence, Still House of O'Darrow, The Light in the Clearing, A Man for the Ages, The Master of Chaos
Alberto Gerchunoff	Argentina	1 January 1883	2 March 1950	novelist, journalist	The Jewish Gauchos, Héroes de los Intersticios, Historias y proezas de amor, Los amores de Baruj Spinoza, El hombre importante, La clínica del doctor Mefistófeles; moderna milagrería en diez jornadas, Retorno a Don Quijote
Edgar Lee Masters	United States	23 August 1868	5 March 1950	novelist, dramatist, biographer, poet	Spoon River Anthology, To-morrow is My Birthday, Across Spoon River: An Autobiography, Lincoln: The Man, Mark Twain: A Portrait, The Blood of the Prophets, The Fate of the Jury: An Epilogue to Domesday Book, The Tide of Time
Heinrich Mann	Germany	27 March 1871	11 March 1950	novelist	Der Untertan, Professor Unrat, Die Jugend des Königs Henri Quatre, Die Vollendung des Königs Henri Quatre
Edgar Rice Burroughs	United States	1 September 1875	19 March 1950	writer in the genres of adventure fiction, science fiction, and fantasy	A Princess of Mars, Thuvia, Maid of Mars, Llana of Gathol, Tarzan and the Lost Empire, Tarzan and the Jewels of Opar, Land of Terror, The Land That Time Forgot
Emmanuel Mounier	France	1 April 1905	22 March 1950	philosopher, theologian, representative of personalism	Révolution personnaliste et communautaire, De la propriété capitaliste à la propriété humaine, Manifeste au service du personnalisme, Pacifistes ou Bellicistes, L'éveil de l'Afrique noire
Henric Streitman	Romania	16 February 1870	c. 30 March 1950	politician, journalist, translator	Între da și nu (Between Yes and No), Mi se pare că... (Signs Point to...)
F. O. Matthiessen	United States	19 February 1902	1 April 1950	educator, scholar, and literary critic	American Renaissance: Art and Expression in the Age of Emerson and Whitman, Translation: An Elizabethan Art, From the Heart of Europe, The Education of a Socialist, The James Family: A Group Biography
Albert Ehrenstein	Germany	23 December 1886	8 April 1950	novelist, expressionist poet, translator, anti-war activist	Wanderers song, The man screams, Murderer from Justice, Räuber und Soldaten. Roman frei nach dem Chinesischen
H. Bonciu	Romania	19 May 1893	27 April 1950	erotica writer, novelist, poet, journalist and translator, representative of Neo-romanticism and Surrealism, winemaker	Lada cu năluci (A Crate of Apparitions), Eu și Orientul. Douăzeci și cinci de sonete (I and the Orient. Twenty-five Sonnets), Strania, dubla existență a unui om în patru labe (The Strange Double Life of a Man on His All Fours), Pensiunea doamnei Pipersberg (Mrs. Pipersberg's Boarding House)
Agnes Smedley	United States	23 February 1892	6 May 1950	journalist, novelist, political activist for both the Indian independence movement and the Chinese Communist Revolution	Daughter of Earth, Chinese Destinies, China's Red Army Marches, China Fights Back, Battle Hymn of China, and The Great Road: The Life and Times of Chu Teh
Cezaro Rossetti	United Kingdom	1901	8 May 1950	novelist	Kredu min, sinjorino! (Believe me, Ma'am!)
Belle da Costa Greene	United States	26 November 1879	10 May 1950	librarian, first director of the Pierpont Morgan Library, letter writer	Her professional correspondence survives in the collections of The Morgan Library & Museum.
Alfred O. Andersson	United States	10 December 1874	11 May 1950	newspaper publisher, journalist, newspaper editor	publisher of the Dallas Dispatch, co-founder of the Houston Press, editor of the Memphis Press, general manager of the Newspaper Enterprise Association
George Cecil Ives	United Kingdom	1 October 1867	4 June 1950	poet, political activist for prison reform campaigner and gay rights	Penal Methods in the Middle Ages, A History of Penal Methods: Criminals, Witches, Lunatics, The Sexes, Structure, & "Extra-organic" Habits of certain Animals, English Prisons Today, Graeco-Roman View of Youth, The Missing Baronet
Katharine Glasier	United Kingdom	25 September 1867	14 June 1950	socialist politician, novelist, journalist, educator	Husband and Brother, Aimee Furniss, Scholar, Marget, Tales from the Derbyshire Hills
Guy Gilpatric	United States	21 January 1896	7 July 1950	pilot, flight instructor, short-story writer and novelist	Flying Stories, Action in the North Atlantic, Brownstone Front, French Summer, The Compleat Goggler
Cesare Pavese	Italy	9 September 1908	27 August 1950	novelist, short story writer, translator, literary critic	The Beautiful Summer, The Moon and the Bonfires, Lavorare stanca (Hard Labor), Il Compagno (The Comrade), Dialoghi con Leucò (The Leucothea Dialogues), Il diavolo sulle colline (The Devil in the Hills)
Olaf Stapledon	United Kingdom	10 May 1886	6 September 1950	philosopher, science fiction writer, anti-apartheid activist	Last and First Men, Last Men in London, Star Maker, Sirius
Henrik Rytter	Norway	18 January 1877	18 September 1950	dramatist, lyricist, and translator.	Dømde,Bråhamaren, Herman Ravn, Våren, Elva, Prestegarden og øya
Nicolai Hartmann	Germany	20 February 1882	9 October 1950	philosopher, metaphysician, representative of critical realism	Das Seinsproblem in der griechischen Philosophie vor Plato (The Problem of Being in Greek Philosophy Before Plato), Platos Logik des Seins (The Logic of Being in Plato), Des Proklus Diadochus philosophische Anfangsgründe der Mathematik (Proclus Diadochus' Philosophical Elements of Mathematics), Die philosophischen Grundfragen der Biologie (The Philosophical Foundations of Biology)
Edna St. Vincent Millay	United States	22 February 1892	19 October 1950	lyrical poet, playwright, feminist, the first woman to win the Pulitzer Prize for Poetry	Renascence, Aria da Capo, The Lamp and the Bell, A Few Figs From Thistles
Herbert Kelly	United Kingdom	18 July 1860	31 October 1950	English Anglican priest and theologian	The Moral and Metaphysical Philosophy, The Kingdom of Christ, An Idea In the Working: An Account of the Society of the Sacred Mission, its History and Aims, A History of the Church of Christ, No Pious Person: Autobiographical Recollections By Herbert Kelly
George Bernard Shaw	Ireland	26 July 1856	2 November 1950	playwright, satirist, polemicist, political activist	Man and Superman, Pygmalion, Saint Joan, Arms and the Man, Major Barbara, The Doctor's Dilemma, Caesar and Cleopatra
Johannes V. Jensen	Denmark	20 January 1873	25 November 1950	pulp fiction writer, historical novelist	The Fall of the King, The Long Journey, Danskere, Einar Elkjær, Himmerland Stories
Xavier Villaurrutia	Mexico	27 March 1903	25 December 1950	novelist, playwright, poet, translator, literary critic	Dama de corazones (Lady of hearts), Nostalgia de la muerte (Nostalgia of death), Décima muerte (Tenth death), Invitación à la muerte (Invitation to the death)
Sigizmund Krzhizhanovsky	Russia	11 February 1887	28 December 1950	playwright, philosopher, historian, essayist	The Smoke-Colored Goblet, Fairy-tales for Wunderkinder, Someone Else's Theme, What Men Die By, Unbitten Elbow, One Smaller Than the Other, Postmark: Moscow

== Entering the public domain in the United States ==
In the United States, the copyright status of works extends for the life of the author or artists, plus 70 years. If the work is owned by a corporation, then the copyright extends 95 years.

Due to the passing of the Copyright Term Extension Act (Sonny Bono Copyright Term Extension Act) in 1998, no new works would enter the public domain in this jurisdiction until 2019.

== See also ==
- 1900 in literature, 1930 in literature and 1950 in literature for deaths of writers
- Public Domain Day
- Creative Commons
