= China's Red Army Marches =

- Author: Agnes Smedley
- Language: English
- Genre: War journalism
- Publisher: Vanguard Press (1934)
- Publication date: 1934
- Publication place: China
- Media type: Print (book)
- Pages: 311
- ISBN: 0-88355-390-2

China's Red Army Marches (1934) is a book of reportage by American radical journalist Agnes Smedley on the Soviet Zone, later the Chinese Soviet Republic in Jiangxi from 1928 to 1931, It describes a stage in the Chinese Communist Revolution after the break-up of the First United Front with the Chinese Nationalist Party and before the Long March of 1934–1935, a stage in which the party followed a radical land and class policy. The book deals with events up to 1931 and cannot anticipate the destruction of the Jiangxi Soviet and the subsequent Long March. It does have detailed accounts of the words and actions of Zhu De (Chu Teh), Peng Dehuai (Peng Teh-huaii) and Mao Zedong, whose name is transcribed as 'Mau Tse-tung'. It includes a full speech by Mao and some shorter remarks, perhaps the first time his words had appeared in English.

One biographer described the book as pioneering "a new form of socially conscious art that considerably influenced leftist reportage in the 1930s", because "she spoke of individuals experiences, but she meant her readers to view the people about whom she wrote as representatives of a larger group who chose the mass actions linked to China's emerging Communist movement as an alternative to their despair.

The book was also published in the Soviet Union as Red Flood Over China. This is one of five books written by Smedley about her experiences in China: Chinese Destinies (1933); China's Red Army Marches (1934); China Fights Back: An American Woman With the Eighth Route Army (1938); Battle Hymn of China (1943);The Great Road: The Life and Times of Chu Teh (1956).

== Synopsis ==
The book gives a detailed account of the Chinese Soviet Republic in Jiangxi from 1928 to 1931, ending with the proclamation of the Soviet Republic of China in 1931. Smedley provides detailed accounts of early CCP policies, including land-reform policies that were more extreme than those followed after the Long March, and campaigns to mobilize poor peasants and give rights to women. She includes many accounts of battles, including the capture and subsequent loss of Changsha. The book has many details including an account of the Anti-Bolshevik League.

Neither Smedley nor any other Western reporter visited Chinese Soviet, but she had first-hand accounts from Chinese Communist fighters whom she covertly sheltered in Shanghai. Her main sources were two Red Army commanders, Zhou Jianping and Chen Geng. It is strongly favorable to the Chinese Communists and hostile to the Kuomintang.

== Illustrations ==
A 1934 advertisement in The New Masses magazine has an illustration of the book cover by Pulitzer Prize-winning artist and cartoonist Jacob Burck.

== Reviews ==
In the review in The Outlook magazine, Robert Cantwell praised Smedley for her "pioneering work." He recommended the book to readers of Man's Fate by Andre Malreaux, because "it continues the story of the Chinese Revolution where Malraux leaves off." He considered it "an important contribution to a subject about which very little has been known."

Alfred H. Holt in The Saturday Review called the book "a spirited chronicle of what was happening in Soviet China during the years 1928-1931" and recommended it "to all who possess sufficient tolerance to read an informal history that makes no pretense at impartiality". Of particular interest, he felt was the great majority of Chinese communist revolutionists were "ignorant peasants from the interior".

Other reviews of the book include Malcolm Cowley in The New Republic, Thomas Steep in The American Mercury, Gertrude Diamond in The Partisan Review, Harold M. Vinacke in American Political Science Review, T.A. Bisson in The Nation, and Nathaniel Peffer in Pacific Affairs.

== Impact ==
This book and her Chinese Destinies covertly circulated in Nationalist-ruled China, both in English and in Chinese translations. It was one of only three foreign publications to be formally banned by the Nationalist government. Smedley had long been identified by them as a major foe, and they falsely claimed that she had brought cases of whisky to the Jiangxi Soviet base and had stood nude before a mass rally, singing the Internationale.
