= "Mr. Rowl" =

1924 novel by D. K. Broster

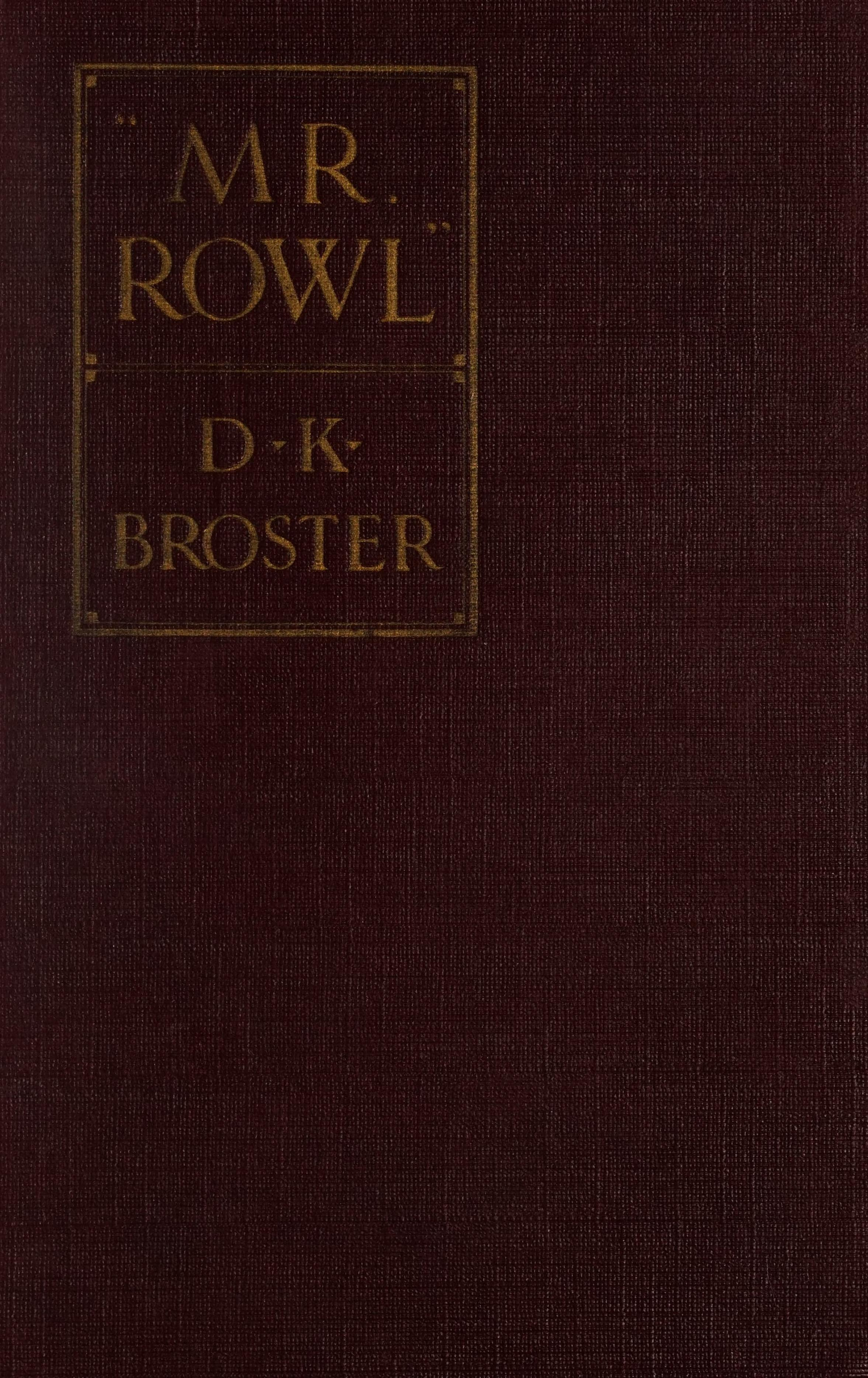
- Cover of first American edition
- Author: D. K. Broster
- Genre: Romance novel
- Publisher: William Heinemann Ltd, London
- Publication date: 1924
- Text: "Mr. Rowl" at Internet Archive

"Mr. Rowl", written by D. K. Broster and published in 1924, is a historical romance novel set in England during the Napoleonic Wars. Captain Raoul des Sablières is a French prisoner of war who is unjustly sent to the Plymouth hulks (Prison ship). He escapes and is befriended by a Royal Navy captain, Hervey Barrington, who helps reunite him with the young Englishwoman he loves, and with his repatriation to France.

In the novel, the main character manages to escape prison by cross-dressing as a woman. While he is French, he is passing as a Spanish woman while traveling in England. He meets an English captain who invites the "lady" to spend the night at his house.

== Plot summary ==
Monsieur Raoul des Sablières, or "Mr. Rowl" as he is known by the 'shop people and such', was wounded and captured at the Battle of Salamanca in 1812. He is on 'parole of honour' in England where he meets and falls in love with the Honourable Miss Juliana Forrest, Lord Fulgrave's daughter. Due to the machinations of Juliana's jealous fiancé, Raoul is considered to have broken his parole and is sent to the prison camp at Norman's Cross. He is persuaded to attempt to escape from the camp, during which a guard is seriously injured and Raoul is unjustly blamed for it. He is therefore sent to a prison ship in Plymouth, from which he escapes while cross-dressing as a woman, with the help of money from Juliana.

The road on which Raoul (disguised as a Spanish lady to account for his accent) is travelling, becomes blocked by a fallen tree and a fellow passenger, Captain Hervey Barrington - currently without a ship and on half-pay - offers his assistance and invites Raoul to spend the night at his nearby house. Here, Hervey's sister Lavinia discovers Raoul's secret and Hervey locks Raoul in the spare bedroom for the night, intending to turning him over to the authorities in the morning. During the night, Raoul escapes from the bedroom window.

A few days later, when Hervey is out sailing, he rescues a man who has been chased into the sea by some locals. It is Raoul who, half-starved and ill, has also broken his wrist when Hervey's guttering gave way in his escape. Realising Raoul is in no condition to be taken to the local gaol, Hervey lies to the sergeant and declares that Raoul drowned.

Raoul recovers from a near-fatal illness and a friendship develops between the effervescent Raoul and the reserved Hervey. To atone for the guilt he feels for Raoul's suffering, Hervey reunites him with Juliana and, learning that Raoul had saved the life of an English officer in Spain, Lord Fulgrave becomes involved in arranging Raoul's repatriation to France. Hervey's stalled career as a naval officer is meanwhile rescued by his official report of Raoul's drowning having attracted the attention of the Admiralty - he had simply been forgotten.

As with D. K. Broster's most successful novel The Flight of the Heron (1925), and The Wounded Name, published 1922, the focus of the novel, despite the female love interest, is the close friendship which develops between two very different men. In each case, the more reserved of the men finds that their relationship with the other supplies the ability to love and develop a friendship which they lack.

== Review ==
"... a wholly charming romance ... A French prisoner of war in England seems to present material for pity, for fun, for excitement. Miss Broster uses all these elements in her story ... but it is a romance as delicately finished as a piece of Dresden china." Westminster Gazette
