= The War and the World =

1916 poem by Vladimir Mayakovsky

- 1924 edition
- Author: Vladimir Mayakovsky
- Original title: Война и мiр
- Language: Russian
- Genre: Poem
- Publication date: 1917
- Publication place: Soviet Russia
- Media type: Print (hardback & paperback)
- Preceded by: Backbone Flute (1916)
- Followed by: The Man (1918)

The War and the World (Война и мир) is a poem by Vladimir Mayakovsky written in 1916 and first published in 1917 by Maxim Gorky-led Parus Publishers, originally under the title Война и мiр.

The name of the poem is a wordplay on Leo Tolstoy's War and Peace. In the pre-1918 Russian мiр meant "the world," "the Universe," as opposed to мир, "peace". In the modern Russian, the words are full homonyms.

== Background ==
In early September 1915 Mayakovsky joined the Petrograd military driving automobile driving school. The patriotic enthusiasm he experienced at the outset of the war now waned, he was quite unwilling to go to the frontline. "Shaven me up [for the service]. But now I don't want to go to the front anymore. Pose as a draftsman. Take nightly lessons from an engineer who teaches me to draw the autos. With publications it's even worse. Soldiers are forbidden to [get published]," he wrote in I, Myself.

It was while studying at the school that he started The War and the World which was finished in the course of 1916. While working upon the poem Mayakovsky often visited Gorky, recited new fragments and, apparently, received advice.

== History ==
In the end of 1915, having finished Part 3 of the poem, Mayakovsky read it in the offices of Letopis magazine, with Gorky present. Approved for the publication by the staff meeting, it was banned by the Russian military censorship committee. In No.9 issue of the magazine it was marked as one of the works which "cannot be published for reasons… the editorial staff has no influence over." Public renditions of the poem were also banned.

Mayakovsky started publishing The War and the World in parts, in Letopis (The Prologue, Part 5, 1917, Petrograd), Desert Miracle almanac (Part 4, Odessa, 1917), Novaya Zhyzn newspaper (Part 3, 1917). For the first time the poem was published as a whole in the late 1917 by Parus Publishers, later to be included into Vladimir Mayakovsky's Collected Works, 1909-1919.

Gorky was the poem's most ardent champion who admired the anti-war pathos, but also its in-your-face language, totally devoid of subtlety ("like telegraph posts playing upon your nerves," as he put it). The Futurists received the poem negatively and accused the author of having torn with all the basic principles of the movement, apparently under Gorky's influence. Later Soviet literary historians eagerly explored this line, finding the two authors' rhetoric at the time in many ways similar. At least, Vladimir has seen what many has not experience in wars, though they may have experienced, none has shared the light in utmost reality as the poet does. Many who have not seen war will drum for war, truly, not every wars share equally peace. Education on the other side is the light the can defeats the ignorance the in war.
