= China Fights Back =

Book by Agnes Smedley about Communist forces in the Sino-Japanese War

China Fights Back: An American Woman With the Eighth Route Army
- Title page for China Fights Back: An American Woman With the Eighth Route Army (1938)
- Author: Agnes Smedley
- Language: English
- Genre: Memoir
- Publication date: 1938

China Fights Back: An American Woman With the Eighth Route Army was a 1938 book by Agnes Smedley. It was a diary of her time with the Chinese Communist Eighth Route Army in the early stages of the Second Sino-Japanese War.

Released in the United States and Great Britain, it was much less successful than her earlier China books. Smedley included some of the same material in a later book, Battle Hymn of China, which did much better.
