= Chinese Destinies =

1933 essay collection by Agnes Smedley

- Author: Agnes Smedley
- Language: English
- Subject: China
- Genre: Non-fiction
- Publisher: Vanguard Press
- Publication date: 1933
- Pages: 315

Chinese Destinies (1933) is a collection of essays about China and Chinese lives by Agnes Smedley, a left-wing journalist. Along with another book called China's Red Army Marches, it was covertly circulated in Kuomintang-ruled China, both in English and in Chinese translations.
