= D. K. Broster =

English novelist and short writer (1877-1950)

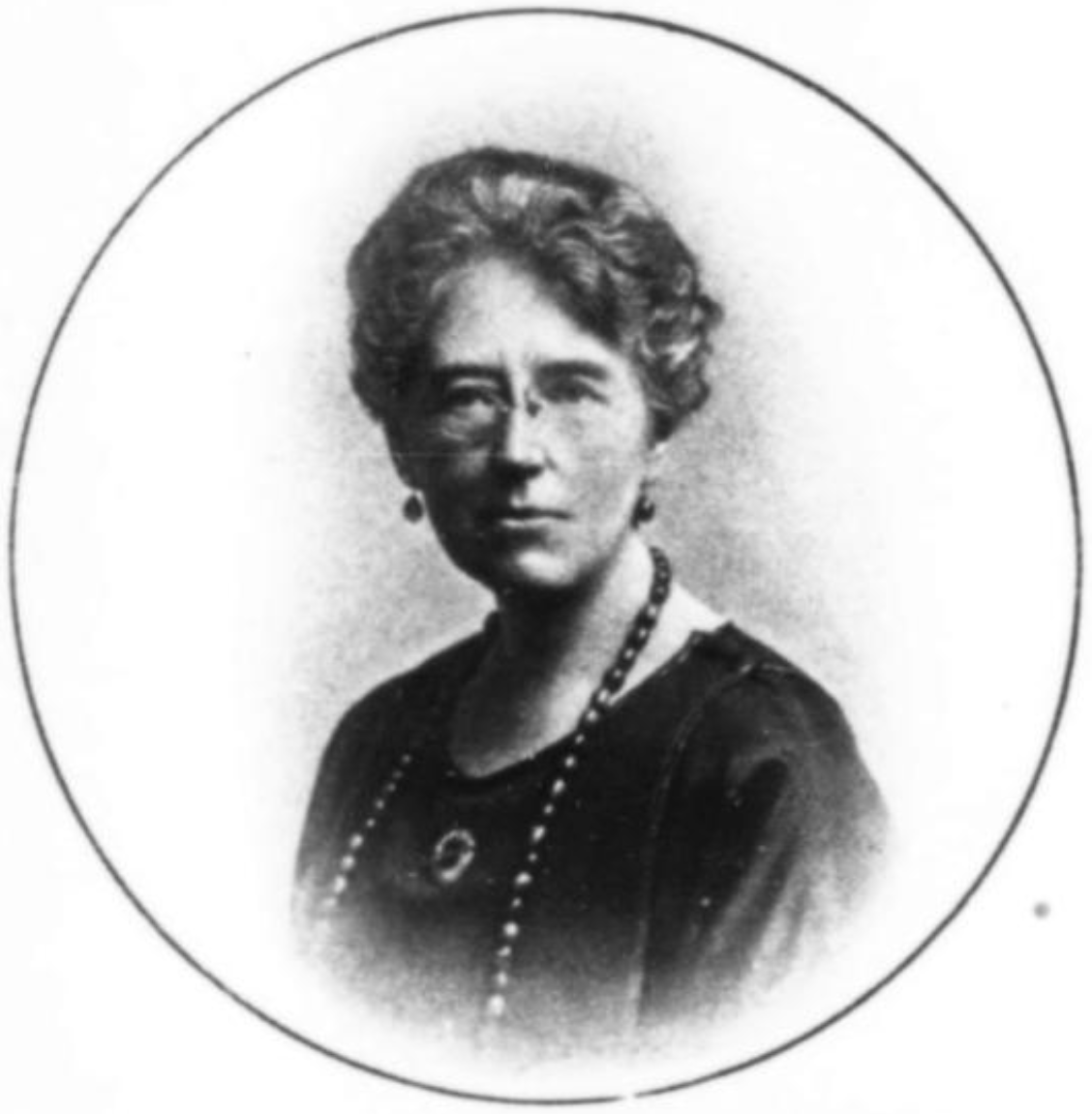
- D. K. Broster in about 1924
- Born: 2 September 1877; Grassendale, Liverpool, England
- Died: 7 February 1950 (aged 72); Bexhill, East Sussex, England
- Education: St Hilda's College, Oxford
- Occupation: Writer
- Partner: Gertrude Schlich
- Writing career
- Genres: Historical fiction; Horror fiction; weird fiction
- Notable work: The Flight of the Heron

Dorothy Kathleen Broster (2 September 1877 – 7 February 1950), usually known as D. K. Broster, was an English novelist and short-story writer. Her fiction consists mainly of historical romances set in the 18th or early 19th centuries. Her best known novel is The Flight of the Heron (1925), set during the Jacobite rising of 1745. Broster's horror fiction stories depict haunted artists, psychic girls, haunted chairs, and supernatural entities tormenting living humans. In 2022, several of her weird fiction stories were reprinted in the collection From the Abyss: Weird Fiction, 1907 - 1945

Broster avoided publicity during her lifetime. While she was an Englishwoman from Liverpool, many of her readers wrongly assumed that she was a male writer from Scotland.

== Biography ==
Dorothy Kathleen Broster was born on 2 September 1877, to Thomas Mawdsley Broster and Emilie Kathleen Gething, at Devon Lodge (now Monksferry House) in Grassendale Park, Garston, Liverpool, on the banks of the Mersey. "And to this she probably owed her life-long interest in the sea." When she was 16, the family moved to Cheltenham, where she attended Cheltenham Ladies' College. From 1896 to 1898 she read history at St Hilda's College, Oxford, where she was one of the first students, although at this date women were not awarded degrees.

Broster served as secretary to Charles Harding Firth, (Regius Professor of History from 1904 to 1925) for several years, and collaborated on several of his works. Her first two novels were co-written with a college friend, Gertrude Winifred Taylor: Chantemerle: A Romance of the Vendean War (1911) and The Vision Splendid (1913) (about the Tractarian Movement).

During the First World War she served as a Red Cross nurse with a voluntary Franco-American hospital, but she returned to England with a knee infection in 1916. After the war, she and a friend, Gertrude Schlich (daughter of Wilhelm Philipp Daniel Schlich, first professor of forestry at Oxford), moved near to Battle, East Sussex, where Broster worked full-time as a writer. She was in the first batch of women to receive her Bachelor of Arts and Master of Arts in 1920 at Oxford.

The Yellow Poppy (1920), about the adventures of an aristocratic couple during the French Revolution, was later adapted by Broster and W. Edward Stirling for the London stage in 1922. She produced her bestseller about Scottish history, The Flight of the Heron, in 1925. Broster stated she had consulted eighty reference books before beginning the novel. She followed it up with two successful sequels, The Gleam in the North and The Dark Mile. She wrote several other historical novels, much reprinted in their day, although this Jacobite trilogy, inspired by a five-week visit to friends in Scotland and featuring the dashing Ewen Cameron as hero, remains the best known.

During her career, Broster wrote several poems, articles and, notably, short stories, which were collected in A Fire of Driftwood and Couching at the Door. The title story of Couching at the Door involves an artist haunted by a mysterious entity. Other supernatural tales include "Clairvoyance", (1932) about a psychic girl, "Juggernaut" (1935) about a haunted chair, and "The Pestering", (1932) focusing on a couple tormented by a supernatural entity. In 2022, a collection of eleven stories entitled From the Abyss was published by Handheld Press (Bath UK), edited by Melissa Edmundson.

Broster avoided personal publicity. During her lifetime, many of her readers wrongly assumed she was both male and Scottish. She died in Bexhill Hospital on 7 February 1950, aged 73.

== Critical reception ==
Literary historian Jack Adrian describes Couching at the Door as "a pure masterwork, one of the most satisfying weird collections of the century". The poet Patricia Beer was an admirer of Broster's novels, stating she had been fascinated by The Flight of the Heron when she read it aged thirteen.

== Media adaptations ==
The Flight of the Heron was adapted for BBC Radio twice, in 1944 (starring Gordon Jackson as Ewen Cameron) and again in 1959, starring (Bryden Murdoch as Cameron). Murdoch also starred in radio adaptations of the book's sequels, The Gleam in the North and The Dark Mile.

The supernatural tale "The Pestering" was also adapted for radio. The Flight of the Heron was serialized on TV twice: by Scottish Television in eight episodes in 1968, and by the BBC in 1976, which starred David Rintoul as Ewen Cameron and Tom Chadbon as Keith Windham.

== Bibliography ==
=== Novels ===
- Chantemerle: A Romance of the Vendean War (1911) (with G. W. Taylor)
- The Vision Splendid (1913) (with G. W. Taylor)
- Sir Isumbras at the Ford (1918)
- The Yellow Poppy (1920)
- The Wounded Name (1922)
- "Mr. Rowl" (1924)
- The Flight of the Heron (1925)
- The Gleam in the North (1927)
- The Dark Mile (1929)
- Ships in the Bay! (1931)
- Almond, Wild Almond (1933)
- World under Snow (1935) (with G. Forester)
- Child Royal (1937)
- The Sea without a Haven (1941)
- The Captain's Lady (1947)

=== Collections ===
- A Fire of Driftwood (1932)
- Couching at the Door: Strange and Macabre Tales (1942)
- From the Abyss: Weird Fiction, 1907 - 1945 (2022)

=== Poetry ===
- The Short Voyage (1951)

=== Non-fiction ===
- The Happy Warrior: A. A. C. de Brunet, Count de Neuilly (1926)

=== Omnibus editions ===
- A Jacobite Trilogy (1984) (incorporating The Flight of the Heron, The Gleam in the North and The Dark Mile)

== Sources ==
- Tuck, Donald H. (1974). The Encyclopedia of Science Fiction and Fantasy. Chicago: Advent. p. 67. ISBN 0-911682-20-1.
- D.K. Broster: An Appreciation by Belinda Copson
