= Alfred O. Andersson =

American newspaper publisher (1874–1950)

Alfred Oscar Andersson (December 10, 1874, Liverpool–May 11, 1950, La Jolla, California) was the publisher of the Dallas Dispatch and, briefly, of the Dallas Dispatch-Journal, daily afternoon newspapers of general circulation published in Dallas, Texas.

Andersson was the son an English cotton broker, and he lived with his expatriate family in Kansas City, Missouri during the early 1880s. Following his father's death, Andersson lived for 2 years in his native Liverpool and for 5 years in the German city of Weimar. When his mother remarried in 1889, he returned with his family to Kansas City. His stepfather published a German-language newspaper in Kansas, and Andersson worked at odd jobs for the newspaper during his teens. After serving as a writer and editor for campus publications at Princeton University, Andersson started a professional career as a journalist and editor. His first major assignment was covering the Spanish–American War from Cuba and Puerto Rico for the United Press.

Working primarily for Scripps-McRae, Andersson variously served as the publisher of the Dallas Dispatch, a co-founder of the Houston Press, an editor of the Memphis Press, and the general manager of the Newspaper Enterprise Association. He attempted to retire in 1921, but he resumed his publishing duties in 1922. He retired as the publisher of the Dispatch in 1937, but he became its co-owner in 1938. Combining the newspaper with the Dallas Journal under the title Dallas Dispatch-Journal, he reluctantly served as its publisher. He permanently retired in December 1938.

== Growing up and career ==
Andersson was born in Liverpool, England, on December 10, 1874, to Alfred Carolus Andersson (1840–1882), a cotton broker, and Elizabeth Ann Falk (maiden; 1851–1931). The family moved to Kansas City, Missouri, in the early 1880s. Andersson's father died there, and his mother moved the family back to Liverpool, and then, in 1884, to Weimar, Germany, where Andersson attended school for five years. His mother re-married in 1889 to Dr. Henry John Lampe (1844–1910) and the family returned to Kansas City. She died in San Antonio, Texas, in 1931 at age seventy-nine. Lampe died in Kansas City.

Andersson's career in newspapers began during his teenage years when he worked at odd jobs around the shop where his stepfather published a German-language newspaper. He wrote and edited campus publications while a student at Princeton University from 1893 to 1895 and then returned to Kansas City to take a job on the Kansas City World, a Scripps-McRae newspaper. He then moved on to reporting and editing jobs on Scripps papers in St. Louis, Missouri and Chicago, Illinois.

In 1898 Andersson reported on the Spanish–American War from Cuba and Puerto Rico for the United Press, which then appointed him manager of the UP's Kansas City bureau. In 1906 he scouted Texas for a suitable location to start a newspaper for Scripps-McRae. According to newspaper lore, he stopped at a downtown Dallas drugstore, noticed it sold fine cigars, and concluded "if those are the cigars the men here favor, this must be a good town." As he contemplated starting a paper in Dallas he learned that another man was in town with the same idea and likewise with Scripps-McRae's tentative promise to back it. Confronting Col. Milton A. McRae, he was told that Scripps-McRae's support would go to the man who got a paper on the street first; Andersson then hastily threw together the four-page first issue of the Dallas Dispatch, deployed boys to sell the paper on the street, and the Dispatch became the Scripps paper in Dallas.

In 1911, he inaugurated the Houston Press, a Scripps-McRae newspaper in Houston, Texas. While editing the Press he retained editorship of the Dispatch and continued to live in Dallas. With a 1916 reorganization of Scripps-McRae properties in the Southern United States, he became editor of the Memphis Press in Memphis, Tennessee, the Denver Express in Denver, Colorado, and the Oklahoma News in Oklahoma City, Oklahoma.

In 1919, Andersson moved to Cleveland, Ohio, to become general manager of the Newspaper Enterprise Association, a Scripps feature service. In 1921, he left the newspaper business for the first time and moved to San Antonio to enter the cotton business. His absence from newspapering was short-lived, as he returned to Dallas a year later and once again became publisher of the Dispatch, a position he held until retirement in 1937. But a year later Karl Hoblitzelle and others purchased the Dispatch and combined it with the Dallas Journal (which they simultaneously acquired from A. H. Belo Corporation, publisher of The Dallas Morning News) to create the afternoon Dallas Dispatch-Journal, and induced the reluctant Andersson to become its publisher. Andersson finally retired in December 1938.

Andersson was tall and spare and had a reserved manner and patrician features. He was described as "essentially a kind man, although his was not the heartiness associated with the back-slapper." His newspapers tended to be crusading and somewhat sensational, often publishing several editions daily.

== Family ==
Andersson, on June 18, 1900, in Chicago, married Dorothy Winnifred Smart (maiden; 1876–1911). Two years later, on June 13, 1913, in Cincinnati, he married Ruth Holmes Harper (1890–1974), whose father, Jacob Chandler Harper (1858–1939), was general counsel for the Scripps-McRae newspapers.

== Death ==
Suffering from gradual circulatory failure and failure to completely recover from bronchial pneumonia, Andersson was stricken on a cruise and returned to the La Jolla, California, home of his wife's deceased parents, which the Anderssons had been using as a summer home and where he died on May 11, 1950, at age seventy-five. He had three children, one of whom, a son, was editor of the Memphis Press-Scimitar.

== Notes and references ==
=== References ===
- Crain, William H. (n.d.). "Hoblitzelle, Karl St. John (1879–1967)". Handbook of Texas (online). Texas State Historical Association – via University of North Texas.
- "New Afternoon Paper – First Issue of the Dallas Dispatch Makes Its Appearance". Dallas Morning News. Vol. 11, no. 352. September 18, 1906 – via GenealogyBank.com.
- "Dallas Publishers' Mother Dies Suddenly While at Tea". Dallas Morning News. Vol. 46, no. 123. January 31, 1931 – via GenealogyBank.com.
- "Former Publisher Lauded at Dinner". Dallas Morning News. Vol. 52, no. 155. March 4, 1937 – via GenealogyBank.com.
- "Journal, Dispatch Merge; New Paper to Start July 1". Dallas Morning News. Vol. 53, no. 264. June 21, 1938 – via GenealogyBank.com.
- "A. O. Andersson Quits as Head of Newspaper". Dallas Morning News. Vol. 54, no. 86. December 25, 1938 – via GenealogyBank.com.
- "Death Claims Newspaperman of Noted Chain [J.C. Harper]". Dallas Morning News. Vol. 54, no. 244. June 1, 1939 – via GenealogyBank.com.
- "Alfred Andersson Dies; Published Old Dispatch". Dallas Morning News. Vol. 65, no. 224. May 12, 1950 – via GenealogyBank.com.
- Frank, Ed. "Memphis Press-Scimitar" (archived). The Tennessee Encyclopedia of History and Culture. Archived from the original on October 2, 2008 – via WebCite.
- "Houston Press". Handbook of Texas (online). Texas State Historical Association. n.d. – via University of North Texas.
- The WPA Dallas Guide and History. University of North Texas Press. 1992. ISBN 0-929398-31-9.
- "Scripps – Our History – The Early Years: 1878–1934". Archived from the original on May 10, 2006.
