= Daughter of Earth =

Autobiography by Agnes Smedley

- Cover of 1987 Edition Published by the Feminist Press
- Author: Agnes Smedley
- Language: English
- Genre: Autobiographical novel, proletarian literature, feminist literature
- Publisher: Virago Press; Coward-McCann; The Feminist Press
- Publication date: 1929; 1935; 1973 & 1987
- Publication place: United States
- Media type: Print (Hardback & Paperback)
- Pages: 228 pp
- ISBN: 0-86068-003-7
- OCLC: 3551003

Daughter of Earth (1929) is an autobiographical novel by the American author and journalist Agnes Smedley. The novel chronicles the years of Marie Rogers's tumultuous childhood, struggles in relationships with men (both physical and emotional), time working with the Socialist Party, and involvement in the Indian independence movement.

== Plot ==
The novel begins in the 1890s with the Rogers family farming in Missouri. Though they are poor, Marie is unaware of this and enjoys her childhood for the most part. She does suffer physical abuse at the hands of her mother (Elly) who believes that Marie lies. Marie's parents’ marriage is not a happy one; Marie's father wishes to make more money by leaving the farm and moves the reluctant family in order to obtain work cutting wood. The family bounces back and forth between John Rogers's temporary jobs and life on the farm.

Marie's Aunt Helen comes to live with the family and works doing laundry for wealthy women. As a working woman, she is respected on the same level as John Rogers. Marie attends school regularly and becomes one of the smartest in her class. When she attends the birthday party of one of the wealthier students, Marie is made aware of class difference. She sees that not everyone lives as she does, and she is humiliated.

When John discovers Aunt Helen is working as a prostitute he kicks her out of the house. Elly and Marie are left to support the family when John leaves them again. Marie begins stealing to keep the family fed and clothed.

John Rogers returns and the family moves to a mining camp. Annie, Marie's older sister, marries at the age of sixteen. Her husband is the former beau of Aunt Helen. Annie dies only a few years after this. Jim, one of the men who works for John, proposes marriage to Marie and she accepts. Marie is fifteen. John and Elly explain the implications of marriage to Marie, and she breaks off the engagement. Due to financial troubles, the family continues to move for work.

As a teenager, Marie becomes a teacher and moves to New Mexico. A pen pal relationship begins between Marie and Robert Hampton. Marie admires him for his education and the success middle-class status affords him. Marie leaves her second teaching job when she discovers her mother is deathly ill and goes home to be with her as she dies.

As a traveling subscription saleswoman, Marie discovers her father and siblings living in squalor. She spends what money she has feeding and clothing the children and leaves. Marie ends up in New Mexico with no money. While starving to death in a hotel, she learns two men have raped a woman they mistook for Marie, believing Marie to be a prostitute. The bartender, one of the rapists, nurses Marie back to health. When he finds out that she is a virgin and not a prostitute, he proposes marriage. Marie is extremely offended and leaves town.

She reunites with Big Buck, a man who used to work in the mining camps for her father. He takes care of her while she recuperates and offers to pay for her to go to school for six months. He also proposes marriage, which Marie turns down.

While in school in Arizona, Marie meets Karin and Knut Larson. The siblings fascinate Marie because they are well educated. Marie becomes romantically involved with Knut. Knut and Karin decide to move to San Francisco. Marie receives a letter from her brother George stating that their father has sent them to work as farmhands for an abusive man. Marie is torn between helping her family and pursuing her education. She sends George what money she has and leaves for San Francisco. Marie and Knut get married with the understanding that it will be an equal partnership. She is introduced to socialism through friends of Karin. Marie becomes pregnant and has an abortion.

Beatrice, her younger sister, moves to live with her. Marie recognizes how hard life has been for her younger siblings. Marie becomes pregnant and once again has an abortion. While on the ride home, Knut instructs Marie to sit up so as not to cause a scene. Marie cannot accept Knut's orders as a husband to his wife. This is the final straw, and their marriage ends.

While at school, Marie meets an Indian who introduces her to the Indian independence movement. She is asked to leave school because of her liberal activities. On her way to New York City, Marie stops to meet her old pen pal, Robert Hampton, and is disappointed by his appearance and strong Christian beliefs. He attempts to convert her to Christianity.

Once in New York City, Marie lives with Karin and works as a stenographer for The Graphic. Marie becomes increasingly involved in the socialist movement, though she feels little emotional connection to the cause. She receives a letter from George requesting financial help. He is in jail for stealing a horse. Marie responds with a hateful letter and money. Not too long after, she receives a telegram from Dan informing her that George, who was released from jail because of his young age, has died in a ditch cave in. Marie is guilt ridden. Struggling financially, Dan decides to join the military and fight in World War I. Marie worries about him constantly.

Marie, still working vigorously as a journalist for The Call and attending school, meets an Indian named Sardar Ranjit Singh. Through him she becomes involved in the Indian independence movement. Talvar Singh, an Indian, asks her to hide a list of addresses for him. Juan Diaz, another member of the movement, breaks into Marie's apartment. When she arrives home, he interrogates her about Talvar Singh's whereabouts. Marie claims ignorance. Juan Diaz makes sexual advances and rapes Marie. Marie attempts suicide and is hospitalized. After returning home, she is arrested and interrogated about her involvement with the Indian independence movement. When Marie refuses to cooperate she is imprisoned.

After her release, she meets Anand Manvekar. The two fall in love and are soon married. Marie finds happiness in this marriage, but soon Anand's jealousy about Marie's sexual past becomes an issue. Marie's marriage and work with the movement are destroyed when Juan Diaz announces to a comrade that he and Marie engaged in sexual intercourse.

At the end of the book Marie has begged Anand to leave her because they will never be happy again, and she will only hold him back from his work. Marie sits alone in their apartment, her marriage and life work destroyed.

== Characters ==
- Marie Rogers - The protagonist of the story is believed to be a portrayal of Agnes Smedley. Her childhood is one of nomadic poverty, her father always moving the family in search of opportunities that continually fail. Beginning at a young age and reinforced throughout her life, Marie witnesses unhealthy marriages and gender bias. She grows up to relate marriage to slavery and refuses to compromise herself for a relationship. Because of this, her two marriages fail. Marie strives to make something of herself through education and hard work. Because of her background, she has a strong desire to see working-class people succeed. Marie's involvement in the Socialist Party leaves this desire unfilled. She finds purpose in the Indian liberation cause. Marie receives sharp criticism for assisting the Indian movement when so much help is needed in America. She stands by her decisions, claiming that all struggling people are her people. She does not see herself as purely “American” but as a daughter of earth.
- John Rogers - Marie's Father. A Missouri farmer, John moves from wood chopping to coal hauling in search of a better life. He repeatedly abandons his family or forces them to move in search of work and wealth. His attempts fail. He is seen as charming, and Marie admires his story-telling abilities.
- Elly Rogers - Marie's mother. Elly Rogers is an abused wife. The mother-daughter relationship changes as Marie grows up, and heavily influences Marie's attitudes toward marriage and children. Often characterized in the novel by her rough hands, black from work, Elly works as a wash woman and later running a boarding house to support her family during her husband's frequent absences. She dies at an early age from poor nutrition.
- Helen - Elly Rogers's beautiful younger sister. Helen is strong, proud, independent, and loves life. She is admired and envied by both genders. Although once engaged to Annie's husband, Sam, Helen never marries and makes her living as a prostitute, attracted by beautiful things, a better income than marriage offers, and the control prostitution allows her to have over her own body. When Marie's father fails to provide for his family, Helen takes on the responsibility. Marie maintains a close relationship with her aunt.
- Beatrice, George, and Dan - Marie's three younger siblings. Beatrice, George, and Dan, are sent to work for families following their mother's death. Ill-treated, they turn to their sister for help. While Marie supports Beatrice, she lacks the resources to also provide for her brothers. George eventually dies in a ditch cave-in, and Dan serves in the military before going to live with his father and Sam.
- Annie Rogers - Marie's older sister. As a working woman, she holds her own in confrontations with her father. She marries Sam and makes a good wife. She dies in child birth shortly after marriage.
- Sam Walker - Helen's beau when she was a young girl, he marries Marie's sister Annie. Later John Rogers and Dan also live with him in Oklahoma.
- Big Buck - A large, quiet, and proud man, this one-time cowboy exudes the spirit of the West. Originally introduced as one of John Rogers's employees, he and Marie reunite when she moves to Arizona. He supports Marie for six months while she is in school. He proposes to Marie, but she turns him down.
- Robert Hampton - A pen pal of Marie who sends his old books by mail. Marie idealizes him. His image is shattered when she finally meets him and discovers their ideas on religion, politics, and gender differ greatly.
- Knut Larsen - Marie's first husband and the brother of Karin Larson is a highly educated socialist. Their marriage, based on equality, is strained and fails when Knut tells Marie to take his first husbandly command to sit upright in a street car and she refuses.
- Karin Larsen - A statuesque Scandinavian woman from the East, Karin is the sister of Knut Larson. Karin is skeptical of academic conventions. Through Karin, Marie first learns about socialism.
- Anand Manvekar - Marie's second husband, an Indian whose revolutionary ideas extend to women also. He thinks that without the freedom of women, the world will not advance; however, he cannot handle Marie's sex/rape incident with Juan Diaz. The marriage falls apart.
- Juan Diaz - A Eurasian, Juan is half Indian and half Portuguese. A Christian by religion, he is a cynical man who openly claims that his revolutionary ideas do not extend to women. He rapes Marie, then blackmails her and her husband which, eventually, becomes the source of Marie and Anand's breakup.
- Sardarji Ranjit Singh - An Indian historian, Singh comes from militant people and has been arrested in the struggle for freedom in India. Marie describes him as tall, thin, and ugly. He becomes Marie's teacher, mentor, and employer.
- Talvar Singh - One of many Indian students who congregate in Sardarji Ranjit Singh's home. Talvar passes to Marie a confidential list of Indian names for safekeeping. Authorities arrest him at the same time they take Marie into custody and accuse her of being a spy.

== Composition ==
The fictional character of Marie Rogers lives a life similar to Agnes Smedley's. While the novel is fiction, the content is predominantly autobiographical. In the 1987 republication, Alice Walker states in her foreword “... it is the true story (give or take a few minor changes, deletions, or embellishments) of one woman’s life. Marie Rogers of Daughter of Earth is Agnes Smedley” (2). In his 1973 afterword, Paul Lauter discusses Smedley's life, full of struggle and hardship, as it led up to the writing of Daughter of Earth as a therapeutic exercise. “Psychoanalysis...was for her not a fad but a last remedy” (411). The novel is divided into seven parts. Daughter of Earth has become a standard piece of proletarian literature because of its focus on the struggles of the working class.

== Critical reception and analysis ==
Possibly the two most popularly addressed issues with Daughter of Earth are gender and class. Barbara Foley asserts that Marie's desire for sexual egalitarianism ties in with her struggle to create a better world. In her view, Marie's eventual ability to feel passion for Anand is a sign of her trust for Anand as a political comrade. Once she realizes that he doesn't live up to her ideal notions of gender equality, she leaves him.

Sondra Guttman claims that the issues of gender, race, and class intermingle, impeding the progress of one another. The struggle between men and women for equality is impeded by the challenges of working-class life, which often cause men to feel inadequate and women to feel helpless. Men and women are pitted against one another by capitalism in order to keep the working class from strengthening. The oppression Marie sees as a child is predominantly gendered, but as she grows to adulthood, oppression based on class and race become more popular. The scene of Marie's rape is viewed not as the rape of a woman by a man but as a white woman by an Indian man, which impedes interracial and gender relations.

Christie Launius, in her comparison of Bread Givers by Anzia Yezierska, Daughter of Earth by Agnes Smedley, and The Great Midland by Alexander Saxton, notes issues related to gender as well. Launius notes that Marie's aversion to marriage may largely be based on her motivation to obtain class mobility. Being married to a working-class man would obstruct this goal because Marie would not likely be allowed to continue her education. This is why both of Marie's marriages are to educated men who will not deny her goals and may, in fact, help her to obtain them. Yerkes makes a similar point. He contends that Marie sees education as a form of escape from the vicious cycles of marriage and family in holding women in the working class. In contrast to the cowboys of her childhood, she idolizes Robert Hampton; he will not threaten her desire to better herself.

Andrew C. Yerkes argues that Daughter of Earth stands out among other literature of the 1930s which remained sexist in its portrayals of women. He addresses the gender reversal apparent in the novel. Marie is untraditionally masculine, while she becomes more and more attracted to effeminate men. He connects Marie's love of Anand to her love of India, claiming Anand is India personified. Similarly, Paula Rabinowitz looks at Daughter of Earth in contrast to proletarian literature dealing with gender roles in marriage, family, and sexuality written by men. She explains that Smedley and other female writers show women revolting against the stereotypes enhanced by marriage, family, and heterosexuality. Daughter of Earth, according to Rabinowitz, is an “antidomestic novel” (84). Rabinowitz also takes on the arguments made by Walter Rideout who claims sexuality in proletarian literature is seen as healthy. Rabinowitz notes that proletarian literature written by women would suggest otherwise, likely because it looks at sexuality from the perspective of women instead of men. Novels like Daughter of Earth depict sexual activity as repressive for women. The oppression of female sexuality in the working class is shown to be similar to class oppression in the United States. The working class is viewed as masculine, yet it needs women in order to be successful in creating unity within the class. Therefore, the issue of sexuality creates conflict in working-class unity.

Family dynamics also play a vital role in the novel. Unlike other 1930s Leftist novels, Daughter of Earth depicted family as a negative entity which would ruin an individual's chances for a happy life. The role of the daughter is pertinent to the novel. Daughter symbolizes legacy, not just of the family, but also, in the case of Daughter of Earth, of the nation and the world. Yerkes notes that Smedley's Freudian psychoanalysis made her all too aware of philosophy. Smedley consciously uses her psychoanalysis when addressing her issues with gender in Daughter of Earth. As a child, Marie has an extreme hatred for her mother and feels her father can do no wrong. Barbara Foley makes a similar Freudian argument when she acknowledges Marie's connection between the belt buckle of Juan Diaz and the colorful belt her father wore.

Daughter of Earth also presents images of motherhood in such a negative light that Marie Rogers vows to escape marriage and all it entails. In “A Wake for Mother: The Maternal Deathbed in Women’s Fiction” Judith Kegan Gardiner elaborates on the role of motherhood in Daughter of Earth. She explains the role of mothers in recent literature as a juxtaposition between traditional womanly roles and the protagonist's desire to break free. Marie's mother's death signifies an end.

Another widely discussed element of Daughter of Earth is the context in which it was written and its format. The novel is widely believed to be autobiographical. In his 1973 afterword of the novel, Paul Lauter notes the similarities between Marie's and Smedley's lives. In essence, they are identical with changes mostly to geography and names. Lauter explains that Smedley wrote the novel while seeking psychoanalysis. The novel was meant to be a therapeutic exercise performed while in therapy.

Nancy Hoffman addresses the unique structure of the novel, which she also attributes to the therapeutic purpose of the writing. Daughter of Earth takes on three forms as it progresses through her childhood and adult life: mythic, novelistic, and autobiographical. Hoffman is somewhat critical of this format, noting that it may hinder fluid reading.
