= Backbone Flute =

1915 Russian-language poem by Mayakovsky

- 1919 edition book cover
- Author: Vladimir Mayakovsky
- Original title: Флейта-позвоночник
- Language: Russian
- Genre: Poem
- Publication date: 1915
- Publication place: Russia
- Media type: Print (hardback & paperback)
- Preceded by: A Cloud in Trousers
- Followed by: The War and the World

Backbone Flute (Russian: Флейта-позвоночник, romanized: Fleyta-pozvonochnik) is a poem by Vladimir Mayakovsky written in the autumn of 1915 and first published in December of that year in Vzyal (Russian: Взял, lit. 'took') almanac, heavily censored. Its first unabridged version appeared in March 1919, in Vladimir Mayakovsky's Collected Works 1909-1919.

The poem deals with the themes of passionate love hurled down to the feet of a woman who still prefers safe haven of domesticity and social status provided by her successful husband, vengeful God's cruelty, death and suicide.

== Synopsis ==
The poet rises his "skull filled with verses," starting what he anticipates to be his "final concert" before finishing his life with "a bullet for a dot.". He curses his beloved (wondering "what heavenly Hoffmann might have invented you, the vile one"), then blames God for bringing to Earth this woman, a devil in disguise. Visiting her at home, he implores Lilya to leave her ageing husband, then, horrified by her aloof coldness, threatens again to kill himself, now by drowning. He sees his love as something more horrible than World War I, yet threatens to haunt the woman he loves forever. Her husband returns home in surprisingly good moods, which the poets tries to spoil by advising him to "hang loads of pearls upon her neck" so as to keep her by his side. Eventually, ignored by everybody, he recognizes himself as a failed Messiah, "crucified on paper, with words for nails."

== Background ==
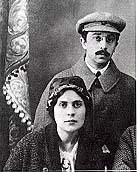
Lilya and Osip Briks

In July 1915 Mayakovsky for the first time met husband and wife Osip and Lilya Briks at their dacha in Malakhovka nearby Moscow. Soon the latter's sister Elsa invited him to the Briks' Petrograd flat. There Mayakovsky recited the yet unpublished poem A Cloud in Trousers and announced it as dedicated to the hostess. "That was the happiest day in my life," he wrote in his autobiography I, Myself years later.

Described variously as "one of the most exciting women of her times," or a cynical manipulator who "could be mournful, seductive, capricious, haughty, vacant, fickle, passionate, intelligent – whichever you wanted her," according to Viktor Shklovsky, Lilya found herself the unwilling object of the poet's all-consuming passion. "For two and a half years I didn't have a moment's peace. I understood right away that Volodya was a genius, but I didn't like him. I didn't like clamorous people ... I didn't like the fact that he was so tall and people in the street would stare at him; I was annoyed that he enjoyed listening to his own voice, I couldn't even stand the name Mayakovsky... sounding so much like a cheap pen name," she claimed in her memoirs. Nevertheless, not only did Lilya respond to this "assault" benevolently, her husband too has got infatuated with Mayakovskty's artistic persona so as to leave his career of a successful lawyer and businessman behind and submerge himself totally both into the poet's publishing affairs and the Futurists movement.

Still, as part of a love triangle, Mayakovsky, during the early stages of these relationships, felt distressed by Lilya's reluctance to give herself to him unreservedly, preferring instead to cling to her well-placed, financially reliable husband. These frustrations are reflected in the poem's critique of God and the modern world in which love is constrained by moral conventions and economic interests.

== History ==
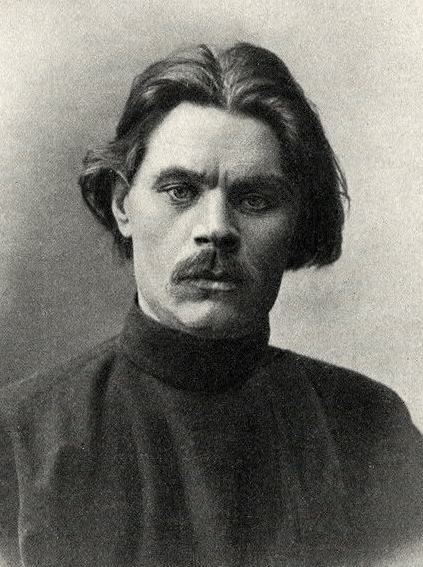
Maxim Gorky who was one of the first to recognize Mayakovsky as a big poet proved to be the only champion of the Backbone Flute

Backbone Flute was written in the autumn of 1915, soon after Mayakovsky, now unwilling to fight in the War, accepted his new friend Maxim Gorky's help and joined the Petrograd military automobile driving school. The poem was completed in November, originally called Verses for Her (Стихи ей, Stikhi ei).

In December of that year, it appeared in Vzyal (Взял, Took) almanac, severely cut (with lines 35–36, 69-75 missing) and in February 1916 was released as a book by Vzyal Publishers, with even more censorial interventions: also gone were lines 17–20, 76–81, 88–94, 114-121 and 178–185, as well as every single mention of "God" and "the Almighty". The poem's full text appeared for the first time in the Vladimir Mayakovsky's Collected Works 1909-1919 collection where it was titled The Backbone's Flute (Флейта позвоночника).

The poem could be seen as a sequel to its predecessor, according to biographer A.Mikhaylov. Both were autobiographical and shared the common leitmotif, that of love being killed by the social conventions and bourgeois morality. As A Cloud in Trousers several months earlier, Backbone Flute outraged most of the contemporary Russian critics, some of whom referred to the author as a talentless charlatan, spurning "empty words of a malaria sufferer," others as a psychically unstable man "who should be hospitalized immediately."

The only major Russian author to praise the poem was Maxim Gorky. B.Yurkovsky, who knew Gorky and his family well, has left such an entry in his diary: "Alexey Maximovich has gone totally mad about Mayakovsky lately; he considers him to be [Russia's] biggest poet of today, certainly the most gifted one. His Backbone Flute poem he is just raving about. Never tired of praising Mayakovsky's grandiosity and uniqueness, speaks of how there's no more Futurism now as such, only Mayakovsky stands alone, Russia's greatest poet." "This is the backbone, the very essence of the world's poetry, the poetry of the spinal cord," ["это позвоночная струна, самый смысл мировой лирики, лирики спинного мозга"] Gorky reportedly said, commenting on the poem's title.
