= Agnes Smedley =

American journalist and writer

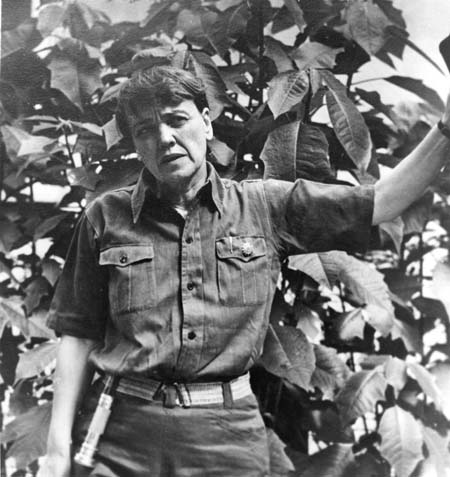
- Agnes Smedley, 1939
- Born: February 23, 1892; Osgood, Missouri, U.S.
- Died: May 6, 1950 (aged 58); London, England
- Resting place: Babaoshan Revolutionary Cemetery, Beijing, China
- Occupations: Journalist, writer
- Works: Daughter of Earth
- Spouse: Ernest Brundin (1912–1916)
- Partner: Virendranath Chattopadhyaya (1920-1928)

Agnes Smedley (February 23, 1892 – May 6, 1950) was an American journalist, writer and activist who supported the Indian Independence Movement and the Chinese Communist Revolution. Raised in a poverty-stricken miner's family in Missouri and Colorado, she dramatized the formation of her feminist and socialist consciousness in the autobiographical novel Daughter of Earth (1929).

As a college student during World War I, she organized support for the independence of India from the United Kingdom, receiving financial support from the government of Germany. After the war she went to Germany, where she met and worked with Indian nationalists. Between 1928 and 1941, she lived and worked in China, mainly as a journalist. During the first phase of the Chinese Civil War, she was based in Shanghai and published widely in support of the communist cause; later, during the Second Sino-Japanese War, she traveled with the Eighth Route Army and lived for a time in the communist base in Yan'an.

In addition to Daughter of Earth, Smedley's publications include four non-fiction books on China; reportage for newspapers in the United States, England and Germany and a biography of the Chinese communist general Zhu De. She was accused of being a spy for the Comintern and working with such agents as Richard Sorge, who was among her lovers.

== Background ==
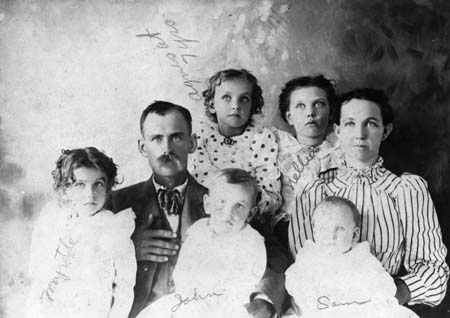
The Smedley family, 1899

Agnes Smedley was born in Osgood, Missouri, on February 23, 1892, the second of five children. In 1901, at the age of nine, she and her family moved to Trinidad, Colorado, where she witnessed many of the events in the 1903–04 coal miners' strike. Her father worked for several of the coal companies in Colorado and the family moved back and forth across southwestern Colorado. She finished eighth grade in Tercio at age 16. At the age of 17, Smedley took the county teacher's examination and taught in rural schools near her home for a semester. She returned home when her mother, Sarah, became ill. Sarah died in early 1910.

Later that year, with the help of an aunt, Smedley enrolled in a business school in Greeley, Colorado, after which she worked as a traveling salesperson. Suffering from physical and emotional stress in 1911, Smedley checked into a sanatorium. A family friend in Arizona offered her a place to stay after she was discharged, and from 1911 to 1912 Smedley enrolled in Tempe Normal School. She published her first writings as editor and contributor to the school paper, Tempe Normal Student. At Tempe, she became friends with a woman named Thorberg Brundin and her brother Ernest Brundin. Both Brundins were members of the Socialist Party of America and gave Smedley her first exposure to socialist ideas. When the Brundins left Tempe for San Francisco, they invited Smedley to come stay with them, and in August 1912 Smedley married Ernest. The marriage did not last, however; by 1916, Smedley and her husband divorced and at the beginning of 1917, Smedley moved to New York City.

Smedley's sister-in-law, Thorberg Brundin, had herself recently returned to New York, and Smedley was able to stay with Brundin and her husband Robert Haberman in their Greenwich Village home for her first few months in New York. During her stay with them, Smedley came to know a number of Brundin's acquaintances, including feminist Henrietta Rodman and birth control activist Margaret Sanger.

== Career ==
=== Indian activism ===
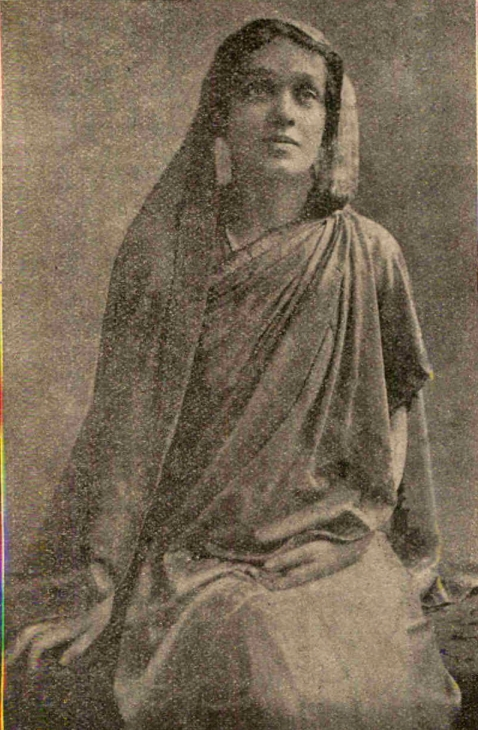
Smedley in a sari, 1928

During this same time, Smedley also became involved with a number of Bengali Indian revolutionaries working in the United States, including M. N. Roy and Shailendranath Ghosh. Working to overthrow British rule in India, these revolutionaries saw World War I as an opportunity for their cause, and began to cooperate with Germany, which saw in the revolutionaries' activities an opportunity to distract Britain from the European battlefront. The cooperation between the revolutionaries and Germany became known as the Hindu–German Conspiracy, and the United States government soon took action against the Indians. Roy and Ghosh both moved to Mexico, and recruited Smedley to help coordinate the group's activities in the United States during their absence, including operating a front office for the group and publishing anti-allied propaganda. Most of these activities continued to be funded by Germany. Both American and British military intelligence soon became interested in Smedley's activities. To avoid surveillance, Smedley changed addresses frequently, moving ten times in the period from May 1917 to March 1918, according to biographer Ruth Price.

In March 1918, Smedley was finally arrested by the U.S. Naval Intelligence Bureau. She was indicted for violations of the Espionage Act, first in New York and later in San Francisco. She was imprisoned for two months, and then released on bail through the efforts of friends such as Rodman. Smedley spent the next year and a half fighting the indictments; the New York indictment was dismissed in late 1918, and the government dropped the San Francisco charges in November 1919. Smedley continued working for the next year on behalf of the Indians who had been indicted in the Hindu–German Conspiracy Trial. She then moved to Germany, where she met an Indian communist, Virendranath Chattopadhyaya, whom she then lived with for several years in Germany, involved with various left-wing causes. Apart from Chatto, she had also an affair with an Indian student from Oxford, Barkat Ali Mirza, who had been to Berlin in 1926. He wanted an Islamic marriage, which she refused.

In 1928, she finished her autobiographical novel Daughter of Earth. She then left Chattopadhyaya and moved to Shanghai, initially as a correspondent for a liberal German newspaper. Daughter of Earth was published in 1929 to general acclaim.

=== Years in China ===
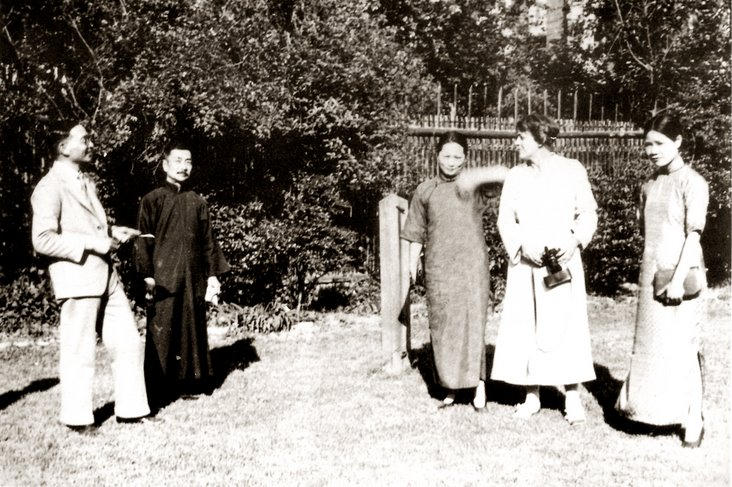
With friends and literary colleagues in Shanghai. From left to right: Lin Yutang, Lu Xun, Soong Ching-ling, Smedley, Li Peihua

In 1933, Smedley wrote China's Red Army Marches, for which Red Army commanders were her sources.

In China, Smedley served as a correspondent for the Frankfurter Zeitung and the Manchester Guardian. She covered many topics, including the Anti-Japanese War as a major war correspondent. In Xi'an during the Xi'an Incident of December 1936, she was awaken by soldiers and recruited to broadcast the news in English via radio. Smedley's broadcasts assured foreign powers that that Chiang Kai-shek was safe, and that the incident was not a coup but rather an attempt to unite the country.

She then reported on the Second Sino-Japanese War during the Second United Front. She traveled to Yan'an in January 1937 and with the 8th Route Army that year. She traveled with the New Fourth Army in 1938–39, as well as visiting some units of the non-Communist Chinese army.

Smedley had a sexual relationship with Richard Sorge, a Soviet spymaster, while in Shanghai, and probably with Ozaki Hotsumi, a correspondent for the Asahi Shimbun. Later he translated Smedley's Daughter of Earth into Japanese. She introduced Sorge to Ozaki, who became Sorge's most important informant in Japan. Maj. Gen. Charles A. Willoughby, who served with Gen. Douglas MacArthur's chief of intelligence, claimed that Smedley was a member of the anti-Japanese Sorge spy ring. After the war, Smedley threatened to sue Willoughby for making the accusation. Ruth Price, author of the most recent and extensive biography of Smedley, writes that there is very strong evidence in former Soviet archives that Smedley was indeed a spy who engaged in espionage for the Comintern and on behalf of the Soviet Union. Soviet archives also make it clear that Smedley's connection to the Comintern ended in 1936.

In 1937 she applied for membership in the Chinese Communist Party but was rejected due to Party reservations about her lack of discipline and what it viewed as her excessive independence of mind. Smedley was devastated by this rejection but remained passionately devoted to the Chinese communist cause.

Smedley left Yan'an in 1937; thereafter she organized medical supplies and continued writing. From 1938 to 1941, she visited both Communist and Kuomintang forces in the war zone. It was during her stay with Communist forces in Yan'an, after the Long March, that she conducted extensive interviews with General Zhu De, the basis of her book on him. She was helped later with her book by the actress and writer Wang Ying who was living in the USA during the 1940s.

It is recorded that this is the longest tour of the Chinese war front conducted by any foreign correspondent, male or female.

=== Final years ===
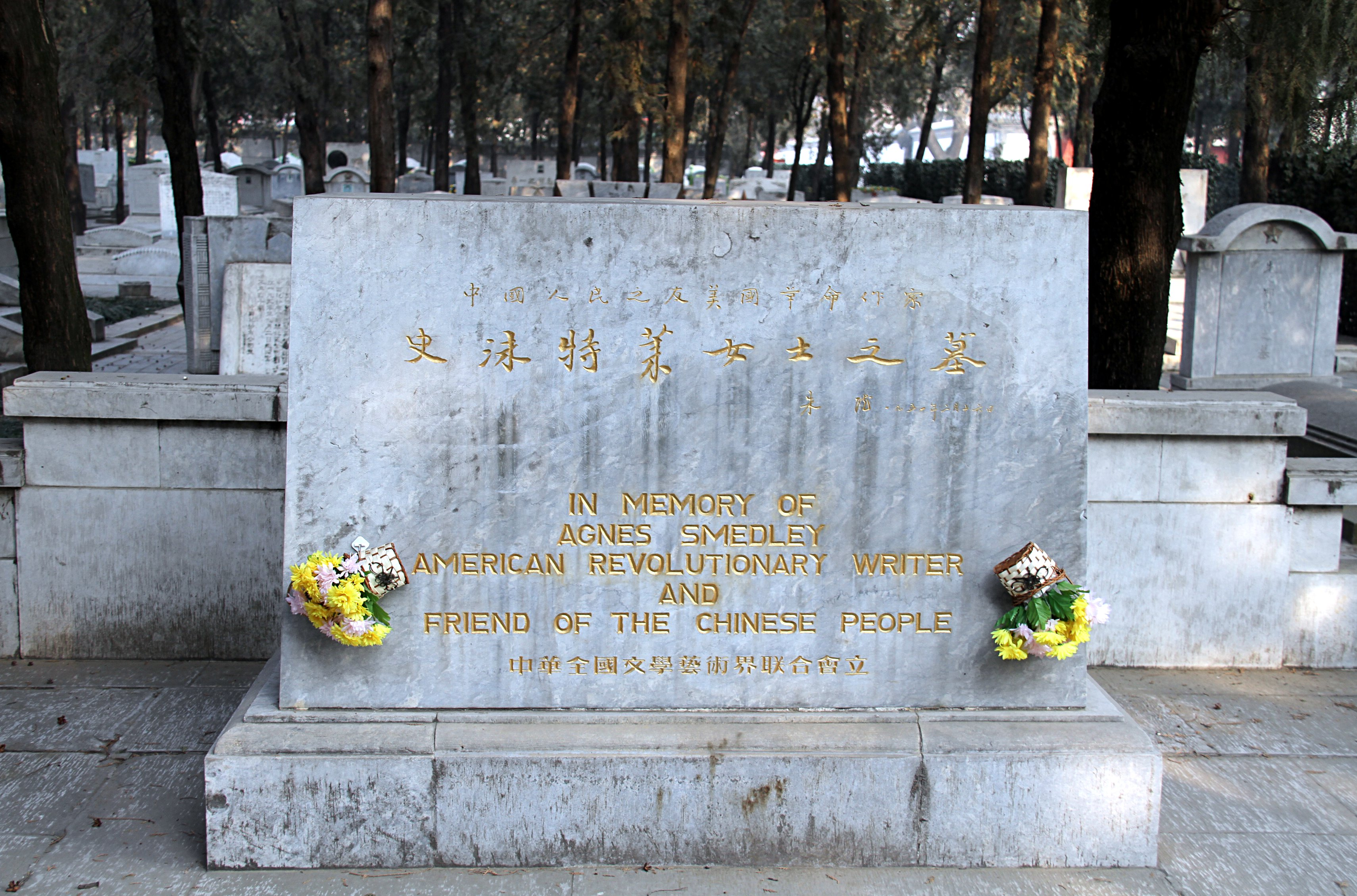
Headstone for Agnes Smedley at the Babaoshan Revolutionary Cemetery in Beijing

She relocated to Washington, DC in 1941 to advocate for China and authored several works on China's revolution. In the mid 1940s she was an influential voice in support of the Chinese Communists on public forums and NBC radio. Her 1944 book Battle Hymn of China was widely read and reviewed. During the 1940s she lived at Yaddo, a writer's colony in upstate New York and lived at times with Edgar Snow. In 1947, she was accused of espionage by General Douglas MacArthur, and followed by the FBI. Feeling pressure, she left the U.S. in the autumn of 1949. She died in the UK in 1950, after a surgery for an ulcer.

Her ashes were buried at the Babaoshan Revolutionary Cemetery in Beijing in 1951.

== Legacy ==
Smedley's final book, a biography of Zhu De, was incomplete at the time of her death. It was published in 1956.

Smedley is a featured figure on Judy Chicago's installation piece The Dinner Party, being represented as one of the 999 names on the Heritage Floor.

According to PBS, in her work as triple agent for Communists in China, India, and the Soviet Union, Smedley "was one of the most prolific female spies of the 20th century."

== Bibliography ==
=== Main works ===
Cover of 1987 edition by the Feminist Press of Smedley's Daughter of Earth

- Daughter of Earth (1929)
- Chinese Destinies: Sketches of Present-Day China (1933)
- China's Red Army Marches (1934)
- China Fights Back: An American Woman with the Eighth Route Army (1938)
- Battle Hymn of China (1943, republished in 1984 as China Correspondent)
- The Great Road: The Life and Times of Chu Teh (1956, published posthumously)

=== Miscellaneous ===
- Stories of the Wounded: An Appeal for Orthopaedic Centres of the Chinese Red Cross (1941, pamphlet)
- "After the Final Victory," published in Asia Magazine and included in Ernest Hemingway's edited collection Men at War
- Portraits of Chinese Women in Revolution (1976, anthology, edited by Jan and Steve MacKinnon)

== See also ==
- Jack Belden – fellow correspondent in China
- Xu Zhimo – Chinese poet with whom Smedley was romantically involved
- Anna Louise Strong – fellow supporter of Chinese communism

== References and further reading ==
- Agnes Smedley, "Cell Mates," from Call Magazine (Sunday supplement to the New York Call) 15, 22, 29 February, 14 March 1920, reprinted in Franklin, H., Bruce (1998). Prison Writing in 20th-Century America. New York: Penguin. ISBN 0-14-027305-0.
- Veronika Feuchtner (November 11, 2013). Agnes Smedley between Berlin, Bombay and Beijing: Sexology, Communism and National Independence (video). Hannover, New Hampshire, USSA: Dartmouth College. Event occurs at 28:07.
- Stranahan, Patricia (1988). "Review of MacKinnon, Agnes Smedley: Life and Times of an American Radical". The Journal of Asian Studies. 47 (4): 863–865. doi:10.2307/2057879. JSTOR 2057879.
- MacKinnon, Janice; MacKinnon, Stephen R. (1988). Agnes Smedley: The Life and Times of an American Radical. Berkeley: University of California Press. ISBN 0-520-06614-6.
- Price, Ruth (2005). The Lives of Agnes Smedley. Oxford: Oxford University Press. ISBN 0-19-514189-X.
- Rabinowitz, Paula (1991). Labor and Desire: Women's Revolutionary Fiction in Depression America. Chapel Hill: University of North Carolina Press. ISBN 0-8078-4332-6.
- Willoughby, Charles Andrew (1952) Shanghai Conspiracy: The Sorge Spy Ring: Moscow, Shanghai, Tokyo, San Francisco, New York. E.P. Dutton and Co., New York (reprinted, Boston: Western Islands, 1965).
