= Dallas Dispatch =

Daily evening newspaper in Dallas, Texas

The Dallas Dispatch
- Owner(s): (Scripps-McRae Association). (Alfred O. Andersson)
- Publisher: newspaper’s existence
- Associate editor: Scripps-McRae Association
- Language: English
- Ceased publication: Ceased Publication in 1942

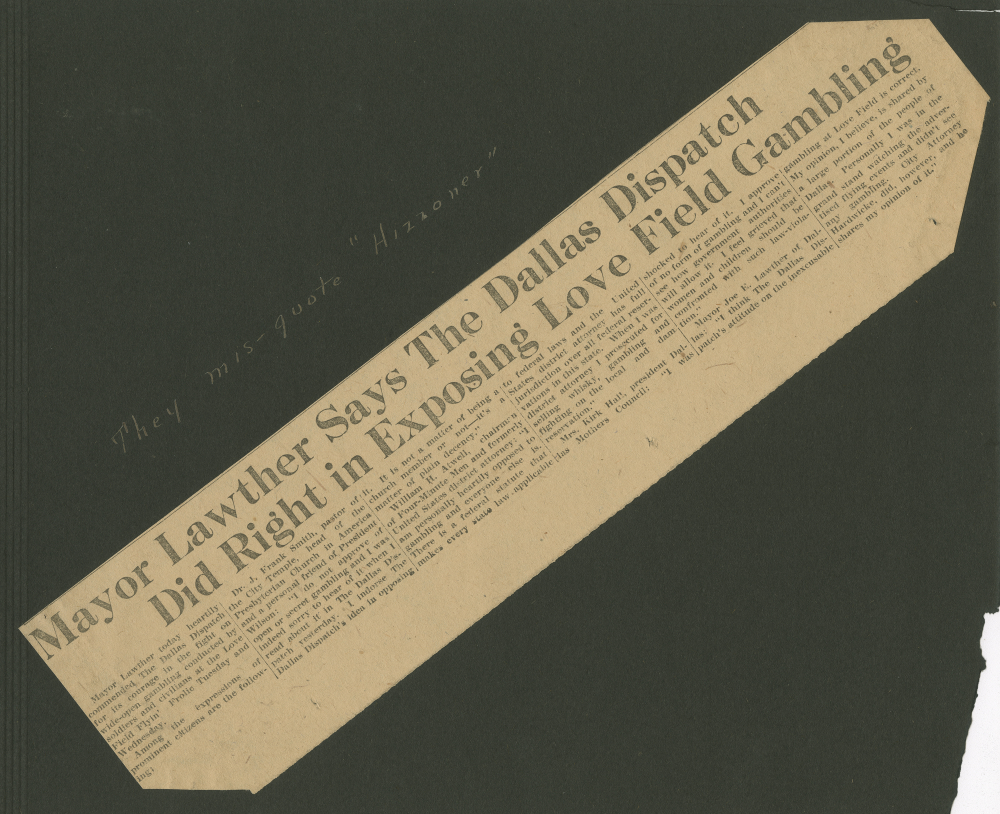
Newspaper Clipping Regarding Mayor Congratulating Dallas Dispatch for Exposing Gambling at 'Flyin' Frolic' Event. November 1918.

The Dallas Dispatch was a daily evening newspaper published in Dallas, Texas, United States from 1906 until it was combined with the evening Dallas Journal in 1938 to create The Dallas Dispatch-Journal, the name of which was shortened to The Dallas Journal in 1939 and which ceased publication in 1942.

The Dispatch began publication on September 17, 1906 with a four-page issue. (It presumably was not related to an earlier Dallas Dispatch, which had gone out of business in July 1894.) The paper was owned by the Scripps-McRae Association. Alfred O. Andersson was its first editor and H. J. Richmond its first business manager.

Andersson was its publisher for most of the newspaper’s existence, and Lewis W. Bailey was its editor for many years. Andersson retired as publisher in March 1937 without relinquishing his ownership interest, and in June 1938 he formed The Dispatch-Journal Publishing Company with Karl Hoblitzelle and John Moroney to acquire the Dispatch and another evening newspaper, The Dallas Journal, which had been a sister publication of The Dallas Morning News. The resulting Dallas Dispatch-Journal was published six evenings a week with no Sunday edition. The Dispatch lived on as part of the new publication’s name until December 1939, when James M. West Sr. of Houston acquired control and shortened the name to The Dallas Journal.

The Dispatch campaigned for an emergency hospital, the cleaning up of criminal law enforcement, and new franchises for city utilities. It gave more attention to crime news than did its competition and "probably set some kind of record with extra editions." It was said that it would "print anything a reporter was big enough to sign his name to," and that that once included using "ass" (referring to a donkey) in a headline, turning that edition into a collector’s item.

Dispatch employees included James F. Chambers Jr., a sports and crime reporter who became president and publisher of The Dallas Times-Herald, and Ralph Hall, who served in the Texas Senate and later the U.S. House of Representatives until 2015.
