= The Great Road: The Life and Times of Chu Teh =

Unfinished biography

- Title page for The Great Road: The Life and Times of Chu Teh (1956)
- Author: Agnes Smedley
- Language: English
- Subject: Zhu De
- Genre: Biography
- Publisher: Monthly Review Press
- Publication date: 1956

The Great Road: The Life and Times of Chu Teh, by Agnes Smedley (Monthly Review Press 1956), is an unfinished biography of Chinese Communist leader Zhu De.

Smedley died in 1950, with the work unfinished. Edgar Snow as her literary executor had trouble getting it published. He got a Japanese translation published in 1955, which had modest success. It was published in English in 1956 by the independent Marxist Monthly Review Press, with an introduction by Leo Huberman and Paul Sweezy, but did poorly.

It remains the only major English-language biography of a military commander who played a major role in Chinese history. In China, it is regarded as a classic. A Chinese translation has sold millions.

The biography includes an account of how he was a radical in the 1911 Chinese Revolution, but shared in the general corruption and failure of the warlord area. And how he remade himself as a believer in Leninist Communism.

There are gaps in the story. But it included Zhu's own account of the Battle of Luding Bridge. This differs slightly from that told in Edgar Snow's Red Star Over China. It seems that the earlier failure of a Taiping army at this same bridge had been told to Zhu when he was a child:

"On dark nights, when there is no moon, you can still hear the spirits of our Taiping dead wailing at the Ta Tu River crossing and over the town where they were slaughtered. They will wail until they are avenged. Then their spirits will rest."

The river is Tatu River in Red Star Over China and Dadu River in current transliteration. Zhu as transliterated by Smedley also speaks of "Lutinchiao" rather than Luding Bridge. And he mentions the man who led the attack and was first to die:

"For about two hundred yards there was nothing but iron chains swaying over the roaring torrent five hundred feel below…

"Whole units volunteered, but first honors went to a platoon commanded by Ma-Ta-chiu. Then a second platoon was chosen. The men of both platoons strapped their guns, swords, and hand grenades on their backs, and Platoon Commander Ma-Ta-chiu stepped out, grasped one of the chains, and began swinging, hand over hand, towards the north bank. The platoon political director followed, and after him the men. As they swung along, Red army machine guns laid down a protecting screen of fire and the Engineering Corps began bringing up tree trunks and laying the bridge flooring.

"The army watched breathlessly as the men swung along the bridge chains. Ma-Ta-chiu was the first to be shot into the wild torrent below. Then another man and another. The others pushed along, but just before they reached the flooring at the north bridgehead they saw enemy soldiers dumping cans of kerosene on the planks and setting them on fire. Watching the sheet of flame spread, some men hesitated, but the platoon political leader at last sprang down on the flooring before the flames reached his feet, calling on the others to follow. They came and crouches on the planks releasing their hand grenades and unbuckling their swords.

"They ran through the flames and threw their hand grenades in the midst of the enemy. More and more men followed, the flames lapping at their clothing… The bridge became a mass of running men with rifles ready, tramping out the flames as they ran. The enemy retreated to their second line of defences, but Lin Piao's division [which had previously crossed by boat] appeared suddenly in their rear and the battle ended.

"The battle of Lutinchiao lasted just one hour. Seventeen men were killed, many scorched and wounded, and a few severely burned."
