= The Flight of the Heron =

1925 novel by D. K. Broster

- Second US edition (Coward McCann, 1930)
- Author: D. K. Broster
- Language: English
- Genre: Historical novel
- Publisher: William Heinemann Ltd.
- Publication date: 1925
- Publication place: United Kingdom
- Pages: 408 (first edition, hardback)
- OCLC: 32281295

The Flight of the Heron is a historical novel by British author D. K. Broster, first published in 1925. Set in Scotland during the Jacobite rising of 1745, it follows the developing friendship between two men on opposite sides of the rising: Ewen Cameron, a Highland chieftain and Jacobite, and Keith Windham, an Englishman and an officer in the Government army.

It is the most popular of Broster’s works, having remained in print throughout the twentieth century and been adapted multiple times for radio, television and the stage. Broster wrote two sequels, The Gleam in the North (1927) and The Dark Mile (1929); while these were originally published as loose sequels, some later descriptions and omnibus editions use the title ‘The Jacobite Trilogy’ for the three novels.

== Background ==
Broster’s previous novels were largely set during the French Revolution and the Napoleonic Wars, but she was inspired to write about the ’45 during a visit to the Scottish Highlands. She wrote that ‘the spirit of the place got such a hold upon me that before I left I had the whole story planned almost in spite of myself.’

Another influence was Violet Jacob’s 1911 novel Flemington, which also features a close relationship between two men on opposite sides of the 1745 rising. The Flight of the Heron is dedicated to Jacob ‘in homage’.

== Plot ==
In July 1745, Ewen Cameron, a young Highland chieftain and ardent Jacobite, learns of Prince Charles Edward Stuart’s arrival in Scotland. Ewen’s foster-father, who has the ‘second sight’, foretells that Ewen will shortly meet a man whose destiny is entangled with his; a heron will bring them together.

Keith Windham, a captain in the Royal Scots, is leading a party of recruits when they are ambushed by Jacobites. Keith rides back alone for reinforcements, but his horse startles at a heron taking flight and breaks its leg; continuing on foot, Keith encounters Ewen, who takes him captive. Keith remains a parole prisoner for a week, at Ewen’s home of Ardroy and with the Jacobite army. After past disappointments, Keith is cynical about personal attachments, and moreover he believes Highlanders are barbarians; but he is struck by Ewen’s gentlemanly courtesy to him and by his handsome appearance, and finds himself increasingly drawn to Ewen. They are parted when Keith escapes.

In Edinburgh after the battle of Prestonpans (1745), Ewen accompanies Charles Edward on a secret mission. Keith leads a party of soldiers who follow them, attempting to capture Charles. While Charles escapes, Ewen is cornered; but the tables turn when Cameron reinforcements arrive and the soldiers under Keith’s command flee. Ewen, feeling sympathetically towards Keith, lets him escape.

After the Jacobites’ unsuccessful invasion of England, Ewen reunites with his fiancée Alison Grant at Inverness, and they marry hastily before Alison goes to France. Ewen is badly injured at the battle of Culloden (1746); his foster-brothers Neil and Lachlan MacMartin carry him to a shieling hut amongst the mountains. Here he is discovered by a party of soldiers, who kill Neil; but Ewen is saved by the arrival of Keith, who throws himself in front of the muskets in Ewen’s defence. Keith persuades the officer in charge, Major Guthrie, to spare Ewen’s life because he may have valuable information about his kinsman Lochiel. Later, Keith returns to nurse Ewen’s injuries and bring him food and drink.

Guthrie brings Ewen as a prisoner to Fort Augustus, where he is threatened with torture; eventually he involuntarily reveals information about Lochiel’s whereabouts by talking in his sleep. Keith hears of Ewen’s treatment, and, horrified, returns to Fort Augustus. He finds Ewen devastated by his ‘betrayal’ of Lochiel and by Keith’s apparent betrayal of him. Keith explains that he never meant to suggest Ewen would intentionally betray Lochiel and that he is appalled by the treatment Ewen has received; they reconcile. Ewen, still a prisoner, later learns that Lochiel has evaded capture. Meanwhile the Duke of Cumberland asks Keith to give evidence at Ewen’s trial for treason; Keith indignantly refuses, incurring the Duke’s wrath, and narrowly avoids ruining his career. Later, Keith visits Ewen again. Now on terms of friendly intimacy, Ewen thanks Keith for the service he has done him. Keith realises that, contrary to his earlier cynicism, his love for the honourable Ewen is worthwhile, and they could have been friends.

Ewen escapes and returns to Ardroy, where his cousin Archibald and his Aunt Margaret persuade Ewen to seek safety and join Alison in France. Meanwhile Keith is patrolling the coast to intercept Charles Edward’s escape. At Morar he discovers Ewen, and faces a dilemma between his duty to capture an important Jacobite and his desire to let Ewen, his friend, escape capture and probable execution. Before he can choose, Keith is attacked and stabbed by Lachlan, who still believes that Keith betrayed Ewen and who has followed him seeking revenge. Ewen finds Keith; they meet for the last time before Keith dies of his wound, and promise to be friends ‘always’.

Ewen escapes to France, where he reunites with Alison, while still grieving Keith’s death.

== Characters ==
Many of the novel's characters are real-life figures.

- Ewen Cameron of Ardroy, a Highland chieftain and fictional cousin of Lochiel
- Keith Windham, an English Hanoverian officer, whose life is intertwined with Ewen’s
- Alison Grant, Ewen’s fiancée
- Margaret Cameron, Ewen’s aunt who brought him up
- Donald Cameron of Lochiel, Chief of Clan Cameron
- Dr. Archie Cameron, Lochiel's brother
- Lachlan MacMartin, Ewen's foster brother
- Neil MacMartin, Ewen's foster brother
- Angus MacMartin, a seer; Ewen's foster father
- Bonnie Prince Charlie
- Hector Grant of Glenmoriston
- Major Guthrie
- Dougal Mackay
- Alexander MacDonald of Keppoch
- Lord George Murray
- Col. John O'Sullivan
- The Earl of Loudoun
- The Duke of Cumberland

== Themes ==
In common with many of Broster’s other works, The Flight of the Heron explores the theme of conflicting loyalties and the incompatible demands placed upon individuals by duty, personal honour and love in the context of wider historical events. Although Broster’s sympathies are predominantly with the Jacobites, she uses the viewpoints of two main characters on opposite sides to explore various Jacobite and Hanoverian perspectives upon the 1745 rising and to show the effects of the conflict on those involved in it.

Male friendship—here a growing friendship between men whose loyalties make them enemies—is another important theme, and also shared with other books by Broster. The attraction between Ewen and Keith can be read as homoerotic, the expression of this repressed desire being facilitated by the fantasy element in the plot—the prophecy foretelling their destined meetings through the agency of the heron.

== Reception ==
The Flight of the Heron received largely favourable reviews. The Westminster Gazette called the book ‘a delightful piece of writing’ and commented that the historical setting was ‘as vivid and attractive as though [the author] were turning virgin soil’, while the Oxford Chronicle and Reading Gazette said that ‘It is a ground which it might have been thought has been a little over-cultivated since Scott published “Waverley,” but in “The Flight of the Heron” it again yields an abundant harvest of romance.’ Both these reviews also praised the romantic atmosphere and the interest of the adventure plot, particularly in the portrayal of Ewen and Keith and their relationship. Similarly, Country Life commented that ‘it is the love which grows between these two young men, the sacrifices and suffering to which it brings them, which give the book its fine quality... the romance of heroic fighting and loving—the love of David and Jonathan—lifts it far above the ordinary’, also noting the novel’s vivid descriptions of Highland landscapes. The first line of the novel, 'The sun had been up for a couple of hours', was used in the Genesis song Eleventh Earl Of Mar, from the 1976 album Wind and Wuthering, written by Tony Banks.

== Adaptations ==
A six-part adaptation of The Flight of the Heron was broadcast by the BBC Home Service in 1944, dramatised by Catherine M. Barr and starring Gordon Jackson as Ewen and Philip Cunningham as Keith. Another dramatisation, again by Barr, aired on the BBC’s Children’s Hour in 1959, starring Bryden Murdoch as Ewen. The novel was adapted for radio again in 1968, with an eight-part dramatisation for BBC Radio 4 produced by Ian Wishart; Bryden Murdoch reprised the role of Ewen alongside Ian Dewar as Keith.

An eight-part television adaptation was made by Scottish Television in 1968, directed by Brian Mahoney and starring Ian McCulloch as Ewen and Jon Laurimore as Keith. In 1976 a second television adaptation was broadcast on BBC Scotland, directed by Alastair Reid and starring David Rintoul as Ewen and Tom Chadbon as Keith.

The novel was adapted for the stage in 1997 by Turtle Key Arts; the production featured traditional Gaelic songs and new music composed by Stephen Nash.
