= Battle Hymn of China =

1943 book by Agnes Smedley

Battle Hymn of China (reprinted as China Correspondent)
- First edition (US)
- Author: Agnes Smedley
- Language: English
- Genre: War Journalism
- Publisher: Alfred A. Knopf (US), Victor Gollancz (UK)
- Publication date: 1943, 1944
- Publication place: United States
- Media type: Print (book)
- Pages: 362 pp.
- ISBN: 0-86358-036-X

Battle Hymn of China by Agnes Smedley, reprinted as China Correspondent, is a book of reporting containing a first-hand account of the early years of the Sino-Japanese War, from the viewpoint of a US journalist and left-wing activist. A 1944 review said "it deals largely with military affairs" but "reaches into many of the social, economic and psychological aspects of the life of the whole people as they meet the relentless demands of the struggle.

== Synopsis ==
It was written at a time when the Kuomintang and the Chinese Communist Party were in a United Front against the Japanese invasion, and before the Japanese attack on the United States at Pearl Harbor.

Agnes Smedley had spent many years in China, and spent much of it with the various armies, both regular and guerrilla. Like Edgar Snow, she met the future leaders of Communist China when they were living in rural isolation. She also witnessed the Xi'an Incident and gives her own account of it in this book, along with her view of He Long, Chu Teh (Zhu De) and Mao. She takes her own very distinct view of Mao:

What I now remember of Mao Tze-tung was the following months of precious friendship; they both confirmed and contradicted his inscrutability. The sinister quality I had first felt so strongly in him proved to be spiritual isolation. As Chu Teh was loved, Mao Tze-tung was respected. The few who came to know him best had affection for him, but his spirit dwelt within itself, isolating him...

In him was none of the humility of Chu. Despite that feminine quality in him, he was as stubborn as a mule and a steel rod of pride and determination ran through his nature. I had the impression that he would wait and watch for years, but eventually have his way.

She also spent time with rank-and-file and non-Communist Chinese, living at the same level as ordinary Chinese and using basic First Aid skills to help in hospitals where both supplies and trained staff were short.

Though the book describes a war, it is mostly about how various individuals react to the war, mostly Chinese but also foreigners. She gives a poignant account of how she wanted to adopt a Chinese boy who had served as her orderly, and to secure a good education for him. But the boy felt it was his duty to stay with the army.

She takes an individual and non-ideological view, noting merit where she sees it, including among captured Japanese who had turned against the war. She also notes and praises a community of nuns that was living at the same level as poor Chinese. She takes a polite view of Chiang Kai-shek and praises the work of Madame Chiang Kai-shek (Soong Mei-ling).

Although the book was published in 1943, it ends with the events of 1941. A Japanese attack on the European powers and the United States is correctly foreseen. She frequently notes how the Japanese were using war materials supplied by the US.

The book was highly influential at the time. It is not currently in print, but was re-issued in 1984 under the title China Correspondent. It is frequently cited as a source in biographies of Mao.
