= Afterword on Rupert Brooke =

Afterword on Rupert Brooke is a poem by F. T. Prince published in 1976. Prince's note on the poem states, "The verse is syllabic, in a measure of twelve syllables devised by Robert Bridges." He is referring to Bridges' Neo-Miltonic Syllabics. Prince notes that Bridges' poem "Poor Poll" was his first illustration of the meter's potentialities, and remains the best guide to its structure. He adds that he used fewerelisions than did Bridges in the later and more famous example of the meter, The Testament of Beauty (1930), and that he aimed for a "greater variety of rhythm" than found in Poor Poll.
