= John Milton's poetic style =

Poetic structure popularized by John Milton

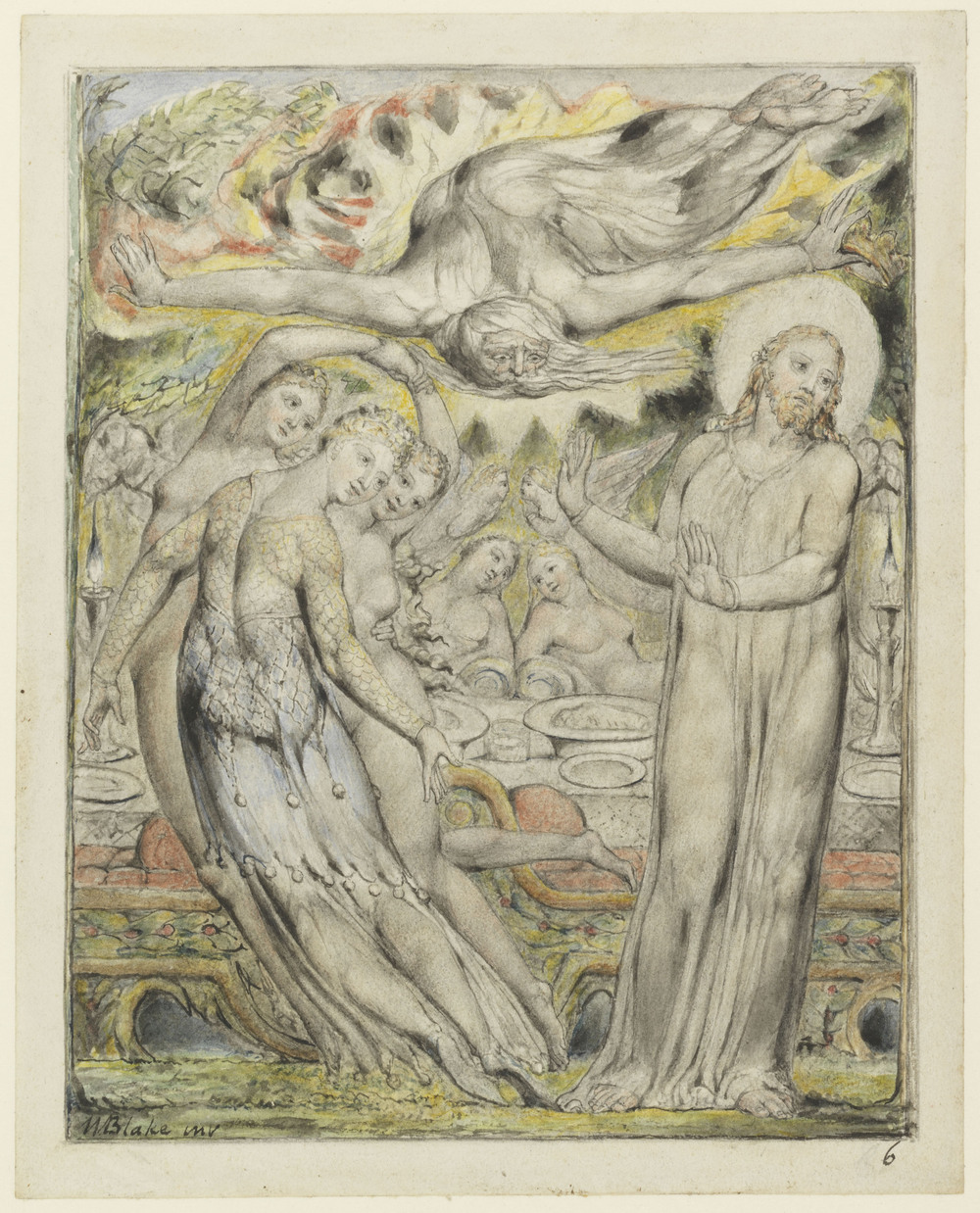
Christ refusing the banquet, William Blake (c. 1816–18). Illustration for Paradise Regained.

The Miltonic verse (also Miltonic epic or Miltonic blank verse) was a highly influential poetic style and structure popularized by John Milton. Although Milton wrote earlier poetry, his influence is largely grounded in his later poems: Paradise Lost, Paradise Regained, and Samson Agonistes.

== Miltonic verse ==
Milton's most notable works, including Paradise Lost, are written in blank verse: unrhymed iambic pentameter. He was not the first to use blank verse, which had been a mainstay of English drama since the 1561 play Gorboduc. His employment of the form outside drama, his frequent enjambment, and the relative looseness of his metre were very influential, and he became known for the style. The poet Robert Bridges analyzed Milton's versification in the monograph Milton's Prosody.

When Miltonic verse became popular, Samuel Johnson mocked Milton for inspiring bad blank verse, but he recognized that Milton's verse style was very influential. Poets such as Alexander Pope, whose final, incomplete work was intended to be written in the form, and John Keats, who complained that he relied too heavily on Milton, adopted and picked up various aspects of his poetry. In particular, Miltonic blank verse became the standard for those attempting to write English epics for centuries following the publication of Paradise Lost and his later poetry.

== Christian epic ==
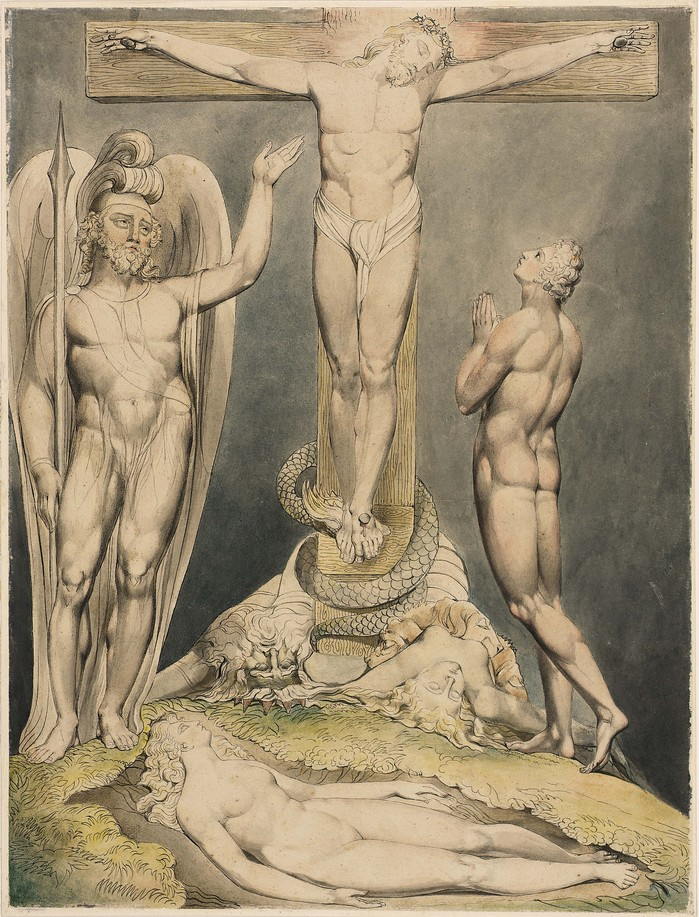
Michael Foretells the Crucifixion, William Blake (1808). William Blake's illustrations of Paradise Lost

Milton was not the first to write an epic poem on a Christian theme. There are some well-known precursors:

- La Battaglia celeste tra Michele e Lucifero (1568), by Antonio Alfani;
- La Sepmaine (1578), by Guillaume Du Bartas;
- La Gerusalemme liberata (1581), by Torquato Tasso;
- Angeleida (1590), by Erasmo di Valvasone;
- Le sette giornate del mondo creato (1607), by Tasso;
- De la creación del mundo (1615), by Alonso de Acevedo.

He was, on the other hand and according to Tobias Gregory:

the most theologically learned among early modern epic poets. He was, moreover, a theologian of great independence of mind, and one who developed his talents within a society where the problem of divine justice was debated with particular intensity.

He is able to establish divine action and his divine characters in a superior way to other Renaissance epic poets, including Ludovico Ariosto or Torquato Tasso.

In Paradise Lost Milton also ignores the traditional epic format, which started with Homer, of a plot based on a mortal conflict between opposing armies with deities watching over and occasionally interfering with the action. Instead, both divinity and mortal are involved in a conflict that, while momentarily ending in tragedy, offers a future salvation. In both Paradise Lost and Paradise Regained, Milton incorporates aspects of Lucan's epic model, the epic from the view of the defeated. Although he does not accept the model completely within Paradise Regained, he incorporates the "anti-Virgilian, anti-imperial epic tradition of Lucan". Milton goes further than Lucan in this belief and "Paradise Lost and Paradise Regained carry further, too, the movement toward and valorization of romance that Lucan's tradition had begun, to the point where Milton's poems effectively create their own new genre".

== Greek tragedy ==
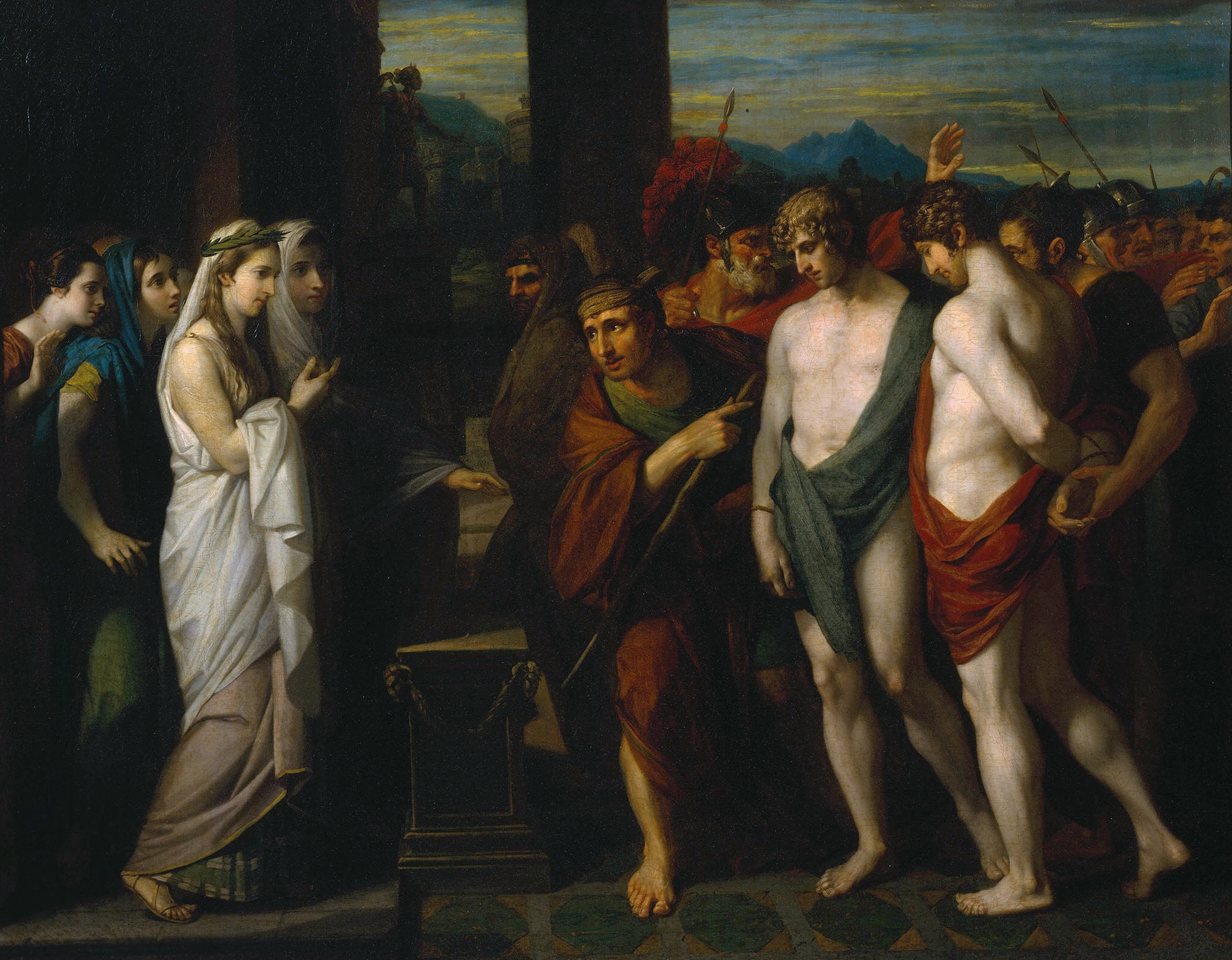
Pylades and Orestes Brought as Victims before Iphigenia, Benjamin West (1766). Iphigenia in Tauris, Euripides.

Milton defined his views of Greek tragedy in the preface to Samson Agonistes. His understanding of what would make an appropriate Christian tragedy combines aspects of Greek tragedy with Hebrew scripture, which alters both forms. Here again he was not an innovator, following for example the Adamus Exul (1601) of Hugo Grotius, and the Adamo (1615) of Giovanni Battista Andreini.

Milton believed that the Bible was a precursor to the classical forms relied on by the Greeks and Romans, and that the Bible accomplished what the Greeks and Romans wished in a more suitable manner. In his introduction, Milton discusses Aristotle's definition of tragedy and sets out his own paraphrase of it to connect it to Samson Agonistes:

Tragedy, as it was anciently composed, hath been ever held the gravest, moralest, and most profitable of all other poems: therefore said by Aristotle to be of power by raising pity and fear, or terror, to purge the mind of those and such-like passions, that is to temper and reduce them to just measure with a kind of delight, stirred up by reading or seeing those passions well imitated. Nor is nature wanting in her own effects to make good his assertion: for so in physic things of melancholic hue and quality are used against melancholy, sour against sour, salt to remove salt humors.

Milton continues, "Of the style and uniformity, and that commonly called the plot, whether intricate or explicit... they only will best judge who are not unacquainted with Aeschylus, Sophocles, and Euripides, the three tragic poets unequaled yet by any, and the best rule to all who endeavor to write tragedy". As with his Christian epics, Milton fused classical and Scriptural ideas in order to create better English literature.
