= Robert Bridges's theory of elision =

Robert Bridges's theory of elision is a theory of elision developed by the poet Robert Bridges, while he was working on a prosodic analysis of John Milton's poems Paradise Lost, Paradise Regained, and Samson Agonistes. Bridges describes his theory in thorough detail in his 1921 book Milton's Prosody. With his definition of poetic elision, Bridges is able to demonstrate that no line in Paradise Lost contains an extra unmetrical syllable mid-line; that is, any apparent extra mid-line syllable can be explained as an example of Bridges's elision.

== Milton's elision in Paradise Lost ==
Bridges identifies the following kinds of elision:

1. vowel elisions
2. elision through H
3. poetic elision of semi-vowels
4. elision through R
5. elision through L
6. elision through N

=== Vowel elisions ===
Bridges identifies two basic types of vowel elision

1. the y-glide
2. the w-glide

==== The y-glide ====
Bridges identifies three situations where this could occur:

1. where the first syllable is stressed, such as in riot
2. where the second syllable is stressed, such as in humiliation
3. where neither vowel is stressed, such as in Michael

==== The w-glide ====
Bridges identifies three situations where this could occur:

1. where the first syllable is stressed, such as in ruin
2. where the second syllable is stressed; he finds no indisputable example of this in Paradise Lost but suggests fluctuats in IX.668 may be an example.
3. where neither vowel is stressed, such as in virtuous

=== Elision through H ===
Bridges identifies several places where Milton apparently glides through a consonantal H. For example:

For still they knew, and ought to have still remembered (X.12)

In Gems and wanton dress; to the Harp they sing (XI.579)

=== Poetic elision of semi-vowels ===
Bridges identifies that words such as schism, prism, chasm, spasm are usually counted as monosyllables, despite the fact that in spoken language we vocalize the m separately; that is, as though prism were written pris'm.

=== Elision through R ===
Bridges states that if two unstressed syllables are separated by an r then there may be elision.

=== Elision through L ===
Bridges states that if two unstressed syllables are separated by an l then there may be elision.

=== Elision through N ===
Bridges states that if two unstressed syllables are separated by an n then there may be elision.

== Milton's later relaxation of the rules of elision ==
Bridges notes that the Milton's concept of elision is broadened in Paradise Regained and Samson Agonistes. Specifically, he observes the following types of elision:

- through an M (where preceding and succeeding syllables are unstressed)
- via synaloepha of a final vocalic y with an initial consonantal y
- from a short unaccented i, where the following vowel is unstressed, through the following consonants:
  - through a T (4 instances)
  - through a M (1 instance)
  - through a F (1 instance)
  - through a D (1 instance)
  - through a SH (1 instance)
  - through a ST (1 instance)

These last two, Bridges describes as "quite abhorrent to the style of Paradise Lost"

== Notes ==
1. See page 47 of Milton's Prosody.
