= Neo-Miltonic syllabics =

Poetry meter

Neo-Miltonic Syllabics is a meter devised by Robert Bridges. It was first employed by the poet in a group of poems composed between 1921 and 1925, and collected in his book New Verse (1925). In "Kate's Mother," included in New Verse, Bridges had found that form which he later employed in The Testament of Beauty, a book-length poem written when he was over eighty. He arrived at that syllabic meter used in the New Verse collection by way of his earlier detailed analysis of John Milton's versification in Milton's Prosody (1889, rev. ed. 1921).

The first poem in this form was "Poor Poll" which F. T. Prince regarded as the best illustration of Bridges' meter. Prince later adopted Neo-Miltonic Syllabics when writing his own work, Afterword on Rupert Brooke (1976).
