= Yattendon (disambiguation) =

Yattendon may refer to:

- Yattendon an estate village in the county of Berkshire, England
- Yattendon Castle a fortified manor house in Yattendon, England
- Yattendon Group a British-based private company
- Yattendon Hymnal an English hymnal
