= Milton's Prosody =

Milton's Prosody, with a chapter on Accentual Verse and Notes is a non-fiction book by the English literary critic Robert Bridges. It was first published by Oxford University Press in 1889, and a final revised edition was published in 1921.

Bridges begins with a detailed empirical analysis of the blank verse of Paradise Lost, and then examines the changes in Milton's practice in his later poems Paradise Regained and Samson Agonistes. A third section deals with 'obsolete mannerisms'. The final section of the book presents a new system of prosody for accentual verse.

== Writing of the book ==
Bridges had been asked by Henry Beeching, his local vicar, to write a preface for an edition of Paradise Lost that Beeching was preparing for sixth-form pupils. Beeching wanted something to counter the prevailing da-DUM-da-DUM style of reading, that artificially distorted words to fit the regular pattern of the iambic pentameter rhythm. When Gerard Manley Hopkins visited Bridges in mid August 1886, they discussed Bridges' work on the preface. The contents of the book evolved over decades through several published versions:

- Bridges, Robert (1887). "On the Elements of Milton's Blank Verse in Paradise Lost". In Beeching, H. C. (ed.). Paradise Lost, Book I. Oxford: Clarendon Press.
- Bridges, Robert (1889). On the Prosody of Paradise Regained and Samson Agonistes: Being a Supplement to the paper "On the Elements of Milton's Blank Verse in Paradise Lost," which is reprinted in the Rev. H. C. Beeching's edition of Paradise Lost, Book I, Clarendon Press, Oxford. Oxford: Basil Blackwell. (published anonymously)
- Bridges, Robert (1893). Milton's Prosody: An Examination of the rules of the Blank Verse in Milton's Later Poems, with an Account of the Versification of Samson Agonistes and General Notes. Oxford: Clarendon Press.

(A combined revision of the 1887 & 1889 works.)

- Bridges, Robert (1901). Milton's Prosody, & Classical Meters in English Verse, by William Johnson Stone. Oxford: Oxford University Press.

(Classical Meters in English Verse is not directly related to Milton's Prosody, but was appended to the book because of Bridges's interest in the topic and "as a memorial to Stone's untimely death".)

- Bridges, Robert (1904). "Miltonic Elision". The Athenaeum (January 1904): 83–84, 113–14, 147–48.

(3 brief papers which grew out of the study.)

- Bridges, Robert (1921). Milton's Prosody: With a Chapter on Accentual Verse and Notes (Revised final ed.). Oxford: Clarendon Press.

(The definitive edition, revised, with Classical Meters... removed, and a new chapter on Accentual Verse.)

== The Prosody of Paradise Lost ==
Bridges shows that:

1. there are no lines with fewer than ten syllables in Paradise Lost
2. with a suitable definition of elision, there are no mid-line extra-metrical syllables
3. the stresses may fall at any point in the line,
4. although most lines have the standard five stresses, there are examples of lines with only three and four stresses.

Thus according to Bridges' analysis Milton was writing a form of syllabic verse. At the time this was a controversial thesis. George Saintsbury disagreed with Bridges, and stated that Milton had simply been using standard extra-metrical liberties, but Bridges was able to answer this objection by showing that every single instance in the poem of such a variation from the norm could be explained by his natural definition of elision; this would be extremely unlikely to be the case if the poet had simply been allowing himself extra-metrical variations as described by Saintsbury. Bridges took the very restricted range of Milton's variations to be a proof of his thesis.

== The Prosody of Paradise Regained and Samson Agonistes ==
Bridges showed that Milton further broadened his concept of elision in his later works. Bridges' investigation of Milton's twelve syllable lines led him to ideas of prosody embodied in his own Neo-Miltonic syllabics.

== On Obsolete Mannerisms ==
=== Recession of Accent ===
Bridges discusses the obsolete practice of recession of accent. The rule being that "disyllabic adjectives and participles accented on the last syllable will shift their accent back if they occur before a noun accented on the first syllable."

Bridges bases much of his account of Recession of Accent on the work of Alexander Schmidt's analysis of Shakespeare's practice. Schmidt takes, for example, an adjective such as 'complete' and shows that it is used with the normal accent on the second syllable in lines such as:

He is complete in feature and in mind (Gent. ii 4.73)

And then proceeds to find numerous examples where the stress is changed according to the rule, thus:

A maid of grace and complete majesty. (L.L.L. i. 1.137)

and

Than all the complete armour that thou wear'st. (Rich 3rd iv. 4.189)

Bridges lists a number of clear example of recession of accent in Milton's earlier work, such as:

The sublime notion, and high mystery

but then goes on to note the very frequent occurrence of the rhythm ⌣ ⌣ – – (that is, xx// ) in Milton's verse, a rhythm that Milton would have taken from Shakespeare, as at the end of the following line from A Midsummer Night's Dream:

The ploughman lost his sweat, and the green corn

Milton's frequent use of this rhythm undermines any case for supposing recession of accent played a role in Milton's later metrical practice. Bridges argues that Milton excluded the 'licence' of recession of accent because it would have given rise to uncertainty about where a stress should lie. He observes that the words complete, extreme, serene, and sublime occur twenty-four times in Paradise Lost, Paradise Regained, and Samson Agonistes, and in each case the accent is on the second syllable, whereas each of these words appears only once in Comus and there 'suffers' recession of accent.

== The Prosody of Accentual Verse ==
In this final section, Bridges describes a prosody of accentual verse.

=== Terms and notation ===
Bridges classifies the following types of syllable (alternative symbols have been added for browsers that do not display symbols correctly):

Symbol	Alternative	Syllable Type	Description
⋀	^	Stressed	Syllable carries the stress
–	–	Heavy	Is genuinely long, slows down the reading. For example: broad, bright, down.
⌣	~	Light	All syllables with short vowels, even those that would be long 'by position' in Classical terms. That is, if the consonants around a short vowel do not genuinely retard the syllable then it will be counted 'light'. Light also includes all classically short syllables. For example the second syllables of 'brighter' and 'brightest' are both light, despite the consonants in the latter.

Bridges also has a shorter version of the 'Light' symbol for 'very short' syllables. We can use ⌵ ('.').

=== Rules ===
Bridges lists six "rules" for accentual verse. He states (p. 89) "These 'laws' are merely the tabulation of what my ear finds in English stressed or accentual verse". The rules are as follows:

1. the stress governs the rhythm
2. the stresses must all be true speech-stresses
3. a stress has more carrying power over the syllable next to it, than it has over a syllable removed from it by an intervening syllable
4. stress has a peculiarly strong attraction towards verbal unity and for its own proclitics and enclitics
5. a stress will not carry a heavy syllable which is removed from it by another syllable. Here Bridges cites several lines from Shelley which violate this rule, such as: "Each and all like ministering angels were."
6. a stress will not carry more than one heavy or two light syllables on the same side of it

=== List of common stress units ===
Bridges lists the common stress units or feet:

1st	Bare Stress	⋀	^
2nd	The 2 falling disyllabic feet	⋀–	^-
		⋀⌣	^~
3rd	The 2 rising disyllabic feet	–⋀	-^
		⌣⋀	~^
4th	The britannics or mid-stress trisyllabics	⌣⋀⌣	~^~
		–⋀⌣	-^~
		⌣⋀–	~^-
		–⋀–	-^-
5th	The falling and rising trisyllabics	⌣⌣⋀	~~^
		⋀⌣⌣	^~~
6th	The quadrisyllabics	⌣⋀⌣⌣	~^~~
		–⋀⌣⌣	-^~~
		⌣⌣⋀⌣	~~^~
		⌣⌣⋀–	~~^-
7th	The five syllable foot	⌣⌣⋀⌣⌣	~~^~~
