= Accentual verse =

Type of poetic stress pattern

In poetry, accentual verse has a fixed number of stresses per line regardless of the number of syllables that are present. It is common in languages that are stress-timed, such as English, as opposed to syllabic verse which is common in syllable-timed languages, such as French.

== Children's poetry ==
Accentual verse is particularly common in children's poetry; nursery rhymes and the less well-known skipping-rope rhymes are the most common form of accentual verse in the English Language. The following poem, "Baa Baa Black Sheep," has two stresses in each line but a varying number of unstressed syllables. Bold represents stressed syllables, and the number of syllables in each line is noted.

Baa, baa, black sheep, (4)
Have you any wool? (5)
Yes sir, yes sir, (4)
Three bags full; (3)
One for the mas-ter, (5)
And one for the dame, (5)
And one for the lit-tle boy (7)
Who lives down the lane. (5)

In this case, "boy" is part of the metrical foot in which "lives" is stressed, through elision.

Accentual verse derives its musical qualities from its flexibility with unstressed syllables and tends to follow the natural speech patterns of English.

== History ==
=== English ===
Accentual verse was a traditionally common prosody in Germany, Scandinavia, Iceland and Britain. Accentual verse has been widespread in English poetry since its earliest recording, with Old English poetry written in a special form of accentual verse termed alliterative verse, of which Beowulf is a notable example. Anglo-Saxon poetry generally added two further basic elements to the basic four-beat accentual verse pattern: alliteration of three of the four beats, and a medial pause (caesura). Anglo-Saxon poets made frequent use of epithets to achieve the desired alliteration, and had various other more complex rules and forms, though these have not been as popular in later poetry.

Accentual verse lost its dominant position in English poetry following the Norman conquest of England when French forms, with their syllabic emphasis, gained prominence. Accentual verse continued in common use in all forms of Middle English poetry until the codification of accentual-syllabic verse in Elizabethan poetry; thereafter it largely vanished from literary poetry for three hundred years while remaining popular in folk poetry. A notable example from this period is William Langland's Piers Ploughman, here retaining the alliteration:

I loked on my left half || as þe lady me taughte
And was war of a woman || worþeli ycloþed.
I looked on my left side || as the lady me taught
and was aware of a woman || worthily clothed.

A well-known source for accentual verse from the post-Elizabethan period is Mother Goose's Melody (1765). Accentual verse experienced a revival in the 19th century with the development ("discovery") of sprung rhythm by Gerard Manley Hopkins. Although Hopkins' example was not widely adopted in literary circles, accentual verse did catch on, with some poets flirting with the form, and later poets more strictly following it. A modern codification was given by Robert Bridges in 1921, in his Bridges' Prosody of Accentual Verse section of Milton's Prosody. Modern literary use includes W. H. Auden, and it has notably been advanced by Dana Gioia.

Outside of children's poetry and literary poetry, accentual verse remains popular in verse composed for oral presentation, such as cowboy poetry and rap.

==== Prosody of Accentual Verse in English ====
In modern literary use, in addition to the detailed codification given in Bridges' Prosody of Accentual Verse, three basic rules are followed:

1. Four stresses per line;
2. A medial pause, with two stress on each side;
3. Generally, three of the four stresses alliterate.

Some variations and other subtleties are found:

- Rather than a triple alliteration in a line, having two pairs of double alliterations on either side of the pause, or only having a single double alliteration, with one alliterating stress on each side of the pause.
- Alliteration falls on the (first) stressed syllable of a word, not the first syllable of the word.
- Minor stresses are often eliminated to reduce ambiguity.
- While individual lines may have a regular syllabic structure, this is not kept constant over the poem – only the stress pattern is consistent – as otherwise the poem becomes accentual-syllabic verse.

Accentual-syllabic verse is an extension of accentual verse that also fixes the syllables.

=== Polish ===
In Polish literature, as in French one, syllabic verse is dominant. Accentual verse was introduced into Polish poetry in 20th century. Jan Kasprowicz was the first poet to use accentual verse in his book Księga ubogich (The Book of the Poor) that was published in 1916. He used lines with three stresses.

Rzadko na moich wargach -
Niech dziś to warga ma wyzna -
Jawi się krwią przepojony,
Najdroższy wyraz: Ojczyzna.

— Jan Kasprowicz, Rzadko na moich wargach

The poet wrote, that the word dearest to him, "mother-country", is on his lips very rarely. The scansion is:

' x x ' x ' x
x ' x ' x x ' x
' x x ' x x ' x
x ' x ' x x ' x

This pattern became the most popular. There is also six-stress pattern. This was used among others by Julian Tuwim.

== See also ==
- Milton's Prosody
