= Quaternion (disambiguation) =

Quaternion can refer to:

== Mathematics ==
- Quaternions, a number system that extends the complex numbers.
  - Quaternion rotation, systems for describing how rotation groups and quaternions interact
  - Quaternion group (Q_{8}), a non-abelian group of order 8 that describes the quaternions

== Symbols ==
- Imperial quaternions (heraldry of the Holy Roman Empire)
  - Quaternion Eagle

== Military uses ==
- A group of four soldiers in the Roman legion
- A fireteam

== Other ==
- Quaternion (gathering), four folded sheets as a unit in bookbinding
- Quaternion (poetry), a style of poetry with four parts
