= F. T. Prince =

British poet and academic

Frank Templeton Prince (13 September 1912 – 7 August 2003) was a British poet and academic, known generally for his best-known poem Soldiers Bathing, written during the Second World War in 1942, which has been frequently included in anthologies. He was born in Kimberley, South Africa. His father Henry (Harry) Prince (formerly Prinz) was from the East End of London, of Dutch-Jewish descent, while his mother was Scottish. He was educated at the Christian Brothers College in Kimberley, then Balliol College, Oxford. He had a visiting position at Princeton University. In World War II he was involved in intelligence work at Bletchley Park.

He married in 1943, and took an academic position after the war at the University of Southampton, where he settled. In the mid-1970s, he taught at the University of the West Indies in Jamaica, as well as Brandeis University in the United States and Sana'a University, Yemen.

Prince's early work drew praise from T.S. Eliot, who was then editor at Faber and Faber. Eliot published some of his poetry in The Criterion before publishing Prince's first book Poems in 1938. In work such as the Afterword on Rupert Brooke his interest in the metrical ideas of Robert Bridges is evident.

F. T. Prince died in Southampton in 2003.

== Works ==
- Poems (1938) Faber and Faber
- The Italian Element in Milton's Verse (1951) criticism
- Soldiers Bathing (1954)
- The Doors of Stone: Poems, 1938–1962 (1963)
- Memoirs in Oxford (1970) verse autobiography
- Drypoints of the Hasidim (1975)
- Afterword on Rupert Brooke (1976)
- A Last Attachment (1979)
- Collected Poems (1979)
- Later On (1983)
- Not A Paris Review Interview (1986)
- Walks in Rome (1987) verse autobiography
- Collected Poems 1935–1992 (1993, Carcanet Press)
- In Keats Country (2015, Perdika Press) previously unpublished poems
- Memoirs of Caravaggio (2015, Perdika Press) previously unpublished
