= Poor Poll =

1921 poem by Robert Bridges

"Poor Poll" is a poem written by Robert Bridges in 1921, published in June 1923, and later collected in his book New Verse (1925). The poem is the first example of Bridges' neo-Miltonic syllabics.

Bridges composed "Poor Poll" at the same time that T. S. Eliot was writing The Waste Land. Both Eliot and Bridges were searching for a new relationship with poetic rhythm that would also allow them to incorporate the interests of modernism, including phrases in foreign languages. Bridges wrote in a later essay, "It was partly this wish for liberty to use various tongues that made me address my first experiment to a parrot, but partly also my wish to discover how a low setting of scene and diction would stand; because one of the main limitations of English verse is that its accentual (dot and go one) bumping is apt to make ordinary words ridiculous."

Although some scholars have suggested that in the poem (dated "June 3, 1921"), Bridges consciously parodied Eliot's Waste Land (first published in October 1922), scholars generally are now in agreement that the works were composed contemporaneously. Nevertheless, both poems are macaronic and include classical allusions and phrases in foreign languages (including French, German, Latin, and Ancient Greek). Also like Eliot's work, Bridges' was published with a set of footnotes supplied by the poet. Bridges' footnotes are headed "Metrical Elucidations" and offer advice on the poem's scansion as well as explanation for some of the allusions.

Here are a few lines from Bridges' poem:

Why ask? You cannot know. 'Twas by no choice of yours
that you mischanged for monkeys' man's society,
'twas that British sailor drove you from Paradise —
Εἴθ᾿ ὤφελ᾿ Ἀργους μὴ διαπτάσθαι σκάφος!
I'd hold embargoes on such a ghastly traffic.

I am writing verses to you & grieve that you sh^{d} be

absolument incapable de les comprendre,
Tu, Polle, nescis ista nec potes scire: —
