= Eros and Psyche (Robert Bridges) =

1885 tragic and romantic narrative poem

Eros and Psyche is a narrative poem with strong romantic and tragic themes which was first published in 1885 by Robert Bridges. Bridges was licensed as a physician in England until 1882 when he was forced to retire due to a lung disease. He would then devote the rest of his life to literary research and writing and would be appointed as Poet Laureate of the United Kingdom in 1913.

Bridges' Eros and Psyche retells the Eros (Cupid) and Psyche myth first recorded by Lucius Apuleius in his book The Golden Ass. The work received critical acclaim; Coventry Patmore expressing the opinion that Bridges's version would become the standard form of Apuleius myth.

== Synopsis ==
As Psyche - the youngest daughter of a petty king of Crete- grows into the full flower of womanhood, she becomes worshiped by the common people as the living apotheosis of Aphrodite. Aphrodite - noting her worshipers forsaking her temples to instead ask for the princess' blessings - demands speedy vengeance. Commanding her own son (Cupid) for her purpose: Aphrodite orders him to make the Princess Psyche fall in love with some ugly, worthless vagabond. Cupid departs upon his mission.

Cupid's capriciousness - his delight in making gods and men love someone unobtainable - is amply repaid by the Fates: who now condemn him to experience the same. Arriving in Crete and seeing Psyche: Cupid himself falls helplessly in love with her, and resolves to marry her himself and protect her from his own mother's jealous ire. Cupid whisks his beloved Psyche away to a secret dwelling place - conjured into existence by his own divine powers: here Psyche can remain in safety, being protected watched and served by friendly spirits.

== Structure ==
The poem is divided into twelve cantos - one for each of the twelve months of the year - which gives the poem a certain, almost "pastoral" feel. The number of stanzas in each canto equals the number of days in that month: so the first canto March has 31 stanzas, the second canto April has 30 stanzas, and so on. Each stanza is a septet (i.e. comprises exactly seven lines) which follow the same end-rhyming schema of ABABCCB.

== Critical reception ==
While writing for the St. James Gazette in 1885, Coventry Patmore wrote a review on Bridges' version of Eros and Psyche. Patmore stated that Bridges's version of Apuleius's myth "will probably be the standard transcript" because he "takes the story as it stands." Patmore also adds that "Mr. Bridges writes neither above nor below himself.

Author C.S. Lewis also makes a mention of Bridges' Eros and Psyche in his book Till We Have Faces in the Notes section at the end of the book. Lewis says that authors such as Bridges and William Morris re-tell the Apuleius myth with small embellishments and Apuleius remains the "source. Not an influence or a model.

In a study on Robert Bridges done by Albert Guerard, Guerard compares Bridges' version to the original tale by Apuleius. Guerard points out that Bridges made embellishments the Apuleius myth to make the tale appear more lucid and easier for the reader to understand. Guerard also compares certain excerpts from both the Apuleius version as well as Bridges'.
