= Elizabeth Daryush =

English poet (1887–1977)

Elizabeth Daryush (8 December 1887 – 7 April 1977) was an English poet.

== Life ==
Daryush was the daughter of Robert and Monica Bridges; her maternal grandfather was Alfred Waterhouse. She married Ali Akbar Daryush, a Persian government official whom she had met when he was studying at the University of Oxford, and thereafter spent some time in Persia; most of her life was spent at the Bridges' family home, Stockwell, in Boars Hill, outside Oxford.

The garden of their Boars Hill home was left by Ali as a memorial garden, named after Elizabeth, and managed by the Oxford Preservation Trust.

== Writings ==
=== Poetry ===
Daryush, daughter of English poet laureate Robert Bridges (some of her early work was published as Elizabeth Bridges), followed her father's lead not only in choosing poetry as her life's work but also in the traditional style of poetry she chose to write. The themes of her work are often critical of the upper classes and the social injustice their privilege levied upon others. This characteristic was not present in her early work, including her first two books of poems, published under the name Elizabeth Bridges, which appeared while she was still in her twenties. According to John Finlay, writing in the Dictionary of Literary Biography, Daryush's "early poetry is preoccupied with rather conventional subject matter and owes a great deal to the Edwardians."

=== Syllabic style ===
Daryush took her father's experiment in syllabic verse a step farther by making it less experimental; whereas Bridges' syllable count excluded elidable syllables, producing some variation in the total number of pronounced syllables per line, Daryush's was strictly aural, counting all syllables actually sounded when the poem was read aloud. It is for her successful experiments with syllabic meter that Daryush is best known to contemporary readers, as exampled in her poem Accentedal in the quaternion form. Yvor Winters, the poet and critic, considered Daryush more successful in writing syllabics than was her father, noting that her poem Still-Life was her finest syllabic experiment, and also a companion-piece to Children of Wealth. Winters considered the social context of Still Life, which is nowhere mentioned, yet from which the poem draws its power.

=== Characteristics ===
Beyond its social content, Daryush's work is also recognized for a consistent and well-defined personal vision. As Finlay noted, "For her. . .poetry always dealt with the 'stubborn fact' of life as it is, and the only consolations it offered were those of understanding and a kind of half-Christian, half-stoical acceptance of the inevitable." However, he also argued that Daryush's best poems transcend such fatalism, "dealing with the moral resources found in one's own being. . .and a recognition of the beauties in the immediate, ordinary world around us." In many of her terse short poems, there is formal and intellectual mastery; her last, longest and most ambitious poem, 'Air and Variations,' was a formal tribute to Gerard Manley Hopkins Daryush has been described as a pioneer technical innovator, a poet of the highest dedication and seriousness whose poetry grapples with life's intensest issues.

== Works ==
- Charitessi 1911 (1912), published anonymously, Cambridge
- Verses by Elizabeth Bridges (1916), Oxford, Blackwells
- Sonnets from Hafez and other Verses (1921) as Elizabeth Bridges, Oxford, OUP
- Verses (1930), Oxford, OUP
- Verses, Second Book (1932), Oxford, OUP
- Verses, Third Book (1933), Oxford, OUP
- Verses, Fourth Book (1934), Oxford, OUP
- Selected Poems, (1935), Macmillan's Contemporary Poets, London
- The Last Man and Other Verses (Verses, Fifth Book) (1936)
- Verses, Sixth Book (1938)
- Selected Poems (1948) edited and with foreword by Yvor Winters, New York
- Verses, Seventh Book (1971) Carcanet Press
- Selected Poems from Verses I-VI (1972), Carcanet Press
- Collected Poems (1976) Carcanet Press, introduction by Donald Davie
