= Yattendon Hymnal =

1899 Anglican hymnal

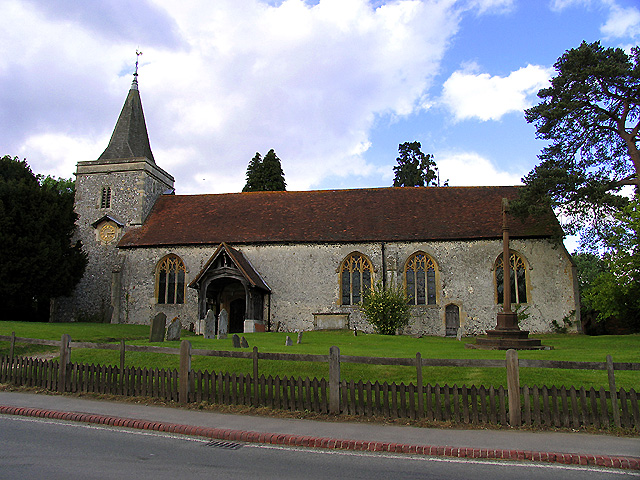
- Church in Yattendon for which the hymnal was compiled
- Editor: Robert Bridges; Harry Ellis Wooldridge
- Language: English
- Subject: Religious sheet music
- Publisher: Oxford University Press
- Publication date: 1899
- Publication place: United Kingdom
- Media type: Print

The Yattendon Hymnal was a small but influential hymnal compiled by Robert Bridges and H. Ellis Wooldridge assisted by Monica Bridges for the Church of England parish church at Yattendon, Berkshire, England where Monica's family lived. Totalling 100 items, it first appeared in four separate parts from 1894, culminating in a single, combined version in 1899. That same year Bridges also published the accompanying A practical discourse on some principles of hymn-singing.

While Bridges was primarily a poet (he would later become Poet Laureate from 1913) he was also alert to the musical settings of texts, including hymns and was associated with musicians such as John Stainer, Charles Villiers Stanford, Hubert Parry, Frank Bridge and Gustav Holst. From 1885 to 1894 he made himself responsible for the music of the village church. He had become deeply dissatisfied with the state of English hymnody in the late Victorian period:

We are content to have our hymn-manuals stuffed with the sort of music which, merging the distinction between sacred and profane, seems designed to make the worldly man feel at home, rather than to reveal to him something of the life beyond his knowledge, compositions full of cheap emotional effects and bad experiments made to be cast aside, the works of the purveyors of marketable fashion, always pleased with themselves, and always to be derided by the succeeding generation.

The hymnal's primary intended use would have been for unaccompanied singing at the choir stall or lectern, and its design, perhaps deliberately, hindered its use at the organ console, or even by the congregation. The Palestinian harmonization used in the hymnal's 80 plain songs was created by Wooldridge assisted by Monica Bridges. The Fell types used in the hymnal was a revival of a 16th century typeset created by the calligrapher Monica and her husband.

The music is the primary ground of selection. Thirteen tunes are plainsong, sixteen psalm tunes from Geneva, seven tunes by Tallis, eight by Gibbons, eight other psalm tunes from the sixteenth century, and ten from the seventeenth, eleven German chorales, nine tunes by Clarke, and four by Croft. There are three miscellaneous eighteenth-century tunes and one early Italian one. There was little from the Victorian tune writers; rather he included seven tunes by co-editor Wooldridge.

Forty-eight of the hymn texts are substantially by Bridges as translator. Several, such as All My Hope on God is Founded and O sacred Head, sore wounded remain in current use.

The hymnal would subsequently influence Ralph Vaughan Williams as editor of the major English Hymnal of 1906.

== See also ==
- Anglican church music
- List of English-language hymnals by denomination
