= Quaternion (poetry) =

Quaternion is a poetry style in which the theme is divided into four parts.

== Characteristics ==
Each part of a quaternion explores the complementary natures of the theme or subject. The word quaternion is derived from the Latin word quaterni, meaning "four by four". The poem may be in any poetic form and 'offers poets the chance to experiment with varied rhetorical structures'.

== Examples ==
Anne Bradstreet, America's first significant poet, wrote four quaternions:

- "Four Seasons"
- "Four Elements" (Fire, Earth, Water and Air)
- "Of the Four Humours of Man's Constitution" (sanguine, pragmatic, choleric and melancholic)
- "Of the Four Ages of Man" (Childhood, Youth, Manhood and Old Age)
- "The Four Monarchies" (Assyrian, Persian, Grecian, and Roman)

Elizabeth Daryush, known for her syllabic verse, used the quaternion form in her poem "Accentedal".
