= Syllabic verse =

Poetic form based on syllable count

Syllabic verse is a poetic form having a fixed or constrained number of syllables per line, while stress, quantity, or tone play a distinctly secondary role—or no role at all—in the verse structure. It is common in languages that are syllable-timed, such as French or Finnish, as opposed to stress-timed languages such as English, in which accentual verse and accentual-syllabic verse are more common.

== Overview ==
Many European languages have significant syllabic verse traditions, notably Italian, Spanish, French, and the Baltic and Slavic languages. These traditions often permeate both folk and literary verse, and have evolved gradually over hundreds or thousands of years. In a sense, the metrical tradition is older than the languages themselves, since it (like the languages) descended from Proto-Indo-European.

It is often implied, incorrectly, that word stress plays no part in the syllabic prosody of these languages. While word stress in most of these languages is much less prominent than in English or German, it is present both in the language and in the meter. Very broadly speaking, syllabic meters in these languages follow the same pattern:

1. Line length: The line is defined by the number of syllables it contains.
2. Hemistich length: All but the shortest lines are divided into part-lines (hemistichs); each hemistich also contains a specific number of syllables, and ends with a word-boundary (this means that the hemistich cannot end in the middle of a word).
3. Hemistich markers: The ends of the hemistichs are marked and contrasted by an obligatory stress: a specific syllable position near the end of each hemistich must be filled by a stressed syllable, and this position typically differs between the first and second hemistich, so that they are audibly distinct.
4. Marker reinforcement: Often the syllables immediately before or after the obligatory stresses are obligatorily unstressed to further emphasize the stress.
5. Other structure: Further rules may be imposed, such as additional word-boundary constraints on certain syllabic positions, or allowances for extrametrical syllables; and further interlinear structure may be present (such as rhyme and stanza).

Linguistically, the most significant exceptions to this pattern are in Latvian, Lithuanian, and Serbian verse. These verses retain the older quantitative markers using long and short syllables at the ends of hemistichs, instead of stressed and unstressed.

Due to variations in line length, hemistichs, obligatory stress positions, and other factors among verse traditions, and because each language provides words with different rhythmic characteristics, this basic metrical template is realized with great variety. A sequence of syllables that is metrical in one verse tradition will typically not fit in another.

=== Perception of syllable count ===
Humans can perceive the number of members in a small set without actually counting them or mentally breaking them into subsets, with the upper limit of this ability estimated between 5 and 9 units. This seems to hold true in sequences of audible stimuli (e.g. syllables in a line of verse). Therefore, it is no surprise that syllabic hemistichs tend to be very short (typically 4 to 8 syllables), and to be grouped and separated from their neighbors by markers like stress, word boundaries, and rhyme.

== English ==
Syllabic verse in English is quite distinct from that in most other languages, historically, structurally, and perceptually.

Historically, English syllabics have not evolved over time from native practice, but rather are the inventions of literate poets, primarily in the 20th century. Structurally, syllable counts are not bound by tradition. Even very long lines are not divided into hemistichs, and the verse exhibits none of the markers usually found in other syllabic meters (with the occasional exception of end-rhyme), relying for its measure solely on total count of syllables in the line. Perceptually, "it is very doubtful that verse lines regulated by nothing more than identity of numbers of syllables would be perceived by auditors as verse ... Further, absent the whole notion of meter as pattern, one may question whether syllabic verse is 'metrical' at all." In English, the difficulty of perceiving even brief isosyllabic lines as rhythmically equivalent is aggravated by the inordinate power of stressed syllables.

In English, unstressed syllables are much weaker and shorter than stressed syllables, and their vowels are often phonetically reduced (pronounced as the rather indistinct schwa—"uh"—rather than fully sounded). Moreover, auditors tend to perceive word stresses to fall at equal intervals in time, making English a perceptually "stress-timed" language; it seems that the same amount of time occurs between stresses. So the conventional patterns of accentual and accentual-syllabic English verse are perceived as regularly rhythmic, whereas to the listener, syllabic verse generally is not distinguishable from free verse.

Thus, in English, syllabic technique does not convey a metrical rhythm. Instead, it is a compositional device primarily of importance to the author, perhaps noticed by the alert reader, and imperceptible to the hearer.

A number of English-language poets in the Modernist tradition experimented with syllabic verse. These include Marianne Moore, Dylan Thomas, Louis Zukofsky, Kenneth Rexroth and Thom Gunn. Some more traditional poets have also used syllabics, including Elizabeth Daryush and Robert Bridges. Bridges's Testament of Beauty is the longest syllabic poem in English.

=== Examples ===
Dylan Thomas's "In my craft or sullen art" is an example of syllabic verse in English: it has seven syllables in each line (except the last), but no consistent stress pattern.

In my craft or sullen art
Exercised in the still night
When only the moon rages
And the lovers lie abed
With all their griefs in their arms,
I labour by singing light
Not for ambition or bread
Or the strut and trade of charms
On the ivory stages
But for the common wages
Of their most secret heart.

Because of its consistent short lines marked with end-rhyme, these lines could conceivably be heard as 7-syllable groups by a listener; however, they would be more likely to be perceived as (usually) 3-stress lines.

Syllabic poetry can also take a stanzaic form, as in Marianne Moore's poem "No Swan So Fine", in which the corresponding lines of each stanza have the same number of syllables. This poem comprises 2 stanzas, each with lines of 7, 8, 6, 8, 8, 5, and 9 syllables respectively. The indented lines rhyme. As in accentual-syllabic verse, there is some flexibility in how one counts syllables. For example, syllables with y- or w-glides may count as one or two syllables depending on the poet's preference. Moore counts "Dahlias" (a y-glide) as 2 syllables, and "flowers" (a w-glide) as 1.

"No water so still as the
dead fountains of Versailles." No swan,
with swart blind look askance
and gondoliering legs, so fine
as the chintz china one with fawn-
brown eyes and toothed gold
collar on to show whose bird it was.

Lodged in the Louis Fifteenth
Candelabrum-tree of cockscomb-
tinted buttons, dahlias,
sea urchins, and everlastings,
it perches on the branching foam
of polished sculptured
flowers—at ease and tall. The king is dead.

Because these lines are longer, irregular, and frequently enjambed ("as the / dead fountains"), it is quite clear that the symmetry of syllables is not meant to be audible. Moore's use of end-rhyme is telling. Only 2 lines in each stanza are rhymed: these are emphasized for the reader by indentation, but hidden from the listener by radical enjambment ("fawn- / brown" and "coxcomb- / tinted").

Elizabeth Daryush, known for her use of syllabic verse, used the quaternion form for her celebrated syllabic verse poem "Accentedal".

== French ==
The modern French language does not have a significant stress accent (as English does). This means that the French metric line is generally determined by the number of syllables. The most common metric lengths are the ten-syllable line (décasyllabe), the eight-syllable line (octosyllabe) and the twelve-syllable line (Alexandrin).

Special syllable counting rules apply to French poetry. A silent or mute "e" counts as a syllable before a consonant, but not before a vowel (where h aspiré counts as a consonant). When it falls at the end of a line, the mute "e" is hypermetrical (outside the count of syllables).

== Polish ==
Polish syllabic verse is similar to French. The most common lengths are the thirteen-syllable line (trzynastozgłoskowiec or Polish alexandrine), the eleven-syllable line (jedenastozgłoskowiec) and eight-syllable line (ośmiozgłoskowiec). The rules of Polish verse were established in the 16th century. Polish metrics were strongly influenced by Latin, Italian, and French poetry. To this day originally Italian forms (like ottava rima) are written in Poland in 11-syllable lines. Accentual verse was introduced into Polish literature at the end of 18th century but it never replaced traditional syllabic metres. Today 9-syllable lines are extremely popular. They are iambic or choriambic.

== See also ==
- Haiku
- Tanaga - a Tagalog syllabic verse form of four lines of seven syllables
