= Paradise Regained =

Poem by John Milton

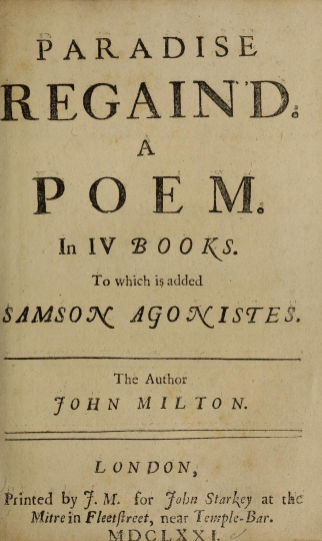
- Cover, c. 1671
- Author: John Milton
- Original title: Paradise Regain'd. A Poem. In IV BOOKS. To which is added SAMSON AGONISTES
- Language: Modern English
- Genre: Epic poem, religious
- Publication date: 1671
- Publication place: Kingdom of England
- Preceded by: Paradise Lost

Paradise Regained is an epic poem by English poet John Milton, first published in 1671. The volume in which it appeared also contained the poet's closet drama Samson Agonistes. Paradise Regained is connected by name to his earlier and more famous epic poem Paradise Lost, with which it shares similar theological themes; indeed, its title, its use of blank verse, and its progression through Christian history recall the earlier work. However, this effort deals primarily with the temptation of Christ as recounted in the Gospel of Luke.

Milton composed Paradise Regained at his cottage in Chalfont St Giles in Buckinghamshire. Paradise Regained is four books long and comprises 2,068 lines; in contrast, Paradise Lost is twelve books long and comprises 10,565 lines. As such, Barbara K. Lewalski has labelled the work a "brief epic".

== Plot ==
=== Book 1 ===
Jesus is baptized by John the Baptist. Satan schemes with the demons against Jesus after witnessing the baptism.

In Heaven, God tells the angels of Satan's arrogance, and He is praised.

Jesus then fasts in the wilderness for 40 days. Satan tempts Jesus with bread but is rebuked. Jesus allows Satan to linger with limitations, staying vigilant. Night falls.

=== Book 2 ===
Simon the Zealot and Andrew the Apostle witness Jesus' baptism, recognizing Him as the Messiah. They lose sight of Him, prompting a frantic search. Jesus' mother, Mother Mary, shares their concern, recalling a time when she lost Jesus at 12 years old.

Satan tells his demons of the challenging temptation ahead, dismissing Belial's honey trapping suggestion due to his belief in pride's strength.

Jesus dreams of Elijah fed by ravens, then resists temptations of Satan: a banquet is offered and rejected; He is tempted with money, and reminds Satan of King David's humble beginnings.

=== Book 3 ===
Satan flatters Christ's wisdom but taunts his lack of achievement compared to Alexander the Great at 30. Jesus rejects violence, seeing suffering as his path. Satan suggests alliances and freeing the Ten Tribes, but Christ chooses divine providence.

=== Book 4 ===
Satan tempts Christ with Ancient Rome, offering all kingdoms in exchange for His allegiance. Christ declines, rebuking Satan by referencing the Book of Exodus.

Satan tries to tempt Christ with Ancient Greek wisdom, but Jesus prefers the Psalms.

Satan then subjects Christ to a perilous night before attempting to lure Him to Jerusalem's temple. Jesus resists, quoting Scripture. Satan fails, and angels aid Christ and return Him to Mary, celebrating His triumph.

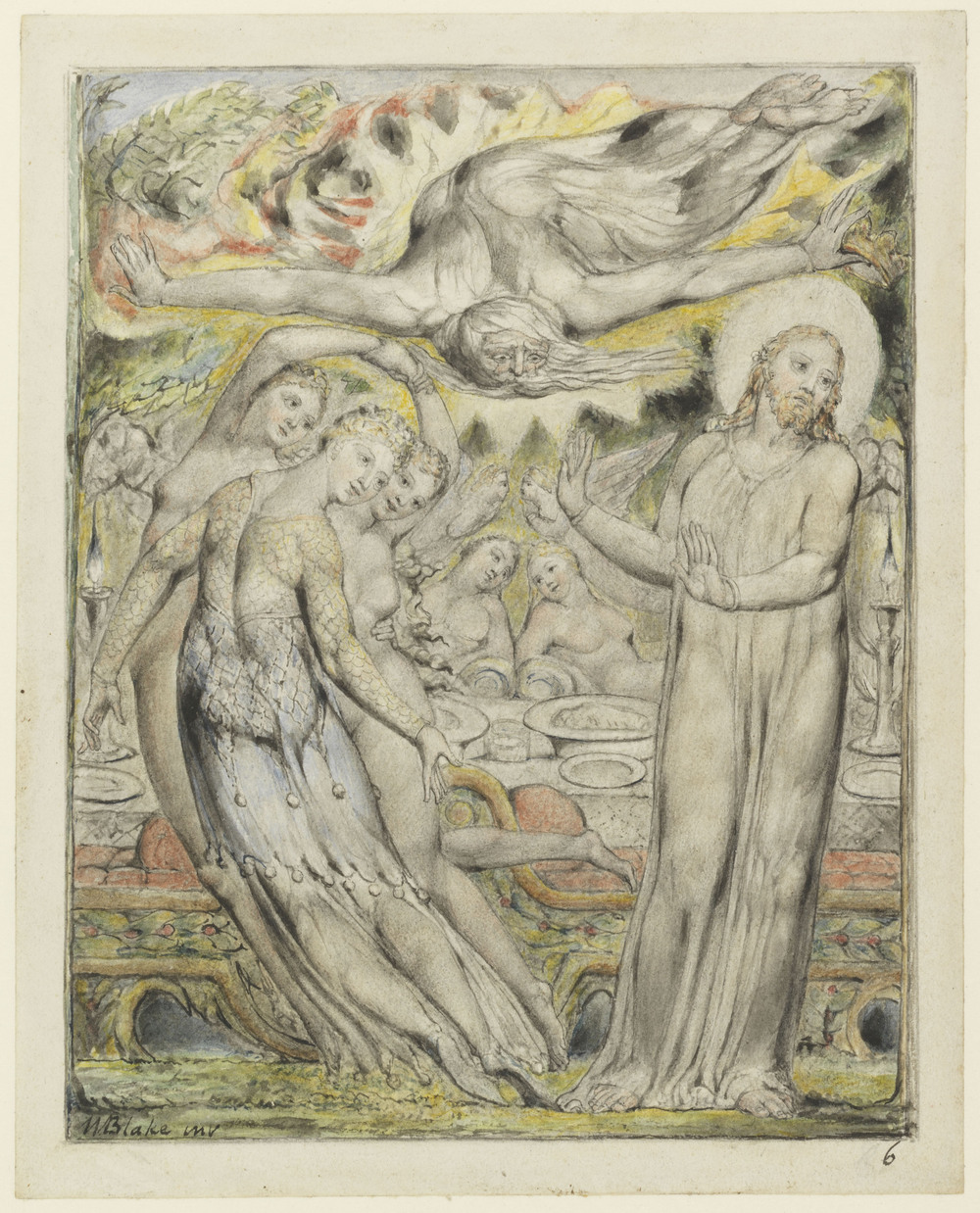
Christ refusing the banquet, William Blake (c. 1816–18)

== Analysis ==
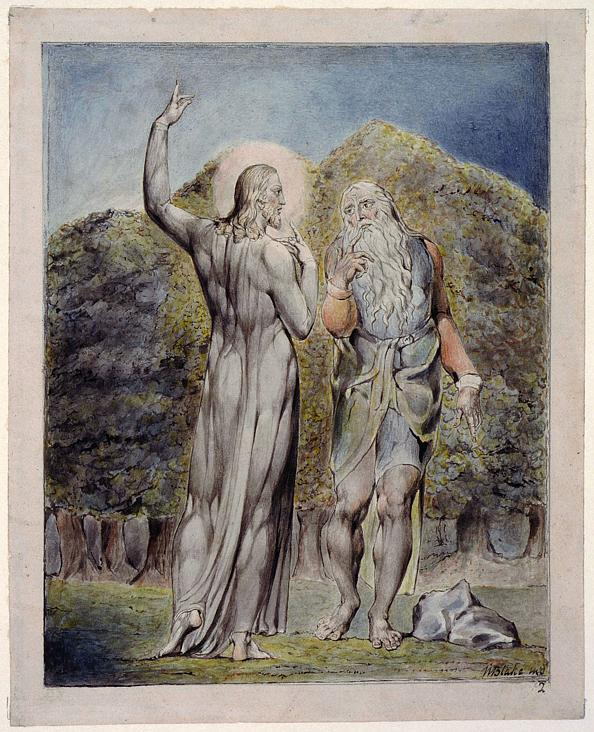
The First Temptation, William Blake (c. 1820)

Whereas Paradise Lost is ornate in style and decorative in its verse, Paradise Regained is carried out in a fairly plain style. Specifically, Milton reduces his use of simile and deploys a simpler syntax in Paradise Regained than he does in Paradise Lost, and this is consistent with Biblical descriptions of Jesus's plainness in his life and teachings (in the epic, he prefers Hebrew Psalms to Greek poetry). Modern editors believe the simpler style of Paradise Regained evinces Milton's poetic maturity. This is not to say that the poem bears no affinities with Milton's earlier work, but scholars continue to agree with Northrop Frye's suggestion that Paradise Regained is "practically sui generis" in its poetic execution.

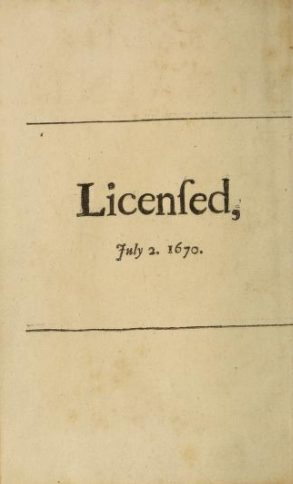
Frontispiece of Paradise Regained, c. 1671

One major concept emphasized throughout Paradise Regained is the idea of reversals. As implied by its title, Milton sets out to reverse the "loss" of Paradise. Thus, antonyms are often found next to each other, reinforcing the idea that everything that was lost in the first epic will be regained by the end of this "brief epic". Additionally, the work focuses on the idea of "hunger", both in a literal and in a spiritual sense. After wandering in the wilderness for forty days, Jesus is starving for food. Satan, too blind to see any non-literal meanings of the term, offers Christ food and various other temptations, but Jesus continually denies him. Although Milton's Jesus is remarkably human, an exclusive focus on this dimension of his character obscures the divine stakes of Jesus's confrontation with Satan; Jesus emerges victorious, and Satan falls, amazed.

An anecdote recounted by a Quaker named Thomas Ellwood provides some insight into Paradise Regained's development. After studying Latin with Milton and reading the poet's epic Paradise Lost, Ellwood remarked, "Thou hast said much here of Paradise lost, but what hast thou to say of Paradise found?" Hearing this, Milton at first "sat some time in a muse" before changing the subject; however, sometime thereafter he showed to Ellwood a new manuscript entitled Paradise Regained. Some maintain that although he seemed to express gratitude to Ellwood in a letter, Milton in truth "passed on a friendly if impish fabrication" that made Ellwood feel like the inspiration for the poem.
