= Robert Bridges =

British poet (1844-1930)

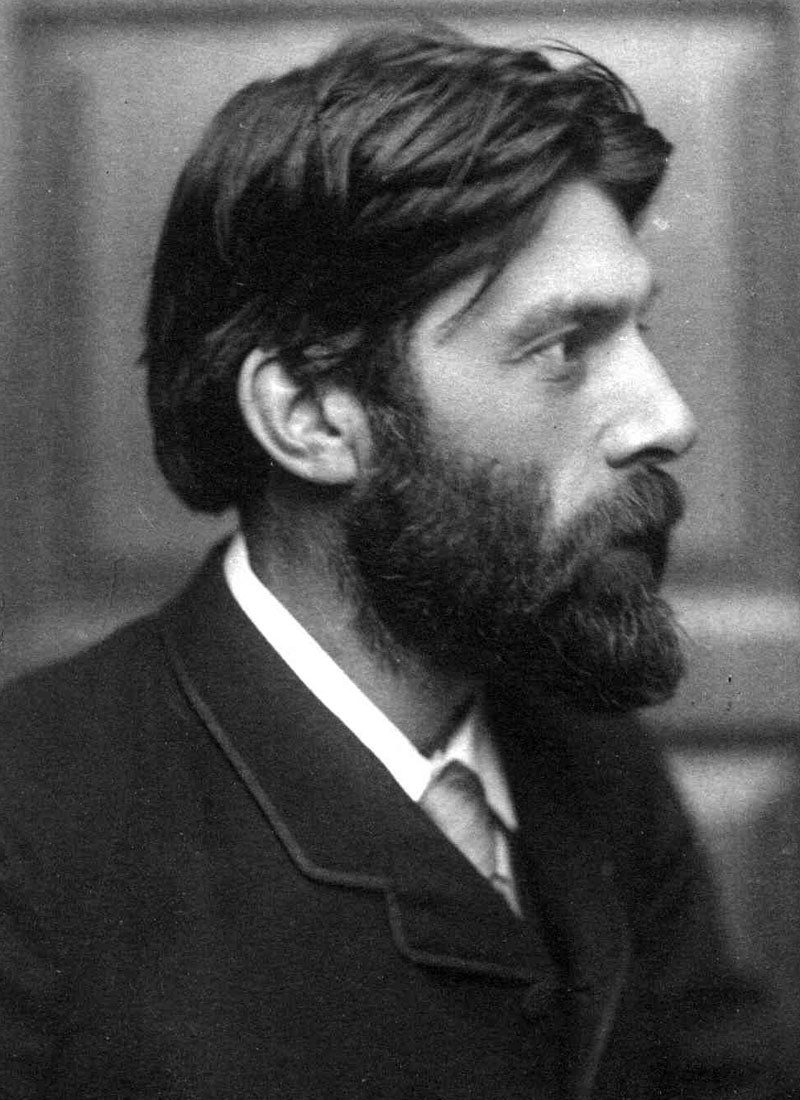

Poet Laureate of the United Kingdom
- In office 25 July 1913 – 21 April 1930
- Monarch: George V
- Preceded by: Alfred Austin
- Succeeded by: John Masefield

Personal details
- Born: Robert Seymour Bridges; 23 October 1844 Walmer, Kent, England, UK
- Died: 21 April 1930 (aged 85) Boars Hill, Berkshire, England
- Spouse: Monica Bridges (born Waterhouse)
- Children: Elizabeth Daryush; Edward Bridges
- Education: Corpus Christi College, Oxford; St Bartholomew's Hospital; Eton College
- Occupation: Writer
- Awards: Poet Laureate

Robert Seymour Bridges (23 October 1844 – 21 April 1930) was an English poet who was Poet Laureate from 1913 to 1930. A doctor by training, he achieved literary fame only late in life. His poems reflect a deep Christian faith, and he is the author of many well-known hymns. It was through Bridges's efforts that the poet Gerard Manley Hopkins achieved posthumous fame.

Bridges was a grandson of Sir Robert Affleck, 4th Baronet, and a stepson of the vicar John Edward Nassau Molesworth. Bridges studied medicine at St Bartholomew's Hospital, and then practised as a casualty physician at his teaching hospital. He served as a full physician to the Great Northern Central Hospital from 1876 until 1885. He retired as a physician in 1885, due to suffering from a lung disease. During the First World War, Bridges was one of the writers serving in Britain's War Propaganda Bureau at Wellington House.

== Personal and professional life ==
Bridges was born at Walmer, Kent, in England, the son of John Thomas Bridges (died 1853) and his wife Harriett Elizabeth, daughter of the Rev. Sir Robert Affleck, 4th Baronet. He was the fourth son and eighth child. After his father's death his mother married again, in 1854, to John Edward Nassau Molesworth, vicar of Rochdale, and the family moved there.

Bridges was educated at Eton College and Corpus Christi College, Oxford. Leaving Oxford in 1867 with a second-class honours degree in Literae humaniores in 1867, he went on to study medicine in London at St Bartholomew's Hospital, intending to practise until the age of forty and then retire to write poetry. He practised as a casualty physician at his teaching hospital (where he made a series of highly critical remarks about the Victorian medical establishment) and subsequently as a full physician to the Great Northern Central Hospital (1876–85)(later the Royal Northern Hospital). He was also a physician to the Hospital for Sick Children.

Lung disease forced Bridges to retire from his post as physician in 1885, and from that point on he devoted himself to writing and literary research. However, Bridges's literary work started long before his retirement, his first collection of poems having been published in 1873. In 1884 he married Mary Monica Waterhouse, daughter of the architect Alfred Waterhouse R.A., and spent the rest of his life in rural seclusion, first at the Manor House Yattendon in Berkshire, then (from 1905) on the Boars Hill ridge above Oxford, where he died.

He was elected to the Fellowship of the Royal College of Physicians of London in 1900. He was appointed Poet Laureate in 1913, the only medical graduate to have held the office.

He was the father of poet Elizabeth Daryush and of the cabinet secretary Edward Bridges.

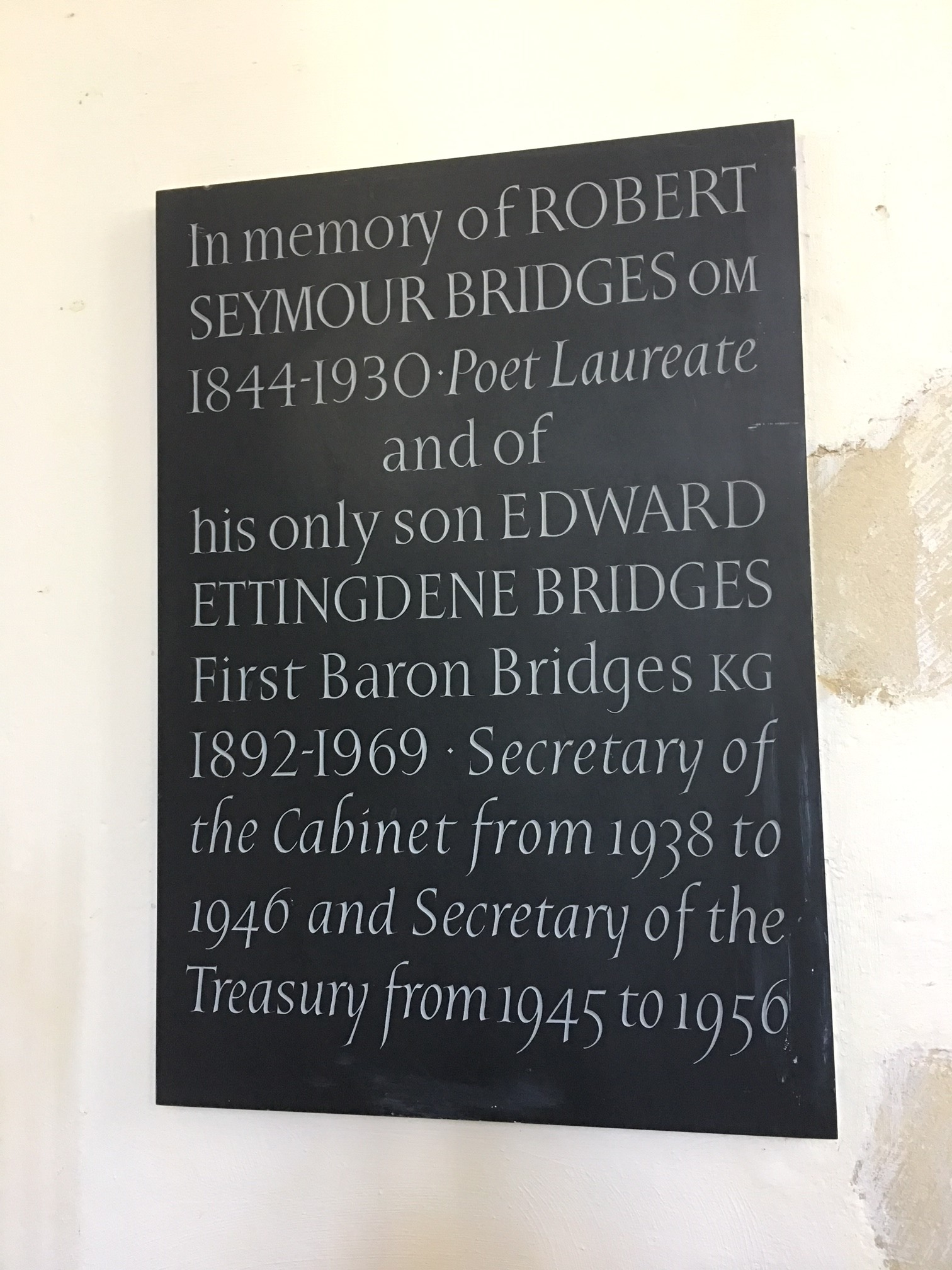
Memorial to Robert Bridges and Edward Bridges, 1st Baron Bridges, in St Nicholas-at-Wade, Kent

== Literary work ==
As a poet Bridges stands rather apart from the current of modern English verse, but his work has had great influence in a select circle, by its restraint, purity, precision and delicacy yet strength of expression. It embodies a distinct theory of prosody. Bridges's faith underpinned much of his work.

In the book Milton's Prosody (1889), he took an empirical approach to examining Milton's use of blank verse, and developed the controversial theory that Milton's practice was essentially syllabic. He considered free verse to be too limiting, and explained his position in the essay "Humdrum and Harum-Scarum". His own efforts to "free" verse resulted in the poems he called "Neo-Miltonic Syllabics", which were collected in New Verse (1925). The metre of these poems was based on syllables rather than accents, and he used the principle again in the long philosophical poem The Testament of Beauty (1929), for which he was appointed to the Order of Merit in that year. His best-known poems, however, are to be found in the two earlier volumes of Shorter Poems (1890, 1894). He also wrote verse plays, with limited success, and literary criticism, including a study of the work of John Keats.

"Melancholia"
The sickness of desire, that in dark days
Looks on the imagination of despair,
Forgetteth man, and stinteth God his praise;
Nor but in sleep findeth a cure for care.
Incertainty that once gave scope to dream
Of laughing enterprise and glory untold,
Is now a blackness that no stars redeem,
A wall of terror in a night of cold.

Fool! thou that hast impossibly desired
And now impatiently despairest, see
How nought is changed: Joy's wisdom is attired
Splendid for others' eyes if not for thee:
Not love or beauty or youth from earth is fled:
If they delite thee not, 'tis thou art dead.

Bridges's poetry was privately printed in the first instance, and was slow in making its way beyond a comparatively small circle of his admirers. His best work is to be found in his Shorter Poems (1890), and a complete edition (to date) of his Poetical Works (6 vols.) was published in 1898–1905.

Despite being made poet laureate in 1913, Bridges was never a very well-known poet and only achieved his great popularity shortly before his death with The Testament of Beauty. However, his verse evoked response in many great British composers of the time. Among those to set his poems to music were Hubert Parry, Gustav Holst and later Gerald Finzi.

During the First World War, Bridges joined the group of writers assembled by Charles Masterman as part of Britain's War Propaganda Bureau at Wellington House.

At Oxford, Bridges befriended Gerard Manley Hopkins, who is now considered a superior poet but who owes his present fame to Bridges's efforts in arranging the posthumous publication (1918) of his verse.

=== Hymnody ===
Bridges made an important contribution to hymnody with the publication in 1899 of his Yattendon Hymnal, which he created specifically for musical reasons. This collection of hymns, although not a financial success, became a bridge between the Victorian hymnody of the last half of the 19th century and the modern hymnody of the early 20th century.

Bridges wrote and also translated historic hymns, and many of these were included in Songs of Syon (1904) and the later English Hymnal (1906). Several of Bridges's hymns and translations are still in use today:

- "Ah, holy Jesu, how hast thou offended" ("Herzliebster Jesu", Johann Heermann, 1630)
- "All my hope on God is founded" (Joachim Neander, c. 1680)
- "Happy are they, they that love God"
- "Jesu, joy of man's desiring" (Martin Jahn, 1661)
- "Love of the Father, Love of God the Son" ("Amor Patris et Filii", 12th century)
- "O gladsome light, O grace" (Phos Hilaron)
- "O sacred head, sore wounded" ("O Haupt voll Blut und Wunden", Paul Gerhardt, 1656)
- "O splendour of God's glory bright" (Ambrose, 4th century)
- "Rejoice, O land, in God thy might"
  - The Baptist Hymn Book, University Press, Oxford 1962
- "The duteous day now closeth" ("Nun ruhen alle Wälder", Paul Gerhardt, 1647)
- "Thee will I love, my God and King"
- "When morning gilds the skies" (stanza 3; Katholisches Gesangbuch, 1744)

== Phonetic alphabet ==
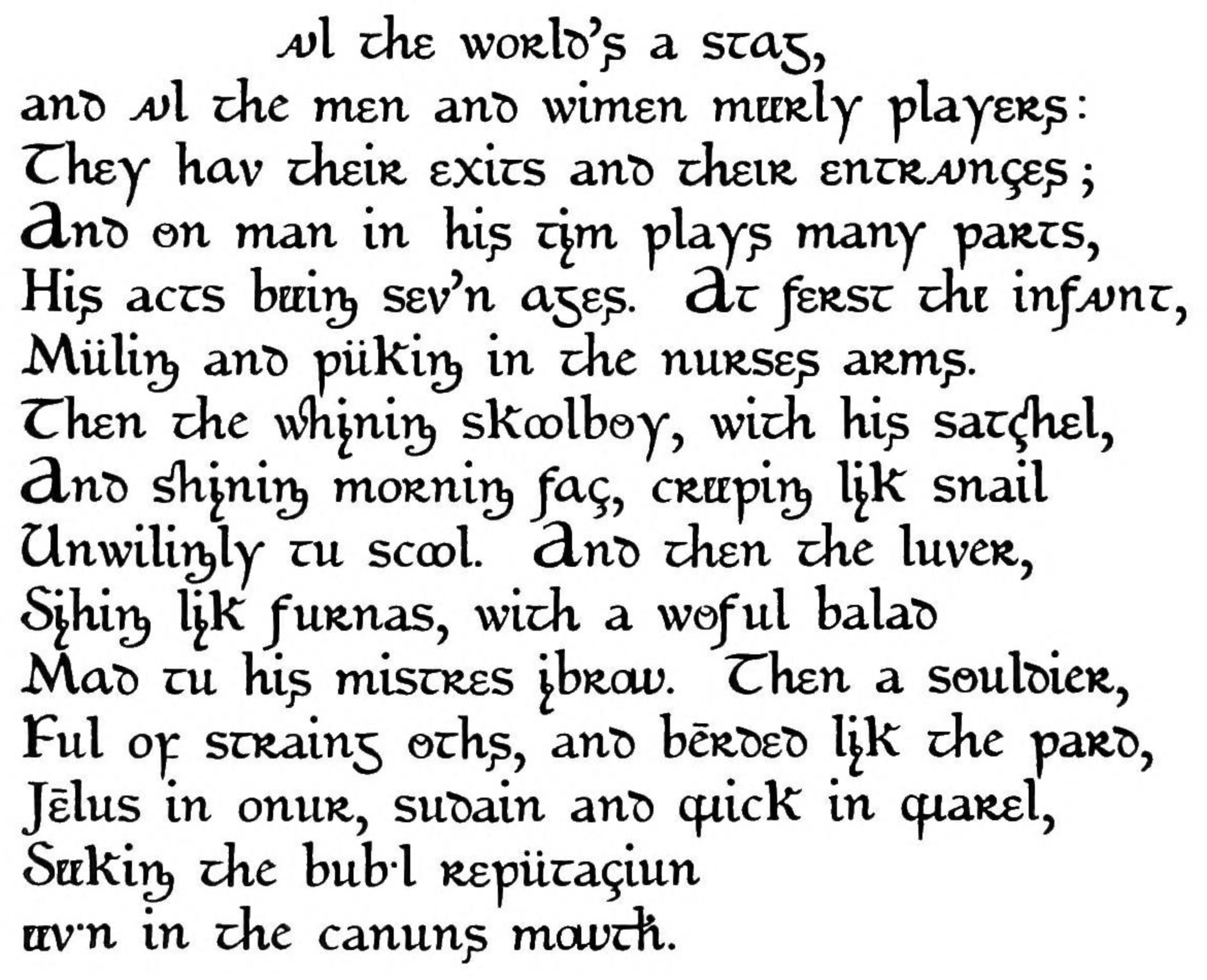
"All the World’s a Stage" set in Bridges's phonetic alphabet.

Robert Bridges developed his own phonetic alphabet for English, with the help of the phonetician David Abercrombie, though the letters were designed by the distinguished typographer Stanley Morison, of the Monotype Corporation. The Oxford University Press printed seven volumes of his Collected Essays, Papers, &tc. in the alphabet. Bridges was also a founding member of the Society for Pure English.

== Major works ==
Dates given are of first publication and significant revisions.

=== Poetry collections ===
- The Growth of Love (1876; 1889; 1898), a sequence of (24; 79; 69) sonnets
- Prometheus the Firegiver: A Mask in the Greek Manner (1883)
- Eros and Psyche: A Narrative Poem in Twelve Measures (1885; 1894), a story from the Latin of Apuleius
- Shorter Poems, Books I–IV (1890)
- Shorter Poems, Books I–V (1894)
- New Poems (1899)
- Demeter: A Mask (1905), performed in 1904 at the opening of the Somerville College Library
- Ibant Obscuri: An Experiment in the Classical Hexameter (1916), with reprint of summary of Stone's Prosody, accompanied by 'later observations & modifications'
- October and Other Poems (1920)
- The Tapestry: Poems (1925), in neo-Miltonic syllabics
- New Verse (1926), includes verse of The Tapestry
- The Testament of Beauty (1929)

=== Verse drama ===
- Nero (1885), an historical tragedy; called The First Part of Nero subsequent to the publication of Nero: Part II
- The Feast of Bacchus (1889); partly translated from the Heauton-Timoroumenos of Terence
- Achilles in Scyros (1890), a drama in a mixed manner
- Palicio (1890), a romantic drama in five acts in the Elizabethan manner
- The Return of Ulysses (1890), a drama in five acts in a mixed manner
- The Christian Captives (1890), a tragedy in five acts in a mixed manner; on the same subject as Calderón's El Principe Constante
- The Humours of the Court (1893), a comedy in three acts; founded on Calderón's El secreto á voces and on Lope de Vega's El Perro del hortelano
- Nero, Part II (1894)

=== Prose ===
- Milton's Prosody, With a Chapter on Accentual Verse (1893; 1901; 1921), based on essays published in 1887 and 1889
- Keats (1895)
- Hymns from the Yattendon Hymnal (1899)
- Poems by the late Rev. Dr. Richard Watson Dixon: a selection with portrait and memoir by Robert Bridges (1909)
- The Poems of Digby Mackworth Dolben: edited with a memoir by Robert Bridges (1911)
- The Spirit of Man (1916)
- Poems of Gerard Manley Hopkins (1918), edited with notes by R.B.
- The Necessity of Poetry (1918)
- Collected Essays, Papers, Etc. (1927–36)
- Three Friends: Memoirs of Digby Mackworth Dolben, Richard Watson Dixon, Henry Bradley (1932)

== See also ==
- Robert Bridges's theory of elision
- Bridges's analysis of Milton's later work

Preceded by Alfred Austin	British Poet Laureate; 1913–1930	Succeeded by John Masefield
