= Iambic tetrameter =

Line consisting of four iambic feet

Iambic tetrameter is a term used in the study of poetic meter, with two different uses.

In the quantitative verse of Ancient Greek and Latin, a line of iambic tetrameter consists of four metra two feet in length, consisting of a spondee and an iamb, or two iambs: | x – u – |. There usually is a caesura in the centre of the line that coincides with the end of the fourth foot, termed diaeresis. Thus the whole line is:

| x – u – | x – u – || x – u – | x – u – |

("x" is a syllable that can be long or short, "–" is a long syllable, and "u" is a short one.)

In the poetry of modern English and other languages using accentual-syllabic verse, "iambic tetrameter" denotes a line consisting of four iambic feet. The scheme is thus:

  x  /  x  /  x  /  x  /  

(In this case, "x" is an unstressed syllable while "/" is a stressed syllable.)

In such traditions, certain poetic forms rely upon the iambic tetrameter, for example triolet, Onegin stanza, In Memoriam stanza, long measure (or long meter) ballad stanza.

== Quantitative verse ==
=== In Medieval Latin ===
The term iambic tetrameter originally applied to the quantitative meter of Classical Greek poetry, in which an iamb consisted of a short syllable followed by a long syllable. Two iambs, or a spondee and an iamb, were joined to make a "metron". In Greek and Latin iambic poetry the first syllable of each iambic metron could optionally be long instead of short.

An example in Latin is the hymn Aeterne rerum conditor composed in the 4th century by St Ambrose, which begins:

Aetérne rḗrum cónditór,
noctém diémque quī́ regís, ...

"Eternal Creator of (all) things,
Who rulest the night and day"

The two lines above consist of the following rhythm, and joined make a tetrameter:

| – – u – | – – u – |
| – – u – | u – u – |

Latin poetry was quantitative, i.e. based on syllable weight not stress accent, and in places the word-stress does not match the metrical beat (ictus, in this article marked with the acute) (e.g. noctém and regís). In Ambrose's hymn, there is a strong break at the end of each half of the tetrameter, so that it is usual to write the two halves of the verse on separate lines.

=== In early Latin ===
The iambic tetrameter was one of the metres used in the comedies of Plautus and Terence in the early period of Latin literature (2nd century BC). This kind of tetrameter is also known as the iambic octonarius, because it has eight iambic feet. There were two varieties. One had a break at the end of the second metron as in Ambrose's hymn. In some lines, however, such as the following from Terence, the break came after the 9th, not the 8th, metrical position:

at tū́ mihi cóntrā núnc vidḗre fórtūnā́tus, Phaédriá!
"But you on the other hand now seem to me to be lucky, Phaedria!"

| – – uu – | – – u – | u – – – | – – u – |

Except at the end of the half-line (positions 7 and 15), a short syllable could be replaced with a long one, as with tūn in fórtūnā́tus, and this long could be resolved into two short ones, as with mihi above.

A variation on this metre was the iambic septenarius, or iambic tetrameter catalectic. This was similar but with the last syllable omitted. The example below also comes from Terence:

sed quíd hŏc est? vídeōn' égo Getám currént(em) hūc ádvenī́re?
But what's this? Do I see Geta running to arrive here?
| – uu – uu | – uu u – || – – – – | u – – |

The final syllable of the line could be long or short, but every final syllable counted as long by the principle known as brevis in longo.

== Accentual-syllabic verse ==
The term iambic tetrameter was adopted to describe a corresponding metre in accentual-syllabic verse, as composed in English, German, Russian, and other languages. Here, iamb refers to an unstressed syllable followed by a stressed syllable, and the original mid-line diaeresis becomes a line break, resulting in a verse that's twice as short. A line of iambic tetrameter consists of four such feet in a row:

da DUM da DUM da DUM da DUM

== Examples ==
=== English ===
 ×    /    ×    / ×    /  ×  /
Come live with me and be my love

(Christopher Marlowe, "The Passionate Shepherd to His Love")

=== German ===
 ×    /   ×  /    × /  ×       /
Dies Bildnis ist bezaubernd schön[4]

(Emanuel Schikaneder, libretto to The Magic Flute)

=== Hebrew ===
× /  × /  ×  /   × /
Adon Olam Asher Malach[5]

(the opening line of Adon Olam, a traditional hymn of anonymous authorship from the Jewish liturgy.)

== See also ==
- Syllable weight
- Iambic pentameter
