= Masculine and feminine endings =

Patterns of syllabic stress

A masculine ending and feminine ending or weak ending are terms used in prosody, the study of verse form. In general, "masculine ending" refers to a line ending in a stressed syllable; "feminine ending" is its opposite, describing a line ending in a stressless syllable. The terms originate from a grammatical pattern of the French language. When masculine or feminine endings are rhymed with the same type of ending, they respectively result in masculine or feminine rhymes. Poems often arrange their lines in patterns of masculine and feminine endings. The distinction of masculine vs. feminine endings is independent of the distinction between metrical feet.

== Description ==
In prosody (the study of verse form), masculine ending refers to a line ending in a stressed syllable while a feminine or weak ending describes a line ending in a stressless syllable.

== Etymology ==
The terms masculine ending and feminine ending are not based on any cultural concept of masculinity or femininity. Rather, they originate from a grammatical pattern of French, in which words of feminine grammatical gender typically ended in a stressless syllable and words of masculine gender ended in a stressed syllable. This pattern held true of French in prior centuries, when (for example) masculine petit 'small' had final stress, but petite, the feminine form, had a stressless schwa ending (which today is not normally pronounced).

== Example ==
Below are the first two stanzas of "A Psalm of Life" by Henry Wadsworth Longfellow. In each stanza, the first and third lines have a feminine ending and the second and fourth lines a masculine one.

Tell me not, in mournful numbers,
Life is but an empty dream!—
For the soul is dead that slumbers,
And things are not what they seem.

Life is real! Life is earnest!
And the grave is not its goal;
Dust thou art, to dust returnest,
Was not spoken of the soul.

The final stressless syllables, creating feminine endings, are -bers, again -bers, -nest, and again -nest. The final stressed syllables, creating masculine endings, are dream, seem, goal, and soul.

== Rhyme ==
=== Masculine rhymes ===
When masculine endings are rhymed (such as "dream" and "seem" in the previous example), the result is called a masculine rhyme (or single rhyme). In English-language poetry, masculine rhymes comprise a majority of all rhymes. John Donne's poem "Lecture Upon the Shadow" is one of many that use exclusively masculine rhyme:

Stand still, and I will read to thee
A lecture, love, in Love's philosophy.
These three hours that we have spent
Walking here, two shadows went
Along with us, which we ourselves produced.
But now the sun is just above our head,
We do those shadows tread,
And to brave clearness all things are reduced.

=== Feminine rhymes ===
When lines with feminine endings are rhymed, the result is termed a feminine rhyme (or double rhyme). Shakespeare's "Sonnet 20" is an extravagant example of feminine rhymes, since (unusually) all fourteen lines end in one.

Text

A woman's face with nature's own hand painted,
Hast thou, the master mistress of my passion;
A woman's gentle heart, but not acquainted
With shifting change, as is false women's fashion
An eye more bright than theirs, less false in rolling,
Gilding the object whereupon it gazeth;
A man in hue, all hues in his controlling,
Which steals men’s eyes and women’s souls amazeth.
And for a woman wert thou first created,
Till nature as she wrought thee fell a-doting,
And by addition me of thee defeated
By adding one thing to my purpose nothing.
But since she prick'd thee out for women's pleasure,
Mine be thy love and thy love's use their treasure.

Rhyming Syllables

pain-ted
pass-ion
quain-ted
fash-ion
roll-ing
gaz-eth
troll-ing
maz-eth
at-ed
dot-ing
feat-ed
noth-ing
plea-sure
trea-sure

Rhyme Pattern

A
B
A
B
C
D
C
D
E
F
E
F
G
G

The following unstressed syllables of a feminine rhyme are often identity rhymes (all syllables the same), but do not have to be; they may be a mosaic rhymes, such as "expand me" and "strand thee".

The feminine rhyme is rare in a monosyllabic language such as English, but the gerund and participle suffix -ing, which adds an additional stressless syllable, can make it readily available. For instance, the -ing ending makes available three of the feminine rhymes in Shakespeare's sonnet above, rolling, trolling, and doting. The Hudibrastic relies upon feminine rhyme for its comedy, and limericks will often employ outlandish feminine rhymes for their humor. Irish satirist Jonathan Swift used many feminine rhymes in his poetry.

Edgar Allan Poe's poem "The Raven" employs multiple feminine rhymes as internal rhymes throughout. An example is the following:

Nothing farther then he uttered—not a feather then he fluttered—
Till I scarcely more than muttered “Other friends have flown before—

Here, uttered and muttered form internal feminine rhymes with fluttered.

== In couplets and stanzas ==
Poems often arrange their lines in patterns of masculine and feminine endings, for instance in "A Psalm of Life", cited above, every couplet consists of a feminine ending followed by a masculine one. This is the pattern followed by the hymns that are classified as "87.87" in standard nomenclature (for this system see Meter (hymn)); an example is John Newton's "Glorious Things of Thee Are Spoken":

Glorious things of thee are spoken,
Zion, city of our God;
He whose word cannot be broken
Formed thee for his own abode;
On the Rock of Ages founded,
What can shake thy sure repose?
With salvation's walls surrounded,
Thou may'st smile at all thy foes.

Here is a German example, from Goethe's verse:

Dämmrung senkte sich von oben,
Schon ist alle Nähe fern;
Doch zuerst emporgehoben
Holden Lichts der Abendstern! (Note: English translation: Twilight sank down from above Already, all near things are far; Yet first is raised high the evening star's fair light.)

== Relation to verse feet ==
The distinction of masculine vs. feminine endings is independent of the distinction between iambic and trochaic feet. For instance, the Longfellow and Newton examples above are written in trochaic tetrameter; the feminine endings occur in the full octosyllabic lines, with perfect final trochaic foot; and the masculine endings occur in the truncated seven-syllable lines, with an exceptional final monosyllabic foot. In contrast, the following poem by Oliver Goldsmith is written in iambic tetrameter; the masculine endings occur in ordinary octosyllabic lines, whereas the feminine endings occur with a ninth, extrametrical syllable:

When lovely woman stoops to folly,
And finds too late that men betray,
What charm can soothe her melancholy,
What art can wash her guilt away?

The only art her guilt to cover,
To hide her shame from every eye,
To give repentance to her lover
And wring his bosom, is—to die.

=== Lines ending in two stressless syllables ===
Particularly in unrhymed verse, lines occur that end in two stressless syllables, yet have the syllable count of lines with uncontroversial masculine endings. For instance, the following four lines from Shakespeare's A Midsummer Night's Dream, written in iambic pentameter:

HELENA:
And even for that do I love you the more.
I am your spaniel; and, Demetrius,
The more you beat me, I will fawn on you.
Use me but as your spaniel, spurn me, strike me,

The first of these, with ten syllables, (Note: "Even" was often a monosyllable for Shakespeare; cf. poetic usages such as "e'er" for "ever", "e'en" for "even(ing)". For discussion, see Coye (2014), p. 22.) has an uncontroversial masculine ending: the stressed syllable more. The last line, with eleven syllables, has an uncontroversial feminine ending: the stressless syllable me. The second and third lines end in two stressless syllables (-tri-us, on you). Having ten syllables, they are structurally parallel to masculine lines, even though they do not end in stressed syllables.

Tarlinskaja (2014) proposes to classify cases like Demetrius or fawn on you as masculine endings (her example is "To sunder his that was thine enemy", from Shakespeare's Romeo and Juliet). Thus for Tarlinskaja, "syllable 10 in masculine endings can be stressed or unstressed".

There remains a further logical possibility: an eleven-syllable line ending in two stressless syllables. In actual verse, such lines are rare at best; Tarlinskaya asserts: "syllable 10 in feminine endings is always stressed."
