= Anisometric verse =

Anisometric verse, known also as heterometric stanza, is a type of poetry where the stanza is made up of lines having unequal metrical length. The number of syllables within the individual lines do not correspond, nor do the number of feet. In poetry, a foot is a group of syllables patterned according to their weight, stress, or accent relative to each other.

Traditionally, poetry uses isometric stanza, each line having the same number of syllables and the same number of feet. Before the 20th century, anisometric verse was rarely seen. Two exceptions are William Wordsworth's Ode: Intimations of Immortality, and Afanasy Fet's Flights Beyond Fancy or Fantasy.

The term anisometry is used often by Professor Emily Klenin in her published analysis of Fet's works: The Poetics of Afanasy Fet.

== Example ==
For example, the following verse would be anisometric:

Though this verse is witty and clever

And writing it took no time

It's all anisometric, using meters much as you would a lever

even if I did make it all rhyme.

== See also ==
- Alliterative verse
- Foot (prosody)
- Literary consonance
