= Tribrach (poetry) =

Metrical foot

Metrical feet and accents
Disyllables
- ◡ ◡: pyrrhic, dibrach
- ◡ –: iamb
  - ◡: trochee, choree
- –: spondee

Trisyllables
- ◡ ◡ ◡: tribrach
  - ◡ ◡: dactyl
- ◡ – ◡: amphibrach
- ◡ ◡ –: anapaest, antidactyl
- ◡ – –: bacchius
  - ◡ –: cretic, amphimacer
  - – ◡: antibacchius
- – –: molossus
- See main article for tetrasyllables.

A tribrach is a metrical foot used in formal poetry and Greek and Latin verse. In quantitative meter (such as the meter of classical verse), it consists of three short syllables occupying a foot, replacing either an iamb (u –) or a trochee (– u). In accentual-syllabic verse (such as formal English verse), the tribrach consists of a run of three short syllables substituted for a trochee.

A "tribrach word" is a word consisting of three short syllables, such as Latin nitida "shining" or Greek ἔχετε "you have". An English equivalent would be a word with three short syllables such as Canada or passenger.

The origin of the word tribrach is the Greek τρίβραχυς, derived from the prefix τρι- "three" and the adjective βραχύς "short".

== Terminology ==
The name tribrachys is first recorded in the Roman writer Quintilian (1st century AD). According to Quintilian, an alternative name for a tribrach was a "trochee": "Three short syllables make a trochaeus, but those who give the name trochaeus to the choraeus prefer to call it a tribrachys.") Quintilian himself referred to it as a trochaeus. However, in modern usage a run of three short syllables is always called a tribrach, while the word trochee is used of a long + short (or heavy + light, or stressed + unstressed) sequence. Another name, mentioned in Diomedes Grammaticus (4th century AD) was tribrevis.

The Latin writer on metrics Terentianus Maurus (2nd century AD) noted that the long syllable of a trochaic foot (– u) was often resolved into two short syllables, "hence what we call a tribrach can also be called a trochaeus". He adds that a tribrach can also be found as a substitute for an iambic foot (u –) and in the first or second half of an amphimacros (i.e. cretic) (– u –).

The earliest mention of the word τρίβραχυς in a Greek writer recorded in Liddell and Scott's lexicon is in the grammarian Hephaestion (2nd century AD), who lists the tribrach among the possible forms which a trochaic foot could take. It was also known as τριβραχὺς ποῦς "a tribrach foot".

== In Latin poetry ==
In Latin poetry a tribrach is never found in the works of Virgil, Ovid, or Catullus, since the hexameter and hendecasyllable metres do not allow a series of more than two short syllables. It is, however, fairly common in iambic and trochaic verse as used in Roman comedy in writers such as Plautus and Terence.

In iambic and trochaic metres a tribrach can replace either an iamb (u –) or a trochee (– u) at any place except immediately before the end of the line or before the central dieresis. Usually the word accent falls at the beginning of the resolved element.

There are certain rules of word division in a tribrach. For example, a tribrach word such as sénibus is not found replacing an iamb (u –) but only replacing a trochee (– u). This rule, however, does not apply in Greek, where word-accent has no effect on the metre.

Occasionally two tribrachs are found together in a verse:

úb(i) era pépererit "when the mistress has given birth"

An example of a double tribrach in more serious verse is found in the poem said to have been written by the emperor Hadrian on his deathbed, Animula vagula blandula. Each line of the poem is in an iambic dimeter (u – u – | u – u –), but in the first and fourth lines the first two long elements are resolved into two short syllables, making a tribrach:

Anímula vágula blándula | u uu u uu | u – u – |
Hospes comesque corporis
Quae nunc abībis in loca?
Pallídula rígida nūdula
Nec ut solēs dabis iocōs

Poor little, wandering, charming soul
Guest and companion of my body,
What place will you go to now?
Pale, stiff, naked little thing,
Nor will you be making jokes as you usually do.

== In English poetry ==
Just as in Latin poetry, a tribrach can replace a trochee in trochaic metre:

Humpty / Dumpty / sat on a / wall

In the music which is traditionally used for this nursery rhyme (see Humpty Dumpty), the words "Humpty" and "Dumpty" are given a quarter note + eighth note, while "sat on a" has three eighth notes.

The substitution of a tribrach for a trochee is often associated with children's poetry. An example in a more serious poem is the following, from Sam Ryder's song "Space Man" (2022). In the refrain a tribrach is used for the words "nothing but" in a similar way with three short equal notes in the music:

I've / searched a/round the / uni/verse
/ Been down / some black / holes
There's / nothing but / space, / man

A double tribrach (as in "higgledy piggledy") is also found in English poetry, for example in the nursery rhyme "Hickory Dickory Dock" (c. 1744):

/ Hickory / dickory / dock.
The / mouse ran / up the / clock.

Another example is found in the children's poem "Disobedience" (1924) by A. A. Milne (from his collection When We Were Very Young):

/ James / James
/ Morrison / Morrison
/ Weatherby / George Du/pree
/ Took / great
/ Care of his / Mother,
/ Though he was / only / three.

In Tamil Poetry'

The Tolkappiyam, an ancient grammatical treatise, examines the linguistic features of the Tamil language through the framework of modern linguistic analysis. It corresponds the Greek 'tribrach' to the prosodic template of themaangaay. Here, the 'short syllable' is calculated not merely by moraic (or quantitative) measurement, but on the basis of specific distributional rules governing graphemic occurrences. In Tamil prosody, syllables (referred to as stresses or quantitative units or short/long syllable) are determined based on the distribution and configuration of phonemes within words. A syllable is classified as heavy or long (possessing structural weight) if it conforms to any of the following four configurations: 1. A sequence of two short vowels. 2. Two short vowels followed by a consonant (otru). 3. A sequence of one short vowel and one long vowel. 4. A combination of one short vowel, one long vowel, and a consonant. These syllable structures are systematically formulated in Tolkappiyam, the earliest extant grammatical treatise of Tamil. Analogously, the Seppaloṭsai metre of Venba poetry—which shares striking structural affinities with the Greek Sapphic stanza—is computed on the basis of these very principles. Conversely, light syllables or short (referred to as unstresses) comprise the following four structural patterns: 1. An isolated short vowel. 2. A short vowel followed by a consonant. 3. An isolated long vowel. 4. A long vowel followed by a consonant." ((Reference: Comparison between the Grammar of Greek Sapphic and Tamil Seppal Songs, D. Pugazhendhi, July 2020, Athens Journal of Philology, 7(3): 147-170; Available at: https://www.athensjournals.gr/philology/2020-7-3-1-Pugazhendhi.pdf)
