= Amphibrach =

Metrical foot

Metrical feet and accents
Disyllables
- ◡ ◡: pyrrhic, dibrach
- ◡ –: iamb
  - ◡: trochee, choree
- –: spondee

Trisyllables
- ◡ ◡ ◡: tribrach
  - ◡ ◡: dactyl
- ◡ – ◡: amphibrach
- ◡ ◡ –: anapaest, antidactyl
- ◡ – –: bacchius
  - ◡ –: cretic, amphimacer
  - – ◡: antibacchius
- – –: molossus
- See main article for tetrasyllables.

An amphibrach (/ˈæmfɪbræk/) is a metrical foot used in Latin and Greek prosody. It consists of a long syllable between two short syllables. The word comes from the Greek ἀμφίβραχυς, amphíbrakhys, "short on both sides".

== Usage ==
=== English ===
In English accentual-syllabic poetry, an amphibrach is a stressed syllable surrounded by two unstressed syllables. It is rarely used as the overall meter of a poem, usually appearing only in a small amount of humorous poetry, children's poetry, and experimental poems. The individual amphibrachic foot often appears as a variant within, for instance, anapaestic meter.

It is the main foot used in the construction of the limerick, as in "There once was / a girl from / Nantucket." It was also used by the Victorians for narrative poetry, e.g. Samuel Woodworth's poem "The Old Oaken Bucket" (1817) beginning "How dear to / my heart are / the scenes of / my childhood." W. H. Auden's poem "O where are you going?" (1931) is a more recent and slightly less metrically regular example. The amphibrach is also often used in ballads and light verse, such as the hypermetrical lines of Sir John Betjeman's poem "Meditation on the A30" (1966).

=== Russian ===
Amphibrachs are a staple meter of Russian poetry. A common variation in an amphibrachic line, in both Russian and English, is to end the line with an iamb, as Thomas Hardy does in "The Ruined Maid" (1901): "Oh did n't / you know I'd / been ru in'd / said she".

=== Polish ===
Amphibrachic metre is very popular in Polish literature. It can be found in romantic poetry in some works by Adam Mickiewicz and Juliusz Słowacki. The best known example is "Deszcz jesienny" (English: "Autumn rain"; 1908) by Leopold Staff. The amphibrach is believed to be suitable for lullabies. Usually Polish amphibrachic lines have feminine endings (for example the tetrametre ◡–◡◡–◡◡–◡◡–◡) but some poets experiment with masculine lines as well. In the poem "Walc" (English: "Waltz") from Czesław Miłosz's 1945 collection Ocalenie the first line is feminine, ◡–◡◡–◡◡–◡◡–◡, the second masculine, ◡–◡◡–◡◡–◡◡–, and so on. Jan Bolesław Ożóg experimented with irregular amphibrachic verse with different numbers of feet in successive lines. An example of this way of making verse is the poem Jemioła (Mistletoe), included in the book with the same title (1966).

== Examples ==
=== Dr. Seuss ===
Some books by Dr. Seuss contain many lines written in amphibrachs, such as these from If I Ran the Circus (1956):

All ready / to put up / the tents for / my circus.
I think I / will call it / the Circus / McGurkus.

And NOW comes / an act of / Enormous / Enormance!
No former / performer's / performed this / performance!

=== A Visit from St. Nicholas ===
Clement Clarke Moore's popular Christmas poem "A Visit from St. Nicholas" is written mostly in anapestic tetrameter ("'Twas the Night before Christmas, when all through the house…") but shifts into amphibrachs when St. Nick calls his reindeer by name:

Now, Dasher! / now, Dancer! / now, Prancer / and Vixen!
On, Comet! / on, Cupid! / on, Donder / and Blitzen!

=== Famous Blue Raincoat ===
Much of Leonard Cohen's song "Famous Blue Raincoat" (1971) is written in amphibrachs, e.g. the first verse (the first foot of the third line has only two syllables and begins in the second syllable):

It's four in / the morning, / the end of / December
I'm writing / you now just / to see if / you're better
___ New York / is cold, but / I like where / I'm living
There's music / on Clinton / Street all through / the evening.
