= Light ending =

Light ending may refer to:

- Feminine ending, in grammatical gender, the final syllable or suffixed letters that mark words as feminine
- Masculine and feminine endings, in poetic meter, a line of verse that ends with an unstressed (feminine) syllable
