= Cretic =

Metrical foot

Metrical feet and accents
Disyllables
- ◡ ◡: pyrrhic, dibrach
- ◡ –: iamb
  - ◡: trochee, choree
- –: spondee

Trisyllables
- ◡ ◡ ◡: tribrach
  - ◡ ◡: dactyl
- ◡ – ◡: amphibrach
- ◡ ◡ –: anapaest, antidactylus
- ◡ – –: bacchius
  - ◡ –: cretic, amphimacer
  - – ◡: antibacchius
- – –: molossus
- See main article for tetrasyllables.

A cretic (/ˈkriːtɪk/ KREE-tik), also known as an amphimacer (/æmˈfɪməsər/ am-FIM-ə-sər) and sometimes paeon diagyios, is a metrical foot containing three syllables: long, short, long (– ᴗ –). In Greek poetry, lines made entirely of cretic feet are less common than other metres. An example is Alcman 58. However, any line mixing iambs and trochees could employ a cretic foot as a transition. In other words, a poetic line might have two iambs and two trochees, with a cretic foot in between.

In later poets the cretic foot could be resolved into a paeonic (ᴗ ᴗ ᴗ – or – ᴗ ᴗ ᴗ) or sometimes even five short syllables (ᴗ ᴗ ᴗ ᴗ ᴗ).

In Latin, cretics were used for composition both in comedy and tragedy. They are fairly frequent in Plautus but rarer in Terence. (See Metres of Roman comedy.)

Words which include a cretic (e.g. Latin cīvitās and its various inflections) cannot be used in works composed in dactylic hexameter or dactylic pentameter.

For Romance language poetry, the cretic has been a common form in folk poetry, whether in proverbs or tags. Additionally, some English poets have responded to the naturally iambic nature of English and the need for a trochaic initial substitution to employ a cretic foot. That is, it is commonplace for English poetry to employ a trochee in the first position of an otherwise iambic line, and some poets have consciously worked with cretic lines and fully cretic measures. English Renaissance songs employed cretic dimeter fairly frequently (e.g. "Shall I die? Shall I fly?" attributed to William Shakespeare). Because the cretic, in stress-based prosody, is natural for a comparison or antithesis, it is well suited to advertising slogans and adages.
