= Dactyl (poetry) =

Metrical foot

Metrical feet and accents
Disyllables
- ◡ ◡: pyrrhic, dibrach
- ◡ –: iamb
  - ◡: trochee, choree
- –: spondee

Trisyllables
- ◡ ◡ ◡: tribrach
  - ◡ ◡: dactyl
- ◡ – ◡: amphibrach
- ◡ ◡ –: anapaest, antidactyl
- ◡ – –: bacchius
  - ◡ –: cretic, amphimacer
  - – ◡: antibacchius
- – –: molossus
- See main article for tetrasyllables.

A dactyl is like a finger, having one long part followed by two short stretches.

A dactyl (/ˈdæktɪl/; from Greek δάκτυλος 'finger') is a foot in poetic meter. In quantitative verse, often used in Greek or Latin, a dactyl is a long syllable followed by two short syllables, as determined by syllable weight. The best-known use of dactylic verse is in the epics attributed to the Greek poet Homer, the Iliad and the Odyssey. In accentual verse, often used in English, a dactyl is a stressed syllable followed by two unstressed syllables—the opposite is the anapaest (two unstressed followed by a stressed syllable).

An example of dactylic meter is the first line of Henry Wadsworth Longfellow's epic poem Evangeline (1847), which is in dactylic hexameter:

This is the / forest prim- / eval. The / murmuring / pines and the / hemlocks,

The first five feet of the line are dactyls; the sixth a trochee.

Stephen Fry quotes Robert Browning's poem "The Lost Leader" as an example of the use of dactylic metre to great effect, creating verse with "great rhythmic dash and drive":

Just for a handful of silver he left us
Just for a riband to stick in his coat

The first three feet in both lines are dactyls.

Another example is the opening lines of Walt Whitman's poem "Out of the Cradle Endlessly Rocking" (1859), a poem about the birth of the author's poetic voice:

Out of the cradle, endlessly rocking [a dactyl, followed by a trochee ('cradle'); then another dactyl followed by a trochee ('rocking')]
Out of the mockingbird's throat, the musical shuttle [2 dactyls, then a trochee ('throat, the'); then another dactyl, followed by a trochee]
. . .

The dactyl "out of the..." becomes a pulse that rides through the entire poem, often generating the beginning of each new line, even though the poem as a whole, as is typical for Whitman, is extremely varied and "free" in its use of metrical feet.

Dactyls are the metrical foot of Greek and Latin elegiac poetry, which followed a line of dactylic hexameter with dactylic pentameter.

In the opening chapter of James Joyce's novel Ulysses (1922), a character quips that his name is "absurd": "Malachi Mulligan, two dactyls" (Mal-i-chi Mull-i-gan).

== Dactyls in contemporary poetry ==
The anthology Measure for Measure: An Anthology of Poetic Meters collects a number of contemporary as well as classic poems in dactylic meter. Recent dactylic poems in the meter online include "Moon for Our Daughters" and "Love in the Morning" by Annie Finch, and "Song of the Powers" by David Mason

A contemporary use in popular music is "Hollywood Nights" by Bob Seger, which alternates between dactylic pentameter (albeit with an extra syllable, or hypercatalexis), followed by a line in dactylic tetrameter:

Night after night, day after day, it went on and on
Then came that morning, he woke up alone
He spent all night staring down at the lights of L.A.
Wondering if he could ever go home

== See also ==
- Double dactyl

== Sources ==
- Youmans, G. (2014). Rhythm and Meter: Phonetics and Phonology, Vol. 1. United Kingdom: Elsevier Science.
- Fraser, N. M. (1930). A Study of Meter in Goethe's Faust. (n.p.): University of Wisconsin—Madison.
- Finch, A. (1993). The ghost of meter: culture and prosody in American free verse. Ann Arbor: University of Michigan Press.
- Finch, A., and A. Oliver.
