= Iamb (poetry) =

Metrical foot

Metrical feet and accents
Disyllables
- ◡ ◡: pyrrhic, dibrach
- ◡ –: iamb
  - ◡: trochee, choree
- –: spondee

Trisyllables
- ◡ ◡ ◡: tribrach
  - ◡ ◡: dactyl
- ◡ – ◡: amphibrach
- ◡ ◡ –: anapaest, antidactylus
- ◡ – –: bacchius
  - ◡ –: cretic, amphimacer
  - – ◡: antibacchius
- – –: molossus
- See main article for tetrasyllables.

An iamb (/ˈaɪæm/ EYE-am) or iambus is a metrical foot used in various types of poetry. Originally the term referred to one of the feet of the quantitative meter of classical Greek prosody: a short syllable followed by a long syllable (as in καλή (kalḗ) "beautiful (f.)"). This terminology was adopted in the description of accentual-syllabic verse in English, where it refers to a foot comprising an unstressed syllable followed by a stressed syllable (as in abóve). Thus a Latin word like íbī, because of its short-long rhythm, is considered by Latin scholars to be an iamb, but because it has a stress on the first syllable, in modern linguistics it is considered to be a trochee.

== Etymology ==
R. S. P. Beekes has suggested that the Ancient Greek: ἴαμβος iambos has a Pre-Greek origin. An old hypothesis is that the word is borrowed from Phrygian or Pelasgian, and literally means "Einschritt", i. e., "one-step", compare dithyramb and thriambus, but H. S. Versnel rejects this etymology and suggests instead a derivation from a cultic exclamation. The word may be related to Iambe, a Greek minor goddess of verse, especially scurrilous, ribald humour. In ancient Greece iambus was mainly satirical poetry, lampoons, which did not automatically imply a particular metrical type. Iambic metre took its name from being characteristic of iambi, not vice versa.

== Accentual-syllabic use ==
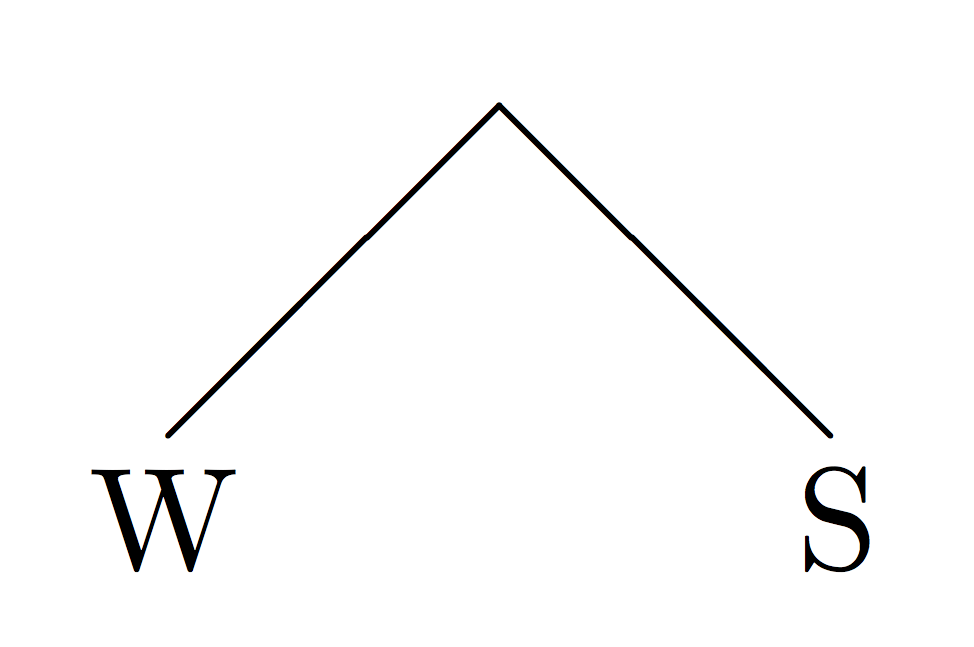
A metrical tree representation of an iamb. W = weak syllable, S = strong syllable

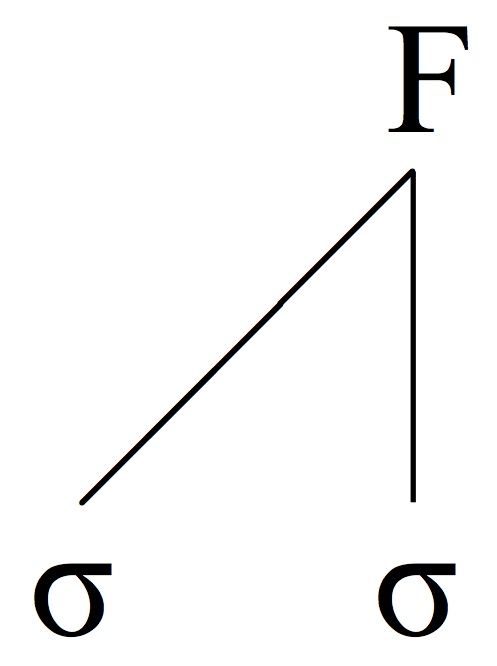
An alternative metrical tree representation of an iamb. F = foot, σ = syllable. The head of the foot constituent, i.e. the stressed syllable, is indicated with a vertical line.

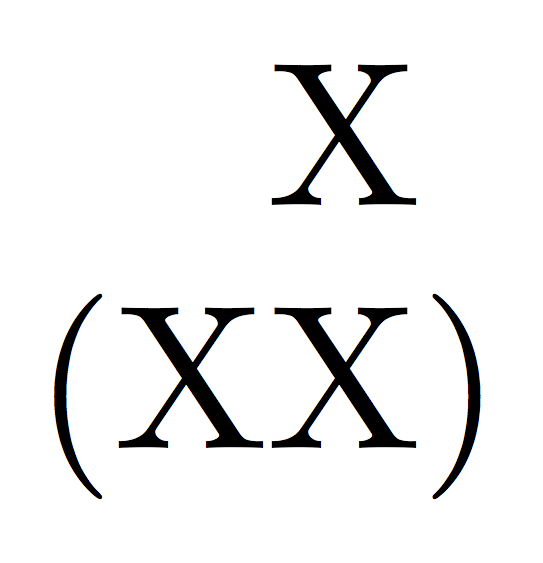
A bracketed grid representation of an iamb. The x's in the lower grid are syllables, the x in the upper grid indicates the position of the stressed syllable.

In accentual-syllabic verse and in modern linguistics an iamb is a foot that has the rhythmic pattern:

| da | DUM |

Using the 'ictus and x' notation (see systems of scansion for a full discussion of various notations) we can write this as:

| x | / |

The word 'attempt' is a natural iamb:

| x | / |
| at- | tempt |

In phonology, an iambic foot is notated in a flat representation as (σ'σ) or as foot tree with two branches W and S where W = weak and S = strong.

Iambic pentameter is one of the most commonly used measures in English and German poetry; for instance, it can be found in Shakespeare's Sonnets. A line of iambic pentameter comprises five consecutive iambs.

Iambic trimeter is the metre of the spoken verses in Greek tragedy and comedy, comprising six iambs—as one iambic metrum consisted of two iambs. In English accentual-syllabic verse, iambic trimeter is a line comprising three iambs.

Less common iambic measures include iambic tetrameter (four iambs per line) and iambic heptameter, sometimes called the "fourteener" (seven iambs per line). Lord Byron's also "She Walks in Beauty" exemplifies iambic tetrameter; iambic heptameter is found in Australian poet A. B. "Banjo" Paterson's "The Man from Ironbark". Related to iambic heptameter is the more common ballad verse (also called common metre), in which a line of iambic tetrameter is succeeded by a line of iambic trimeter, usually in quatrain form. Samuel Taylor Coleridge's The Rime of the Ancient Mariner is a classic example of this form.

The reverse of an iamb is called a trochee.

== Types of meter ==
Key:

- Non-bold = unstressed syllable
- **Bold** = stressed syllable

=== Dimeter ===
Iambic dimeter is a meter referring to a line consisting of two iambic feet.

The way a crow

Shook down on me.... (Robert Frost, "Dust of Snow")

=== Trimeter ===
Iambic trimeter is a meter referring to a line consisting of three iambic feet.

We romped until the pans

Slid from the kitchen shelf; (Theodore Roethke, "My Papa's Waltz")

The only news I know

Is bulletins all day (Emily Dickinson, "The Only News I Know")

=== Tetrameter ===
Iambic tetrameter is a meter referring to a line consisting of four iambic feet:

She walks in beauty, like the night

Of cloudless climes and starry skies; (Lord Byron, "She Walks in Beauty")

=== Pentameter ===
Iambic pentameter is a meter referring to a line consisting of five iambic feet:

To strive, to seek, to find, and not to yield. (Alfred Tennyson, "Ulysses")

Shall I compare thee to a summer's day? (William Shakespeare, Sonnet 18)

(Although, it could be argued that this line in fact reads: Shall I compare thee to a summer's day? Meter is often broken in this way, sometimes for intended effect and sometimes simply due to the sound of the words in the line. Where the stresses lie can be debated, as it depends greatly on where the reader decides to place the stresses. Although in this meter the foot is no longer iambs but trochees.)

A horse! A horse! My kingdom for a horse! (William Shakespeare, Richard III)

They also serve who only stand and wait. (John Milton, When I Consider How My Light is Spent)

=== Hexameter ===
Iambic hexameter is a meter referring to a line consisting of six iambic feet. In English verse, "alexandrine" is typically used to mean "iambic hexameter"

Ye sacred Bards, that to ¦ your harps' melodious strings

Sung th'ancient Heroes' deeds (the monuments of Kings) (Michael Drayton, Poly-Olbion)

=== Heptameter ===
Iambic heptameter is a meter referring to a line consisting of seven iambic feet:

I s'pose the flats is pretty green up there in Ironbark. (A. B. Paterson, The Man from Ironbark)

== Sound change ==
Through iambic shortening, a word with the shape light–heavy or short–long changes to become light–light; for example, ibī changes to ibi with two short syllables. In modern linguistics this change is sometimes referred to as "trochaic shortening", since íbī has a stress on the first syllable and is thus in modern linguistic terms a trochee.

== See also ==
- Common metre
- Long metre
- Prosody (Latin)
- Short metre
