= Caesura =

Pause or break in poetry or music

An example of a caesura in modern western music notation

A caesura (/sɪˈzjʊərə/, pl. caesuras or caesurae; Latin for "cutting"), also written cæsura and cesura, is a metrical pause or break in a verse where one phrase ends and another phrase begins. It may be expressed by a comma (,), a tick (✓), or two lines, either slashed (//) or upright (||). In time value, this break may vary between the slightest perception of silence all the way up to a full pause.

== Poetry ==
In classical Greek and Latin poetry, a caesura is the juncture where one word ends and the following word begins within a foot. In contrast, a word juncture at the end of a foot is called a diaeresis. Some caesurae are expected and represent a point of articulation between two phrases or clauses. All other caesurae are only potentially places of articulation. The opposite of an obligatory caesura is a bridge where word juncture is not permitted.

In modern European poetry, a caesura is defined as a natural phrase end, especially when occurring in the middle of a line. A masculine caesura follows a stressed syllable, while a feminine caesura follows an unstressed syllable. A caesura is also described by its position in a line of poetry; a caesura close to the beginning of a line is called an initial caesura, one in the middle of a line is medial, and one near the end of a line is terminal. Initial and terminal caesurae are rare in formal, Romance, and Neoclassical verse, which prefer medial caesurae.

=== Mark ===
In verse scansion, the modern caesura mark is a double vertical bar ⟨||⟩ or ⟨$\|$⟩, a variant of the single-bar virgula ("twig") used as a caesura mark in medieval manuscripts. The same mark separately developed as the virgule, the single slash used to mark line breaks in poetry.

=== Examples ===
==== Homer ====
Caesurae were widely used in Greek poetry. For example, in the opening line of the Iliad:

μῆνιν ἄειδε, θεὰ, || Πηληϊάδεω Ἀχιλῆος
mênin áeide, theà, || Pēlēïádeō Akhilêos
("Sing the rage, o goddess, || of Achilles, the son of Peleus.")

This line includes a masculine caesura after θεὰ, a natural break that separates the line into two logical parts. Homeric lines more commonly employ feminine caesurae; this preference is observed to an even higher degree among the Alexandrian poets. An example of a feminine caesura is the opening line of the Odyssey:

ἄνδρα μοι ἔννεπε, Μοῦσα, || πολύτροπον, ὃς μάλα πολλὰ
ándra moi énnepe, Moûsa, || polútropon, hòs mála pollà
("Tell me, Muse, of the man || of many wiles, who very much (wandered)")

Occasionally (about one line in 100) the caesura comes in the fourth foot only.

==== Latin ====
Caesurae were widely used in Latin poetry, for example, in the opening line of Virgil's Aeneid:

Arma virumque cano || Troiae qui primus ab oris
(Of arms and the man, I sing. || Who first from the shores of Troy...)

This line uses caesura in the medial position. In dactylic hexameter, a caesura occurs any time the ending of a word does not coincide with the beginning or the end of a metrical foot; in modern prosody, however, it is only called one when the ending also coincides with an audible pause in the line.

The ancient elegiac couplet form of the Greeks and Romans contained a line of dactylic hexameter followed by a line of pentameter. The pentameter often displayed a clearer caesura, as in this example from Propertius:

Cynthia prima fuit; || Cynthia finis erit.
(Cynthia was the first; Cynthia will be the last)

==== Old English ====
In Old English, the caesura has come to represent a pronounced pause to emphasize lines in Old English poetry that would otherwise be considered to be a droning, monotonous line. This makes the caesura arguably more important to the Old English verse than it was to Latin or Greek poetry. In Latin or Greek poetry, the caesura could be suppressed for effect in any line. In the alliterative verse that is shared by most of the oldest Germanic languages, the caesura is an ever-present and necessary part of the verse form itself. The opening line of Beowulf reads:

Hwæt! We Gardena || in gear-dagum,
þeodcyninga, || þrym gefrunon,
hu ða æþelingas || ellen fremedon.

(Behold! The Spear-Danes in days gone by,)
(and the kings who ruled them had courage and greatness,)
(We have heard of these princes' heroic campaigns.)

The basic form is accentual verse, with four stresses per line separated by a caesura. Old English poetry added alliteration and other devices to this basic pattern.

==== Middle English ====
William Langland's Piers Ploughman:

I loked on my left half || as þe lady me taughte
And was war of a woman || worþeli ycloþed.

(I looked on my left half / as the lady me taught)
(and was aware of a woman / worthily clothed.)

==== South and Southeast Asia ====
In the Brahmic scripts of South and Southeast Asia (e.g. Devanagari), a punctuation mark called the danda is used to mark subdivisions in text, with single and double variants variously marking phrases, sentences, semiverses, verses, or larger sections.

An example of the use of danda as caesurae in Indian poetry is in the "dohas" or couplet poems of Sant Kabir Das, a 15th-century poet who was central to the Bhakti movement in Hinduism. Kabir employs the danda to mark semi-verse and verse, as in the following couplet:

कस्तूरी कुंडल बसे मृग ढूँढत बन माहि ।
ज्यों घट घट में राम हैं दुनिया देखत नाहि ॥
Kastūrī kuṃḍala base, mṛga ḍhūm̐ḍhata bana māhi ।
Jyo ghaṭa ghaṭa rāma hai, duniyā dekhe nāhī ॥
(Musk lies in the musk deer's own nave ।)
(But roam in the forest he does – it to seek ॥)

==== Polish ====
Caesura is very important in Polish syllabic verse (as in French alexandrine). Every line longer than eight syllables is divided into two half-lines. Lines composed of the same number of syllables with division in different place are considered to be completely different metrical patterns. For example, Polish alexandrine (13) is almost always divided 7+6. It has been very common in Polish poetry for last five centuries, but the metre 13(8+5) occurs only rarely and 13(6+7) can be hardly found. In Polish accentual-syllabic verse, caesura is not so important, but iambic tetrametre (very popular today) is usually 9(5+4). Caesura in Polish syllabic verse is almost always feminine, while in accentual-syllabic (especially iambic) verse, it is often masculine: sSsSsSsS//sSsSsSsSs. Also, metrical patterns occur with two or three caesurae, for example 18[9(5+4)+9(5+4)].

==== Other examples ====
Caesurae can occur in later forms of verse, where they are usually optional. The so-called ballad meter, or the common meter of the hymnodists (see also hymn), is usually thought of as a line of iambic tetrameter followed by a line of trimeter, but it can also be considered a line of heptameter with a fixed caesura at the fourth foot.

Considering the break as a caesura in these verse forms, rather than a beginning of a new line, explains how sometimes multiple caesurae can be found in this verse form (from the ballad, Tom o' Bedlam):

From the hag and hungry goblin || that into rags would rend ye,
And the spirits that stand || by the naked man || in the Book of Moons, defend ye!

In later and freer verse forms, the caesura is optional. It can, however, be used for rhetorical effect, as in Alexander Pope's line:

To err is human; || to forgive, divine.

== Music ==
In music, a caesura denotes a brief, silent pause, during which metrical time is not counted. Similar to a silent fermata, caesurae are located between notes or measures (before or over bar lines), rather than on notes or rests (as with a fermata). A fermata may be placed over a caesura to indicate a longer pause.

In musical notation, a caesura is marked by double oblique lines, similar to a pair of slashes ⟨//⟩. The symbol is popularly called "tram-lines" in the UK and "railroad tracks" or "train tracks" in the US. The symbol is encoded in Unicode as U+1D113 𝄓 MUSICAL SYMBOL CAESURA.

The length of a caesura where notated is at the discretion of the musician.

== See also ==
- Anacrusis
- Danda
- Ellipsis
- Kireji
- Line break
- Meter (poetry)
- Old English poetry
- Prosody (Latin)
- Regulated verse
- Saturnian (poetry)
- Tacet
