= Anapaest =

Metrical foot

Metrical feet and accents
Disyllables
- ◡ ◡: pyrrhic, dibrach
- ◡ –: iamb
  - ◡: trochee, choree
- –: spondee

Trisyllables
- ◡ ◡ ◡: tribrach
  - ◡ ◡: dactyl
- ◡ – ◡: amphibrach
- ◡ ◡ –: anapaest, antidactylus
- ◡ – –: bacchius
  - ◡ –: cretic, amphimacer
  - – ◡: antibacchius
- – –: molossus
- See main article for tetrasyllables.

An anapaest (/ˈænəpiːst, -pɛst/; also spelled anapæst or anapest, and also called antidactyl or antidactylus) is a metrical foot used in formal poetry. In classical quantitative meters it consists of two short syllables followed by a long one; in accentual stress meters it consists of two unstressed syllables followed by one stressed syllable. It may be seen as a reversed dactyl. This word comes from the Greek ἀνάπαιστος, anápaistos, literally "struck back" and in a poetic context "a dactyl reversed".

Because of its length and the fact that it ends with a stressed syllable and so allows for strong rhymes, anapaest can produce a very rolling verse, and allows for long lines with a great deal of internal complexity.

Apart from their independent role, anapaests are sometimes used as substitutions in iambic verse. In strict iambic pentameter, anapaests are rare, but they are found with some frequency in freer versions of the iambic line, such as the verse of Shakespeare's last plays, or the lyric poetry of the 19th century.

== Examples ==
=== Trimeter ===
Here is an example from William Cowper's "Verses Supposed to be Written by Alexander Selkirk" (1782), composed in anapaestic trimeter:

I must finish my journey alone

=== Tetrameter ===
An example of anapaestic tetrameter is the "A Visit from St. Nicholas" by Clement Clarke Moore (1823):

Twas the night before Christmas and all through the house

The following is from Byron's "The Destruction of Sennacherib":

The Assyrian came down like a wolf on the fold
And his cohorts were gleaming in purple and gold
And the sheen of their spears was like stars on the sea
When the blue wave rolls nightly on deep Galilee.

=== Hexameter ===
An even more complex example comes from Yeats's The Wanderings of Oisin (1889). He intersperses anapests and iambs, using six-foot lines (rather than four feet as above). Since the anapaest is already a long foot, this makes for very long lines.

Fled foam underneath us and 'round us, a wandering and milky smoke
As high as the saddle-girth, covering away from our glances the tide
And those that fled and that followed from the foam-pale distance broke.
The immortal desire of immortals we saw in their faces and sighed.

The mixture of anapaests and iambs in this manner is most characteristic of late-19th-century verse, particularly that of Algernon Charles Swinburne in poems such as The Triumph of Time (1866) and the choruses from Atalanta in Calydon (1865). Swinburne also wrote several poems in more or less straight anapaests, with line-lengths varying from three feet ("Dolores") to eight feet ("March: An Ode").

=== Heptameter ===
Neutral Milk Hotel's song "In the Aeroplane Over the Sea" can be described as mainly being written in anapaestic heptameter, or two dimetric lines followed by a trimetric one. At the end of the verses there is a cretic monometer and a line that is a variation of an iambic pentameter.

What a beautiful face
I have found in this place
That is circling all 'round the sun
What a beautiful dream
That could flash on the screen
In a blink of an eye and be gone from me
Soft and sweet
Let me hold it close and keep it here with me

=== Comic poetry ===
The anapaest's most common role in English verse is as a comic metre: the foot of the limerick, of Lewis Carroll's poem The Hunting of the Snark (1876), Edward Lear's The Book of Nonsense (1846), Old Possum's Book of Practical Cats (1939) by T. S. Eliot, a number of Dr. Seuss books, among other examples.

== See also ==
- Anapestic tetrameter
- Scansion
