= Accent (poetry) =

Stressed syllable

Metrical feet and accents
Disyllables
- ◡ ◡: pyrrhic, dibrach
- ◡ –: iamb
  - ◡: trochee, choree
- –: spondee

Trisyllables
- ◡ ◡ ◡: tribrach
  - ◡ ◡: dactyl
- ◡ – ◡: amphibrach
- ◡ ◡ –: anapaest, antidactylus
- ◡ – –: bacchius
  - ◡ –: cretic, amphimacer
  - – ◡: antibacchius
- – –: molossus
- See main article for tetrasyllables.

In English poetry, accent refers to the stressed syllable of a polysyllabic word, or a monosyllabic word that receives stress because it belongs to an "open class" of words (noun, verb, adjective, adverb) or because of "contrastive" or "rhetorical" stress. In basic analysis of a poem by scansion, accents can be represented by a short vertical line (') preceding the syllable, while the divisions between feet are shown by a slash (/).

There is generally one accent in each foot, for example:

Be-'hold / her, 'sin-/gle 'in / the 'field
Yon 'sol-/i-'tar-/y 'high-/land 'lass!
'Reap-ing / and 'sing-/ing 'by / her-'self;
'Stop here /or 'gent-/ly 'pass.

== See also ==
- Stress (linguistics)
