= Antibacchius =

Metrical foot used in formal poetry

Metrical feet and accents
Disyllables
- ◡ ◡: pyrrhic, dibrach
- ◡ –: iamb
  - ◡: trochee, choree
- –: spondee

Trisyllables
- ◡ ◡ ◡: tribrach
  - ◡ ◡: dactyl
- ◡ – ◡: amphibrach
- ◡ ◡ –: anapaest, antidactyl
- ◡ – –: bacchius
  - ◡ –: cretic, amphimacer
  - – ◡: antibacchius
- – –: molossus
- See main article for tetrasyllables.

An antibacchius or antibacchy (also called a palimbacchius) is a rare metrical foot used in formal poetry.

In accentual-syllabic verse an antibacchius consists of two accented syllables followed by one unaccented syllable. Its opposite is a bacchius.

Example:

Blind luck is
loved more than
hard thinking.

== Referenced ==
- Anthon, C. (1844). A System of Latin Prosody and Metre, etc. Harper & Bros. p. 134.
