= Bacchius =

Metrical foot

Metrical feet and accents
Disyllables
- ◡ ◡: pyrrhic, dibrach
- ◡ –: iamb
  - ◡: trochee, choree
- –: spondee

Trisyllables
- ◡ ◡ ◡: tribrach
  - ◡ ◡: dactyl
- ◡ – ◡: amphibrach
- ◡ ◡ –: anapaest, antidactyl
- ◡ – –: bacchius
  - ◡ –: cretic, amphimacer
  - – ◡: antibacchius
- – –: molossus
- See main article for tetrasyllables.

A bacchius (/bəˈkaɪəs/) or bacchy is a metrical foot of three syllables, consisting of one unstressed syllable followed by two stressed ones.

In accentual-syllabic verse we could describe a bacchius as a foot that goes like this:

da	DUM	DUM

Example:

When day breaks

the fish bite

at small flies.

The Christmas carol 'No Small Wonder' by Paul Edwards is a fair example of usage.

The name is thought to come from its use in ancient Greek songs to the god Bacchus.
