= Animula vagula blandula =

Hadrian's last poem

Animula vagula blandula is the first line of a poem which appears in the Historia Augusta as the work of the dying emperor Hadrian.

It has been extensively studied and there are numerous translations. The author of the Historia Augusta was disparaging but later authors such as Isaac Casaubon were more respectful.

Animula vagula blandula
Hospes comesque corporis
Quae nunc abibis in loca?
Pallidula rigida nudula
Nec ut soles dabis iocos

Poor little, wandering, charming soul
Guest and companion of my body,
What place will you go to now?
Pale, stiff, naked little thing,
Nor will you be making jokes as you always do.

It was translated by D. Johnston as follows:

Oh, loving Soul, my own so tenderly,
My life’s companion and my body’s guest,
To what new realms, poor flutterer, wilt thou fly?
Cheerless, disrobed, and cold in thy lone quest,
Hushed thy sweet fancies, mute thy wonted jest.

Some translators take the adjectives in line 4 as neuter plural, agreeing with the word loca (places), but the majority take them as feminine singular, describing the soul.

== Metre ==
Each line is underlyingly an iambic dimeter (u – u – | u – u –), but in lines 1 and 4 the first two long elements have been resolved into two short syllables, making tribrachs (u uu u uu | u – u –).
