= Molossus (poetry) =

Metrical foot

Metrical feet and accents
Disyllables
- ◡ ◡: pyrrhic, dibrach
- ◡ –: iamb
  - ◡: trochee, choree
- –: spondee

Trisyllables
- ◡ ◡ ◡: tribrach
  - ◡ ◡: dactyl
- ◡ – ◡: amphibrach
- ◡ ◡ –: anapaest, antidactyl
- ◡ – –: bacchius
  - ◡ –: cretic, amphimacer
  - – ◡: antibacchius
- – –: molossus
- See main article for tetrasyllables.

A molossus (/məˈlɒsəs/; from Greek μολοσσός) is a metrical foot used in Greek and Latin poetry. It consists of three long syllables. Examples of Latin words constituting molossi are audiri, cantabant, virtutem.

In English poetry, syllables are usually categorized as being either stressed or unstressed, rather than long or short, and the unambiguous molossus rarely appears, as it is too easily interpreted as two feet (and thus a metrical fault) or as having at least one destressed syllable.

Perhaps the best example of a molossus is the repeated refrain of no birds sing in the first and last verse of John Keats's poem "La Belle Dame Sans Merci" (1819) especially for the way it forces the reader to slow down, which is the poetic essence of this metrical foot.

Oh what can ail thee, knight-at-arms,
Alone and palely loitering?
The sedge has withered from the lake
And no birds sing.

The title of Lord Tennyson's poem "Break, Break, Break" (1842) is sometimes cited as a molossus, but in context it can only be three separate feet:

Break, / break, / break,
At the foot / of thy crags, / O sea;
But the ten- / -der grace / of the day / that is dead
Will never / come back / to me.

Clement Wood proposes as a more convincing instance: great white chief, of which an example occurs in "Ballads of a Cheechako" (1907) by Robert W. Service:

For thus the / Great White Chief / hath said, / "In all / my lands / be peace".

However, given that the previous lines in the stanza are constructed predominantly in iambic heptameter – a common form for ballad stanza – it is more likely that the meter appears as:

For thus / the Great / White Chief / hath said, / "In all / my lands / be peace".

The double stress on "White Chief" comes from the substitution of a spondee in place of the iamb, mirroring previous substitutions in the poem, rather than a molossus.

In one literary dictionary, a dubious candidate is given from Gerard Manley Hopkins:

As a dare-gale / skylark / scanted in a / dull cage
Man's mounting / spirit in his / bone-house, / mean house, dwells

If both lines are scanned as four feet, without extra stress on dwells, then the words in boldface become a molossus. Another example that has been given is wild-goose-chase, but this requires that there be no stress on chase, seeing that in Thomas Clarke's "Erotophuseos" (1840), we have:

And led / me im- / -percept- / -ibly,
A wild- / goose chase, / far far / away,

where clearly there is no molossus.

== See also ==
- En rythme molossique (Op. 39 No. 2), an étude for piano by pianist-composer Charles-Valentin Alkan that uses the rhythm of the molossus as a theme.
