= Monometer =

Line of verse with just one metrical foot or dipody

In poetry, a monometer is a line of verse with just one metrical foot.

== Example ==
Monometer can be exemplified by this portion of Robert Herrick's poem "Upon His Departure Hence":

Thus I
Passe by,
And die:
As one,
Unknown,
And gone.

== See also ==
- Trochaic
- Foot (prosody)
