= Scansion =

Representation of poetic meter

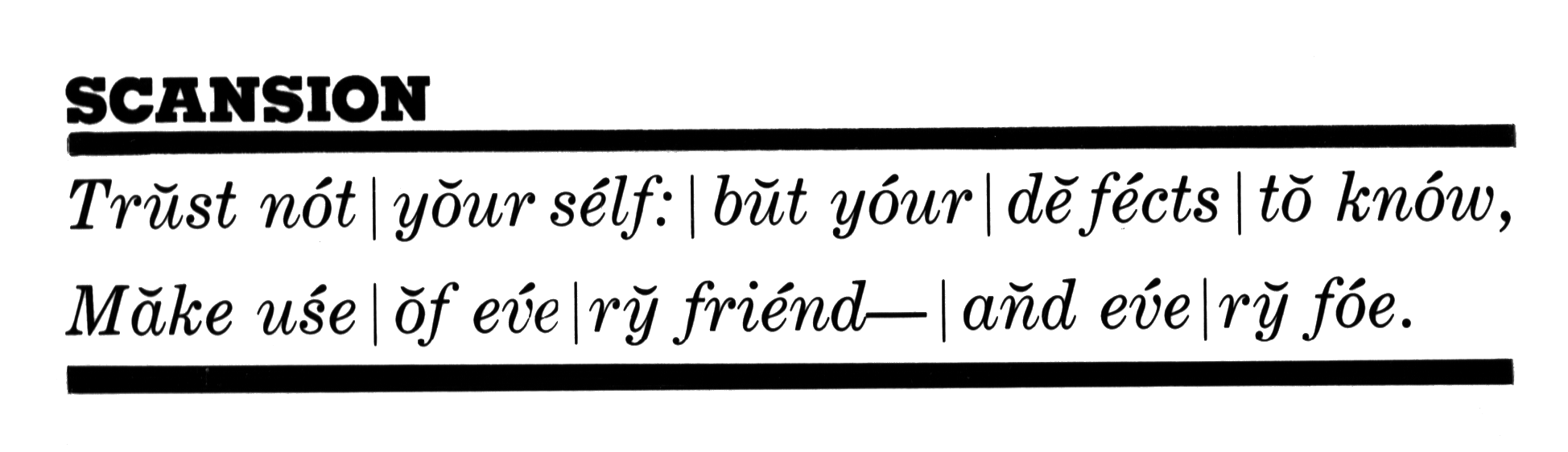
An example of scansion over a quote from Alexander Pope

A system of scansion (/ˈskæn.ʃən/), also known as Scansion for short, is the method or practice of determining and (usually) graphically representing the metrical pattern of a line of verse. In classical poetry, these patterns are quantitative based on the different lengths of each syllable, while in English poetry, they are based on the different levels of stress placed on each syllable. In both cases, the meter often has a regular foot. Over the years, many systems have been established to mark the scansion of a poem.

== Overview ==
Systems of scansion, and the assumptions (often tacit or even subconscious) that underlie them, are so numerous and contradictory that it is often difficult to tell whether differences in scansion indicate opposed metrical theories, conflicting understandings of a line's linguistic character, divergent practical goals, or whether they merely constitute a trivial argument over who has the "better ear" for verse. There is even a debate among scholars as to what systems were inherited from Greek and Roman poetry.

To understand any form of scansion, it is necessary to appreciate the difference between meter and rhythm.

The rhythm of language is infinitely varied. All aspects of language contribute to it: loudness, pitch, duration, pause, syntax, repeated elements, length of phrases, and frequency of polysyllabic words. As C. S. Lewis observes, "If the scansion of a line meant all the phonetic facts, no two lines would scan the same way."

Meter is another matter. It is an ordering of language by means of an extremely limited subset of its characteristics. In English (and in many modern languages) the language is ordered by syllabic stress. All other aspects of language are present, indeed they are vital to the rhythm of the verse; but they are not ordered by the meter.

However, marking stress is not the same as marking meter. A perfectly regular line of iambic pentameter may have anywhere from 2 to 9 stresses, but it is still felt to exhibit 5 pulses or beats. It can most easily be understood through the principle of relative stress. An unstressed syllable between 2 even slightly weaker syllables may be perceived as a beat; and the reverse is true of a stressed syllable between 2 even slightly stronger syllables. These phenomena are called "promotion" and "demotion". Thus a syllable, regardless of its level of stress, that realizes a beat is ictic; and a syllable, regardless of its level of stress, that does not is nonictic. Ictus refers to the position within a line that is experienced as a beat, or to the syllable that fills it.

T. V. F. Brogan issues a stern warning about the temptations of overly detailed scansion:

Since meter is a system of binary oppositions in which syllables are either marked or unmarked (long or short; stressed or unstressed), a binary code is all that is necessary to transcribe it. ... It is natural to want to enrich scansion with other kinds of analyses which capture more of the phonological and syntactic structure of the line ... But all such efforts exceed the boundary of strict metrical analysis, moving into descriptions of linguistic rhythm, and thus serve to blur or dissolve the distinction between meter and rhythm. Strictly speaking, scansion marks which syllables are metrically prominent – i.e. ictus and nonictus – not how much. Scansions which take account of more levels of metrical degree than two, or intonation, or the timing of syllables are all guilty of overspecification.

Prosodists seldom explicitly state what they are marking in their scansions. For clarity, scansions that mark only ictus and nonictus will be called "metrical scansions", and those which mark stress or other linguistic characteristics will be called "rhythmic scansions".

== Elements ==
Minimally, graphic scansion requires only two symbols, designating ictic and non-ictic syllables. These symbols are typically placed over the first vowel in every syllable. Some prosodists indicate only ictic (or, in rhythmic scansion, only stressed) syllables, but it is not ideal since the number, position, and character of non-ictic syllables is also metrically significant.

Additionally, many prosodists divide a line into feet—the minimal repeated units—using a vertical bar (|). When feet are thus designated, words that span feet are divided without hyphens, and any punctuation that occurs at a foot break is typically omitted.

  ×  /    ×  /    ×   /     ×  /      ×    /
When I | consid | er how | my light | is spent[11]

Not all prosodists agree that foot scansion is helpful. For example, in trisyllabic measures (anapestic, amphibrachic, dactylic) it is often quite arbitrary where one divides the feet, and the salient fact seems to be the number of non-ictic syllables —in this case two— between each ictus, rather than whether the repeated pattern is imagined as ××/, ×/×, or /××. Foot analysis tends to imply that there is a special relationship among syllables within feet which does not apply across feet, but it is doubtful. Furthermore, iambic pentameter (despite its name) may be better described as a series of 10 positions than of 5 feet, especially since the sequence ××// may be interpreted as the swapping of ictic and non-ictic positions across feet, suggesting that if feet constitute any kind of boundary at all, it is a porous one indeed.

Finally, a caesura may be indicated. In the great majority of verse in English caesurae are not part of the metrical pattern, and generally it is better not to include them in English scansion. If they are to be marked: (1) if feet are being marked with a bar (|) then caesurae will be marked with a double bar (||) and will replace the foot marker when they occur in the same place; (2) if feet are not marked then caesurae may be marked with a single bar. The fourteener typically does have a metrical caesura; examples of style (1) and (2) are shown below:

      ×   /       ×  /    ×   /      ×  /       ×    /     ×     /    × /
(1) The prince | ly pal | ace of | the sun || stood gor | geous to | behold
    ×    /   ×  /  ×    /   ×   /     ×   /  ×   /  ×      /
(2) On stately pillars builded high | of yellow burnished gold[13]

== Classical notation ==
Modern scansion is a result of adaptation of classical quantitative scansion, where meter was defined on the duration of each syllable in a line. Multiple symbols are used:

- — for long syllable or long element
- u for short syllable or short element
- ῡ for brevis in longo
- | for end of foot
- ‖ main caesura

Notes:

- words are hyphenated wherever they include the end of a foot e.g Trō-iae below;
- long and short vowels are marked with - and u directly above them e.g. Ā, ă, ĭ, ī, ō, ŏ, ŭ, ū (these don't indicate syllable lengths)

== Common 2- 3- and 4-level notations ==
=== 2-level notations ===
Metrical scansion explicitly requires a 2-level notation. Because of the variety of stress levels in language, 2-level notation is not adequate for a rhythmic scansion of any sensitivity. Yet, because of the confusion between rhythm and meter, the number of levels used is no sure indication of a prosodist's intent.

Classical	Slash & breve	Slash & x	Notes
–	/	/	Ictus (or stressed syllable in rhythmic scansion)
˘	˘	x or ×	Nonictus (or unstressed syllable in rhythmic scansion)

Classical: This notation simply retains the classical symbols for "long" and "short" syllables – the macron (or longum) and breve (or brevis) – and repurposes them for "ictic" and "nonictic" (or "stressed" and "unstressed"). Because it quite literally doesn't mean what it says, it is generally out of favor with metrists. This notation has been used by George Saintsbury and Edgar Allan Poe.

Slash & breve: This notation replaces the macron with a slash (or the graphically similar acute accent), the more common symbol for either ictus or stress. Though the classical breve is still present, its pairing with slash indicates that it has been relieved of its original "short" meaning. This notation has the advantage that its symbols can be incorporated into words as diacritics ("áccĕntĕd sýllăblĕ"). However, this can be seen as implying that syllables are being marked as stressed or short which would be a nonsensical scansion. This notation has been used by Paul Fussell and Miller Williams.

Slash & x: This notation is unambiguous (apart from the question of whether "/" indicates stress or ictus), easy to type, and frequently used. It is the notation preferred by the Poetry WikiProject for Wikipedia articles displaying scansion. It could be utilized as diacritics only using the relatively obscure x above ("aͯ") or times above ("a̽") and therefore typically set in 2 lines (1 for the verse, and 1 for the scansion). This notation has been used by James McAuley, Timothy Steele, Robert B. Shaw, and the Princeton Encyclopedia of Poetry and Poetics; and as a secondary method by Derek Attridge.

  ×  / ×     /      ×    /      ×    /      ×    /
When Ajax strives, some rock's vast weight to throw,
  ×  /    ×   / ×     /     ×  /     ×     /
The line too labours, and the words move slow;[15]

This metrical scansion does not attempt to show the various rhythmic features that would occur in a competent reading. Nor does it imply that the line should be read monotonously in only 2 registers ("when Ajax STRIVES some ROCK'S vast WEIGHT to THROW"). Its simple function is to show how these lines relate to other lines of verse by marking whether syllables fill ictic or nonictic positions in the line.

=== 3-level notations ===
Although both lines of Pope quoted above are metrically identical regular pentameters, they create that same basic metrical pattern in very different ways. To show it, one must note the rhythm, not just the meter, of the lines, and recourse must be had to additional levels of notation. In the instance below, the third symbol (\) designates stressed but demoted syllables:

  ×  / ×     /      \    /      \    /      ×    /
When Ajax strives, some rock's vast weight to throw,
  ×  /    \   / ×     ×     ×  /     \     /
The line too labours, and the words move slow;

If the meanings of all 3 symbols are defined and used strictly enough, a 3-level scansion can be both metrical and rhythmic; however, typically it will gravitate toward the rhythmic, as this scansion does. In the second line, "and" is both unstressed and ictic, but the scansion marks it only as unstressed. Although now a better representation of the rhythm of the line, Brogan's chickens have come home to roost: the first line's 3-level scansion may tend to obscure the basic metrical pattern, but the second line's scansion actually falsifies it. (Does the second line comprise 4 or 6 metrical prominences? The answer is, still, 5, but that could not be deduced from this rhythmic scansion.)

Hamer	Wright	Turco	Corn	Notes
/	/	/	3	Primary stress
\	\	•	2	Secondary stress (specific definitions vary by prosodist; for some it may simply designate any secondary stress, or it may designate demoted (stressed & nonictic) syllables, promoted (unstressed & ictic) syllables, or both)
x or ×	˘	˘	1	Unstressed

Enid Hamer's notation has also been used by Harvey Gross and Susanne Woods, and it is the graphical basis for Derek Attridge's more complex notation (below).

=== 4-level notations ===
4-level scansion is generally a sign of a more linguistically oriented prosodist at work. Otto Jespersen introduced his numeric notation in 1900 (in Danish; English translation in 1933). He occasionally added a 5th level, indicating a fully stressed syllable further emphasized by phrasal stress. In 1951 Trager & Smith posited 4 phonemic levels of stress in English. It was in a broad linguistic context, not specifically pertaining to verse; nevertheless, in the 1950s and 1960s linguistically oriented prosodists (such as John Thompson, Harold Whitehall, and Seymour Chatman) attempted to use these 4 levels of stress to formulate a fuller explanation of meter. Chomsky & Halle did not specifically address verse, but their notation of stress (effectively, Jespersen's turned upside-down) was also influential; Chomsky & Halle posited more than 4 levels of stress, but typically only 4 are used in scansion.

Jespersen	Trager-Smith	Chomsky-Halle	Wimsatt-Beardsley	Notes
4	/	1	///	Strongest stress (typically ictic)
3	^	2	//	Secondary stress
2	\	3	/	Tertiary stress
1	˘	4	[no mark]	Least stress (typically nonictic)

In addition to 4 levels of stress, Trager & Smith posited 4 levels of pitch, and 4 levels of juncture (basically the smoothness of transition between syllables). All 3 suprasegmentals have been used by prosodists to map out lines of verse; it comes about as close to C.S. Lewis's "all the phonetic facts" as possible, and constitutes (as Chatman makes explicit), neither the meter nor even the "phonetic facts" of the text, but a transcription of one reading of the text. Here superscript numerals indicate pitch, and "|" and "#" indicate juncture.

   ˘    ˘    / ˘  ˘  ^       ˘ ^     ˘  /      ˘   /
²There was ³never a sound²|²beside the wood²|²but ³one# [16]

Jespersen was not the first to use numerals to mark stress, Alexander John Ellis used them (starting with 0 for least stress) as early as 1873. Nor were W.K. Wimsatt & Monroe Beardsley the first to use multiple slashes: none other than Thomas Jefferson used a 5-level notational system of accents ("////" for strongest stress, down to "/" for little stress, and no mark for "no" stress).

Steele and McAuley have used Jespersen's 4-level notation as a secondary method. Wimsatt, Woods, and The New Princeton Encyclopedia of Poetry and Poetics have used Chomsky's & Halle's notation as a secondary method.

One of the primary virtues of 4-level scansion is that it helps clarify a surprisingly specific—and surprisingly controversial—debate. Take the rhythmically complex line:

When to the sessions of sweet silent thought[18]

Some prosodists hear "-ions of sweet si-" as a very light iamb, followed by a very heavy iamb, yielding a 2-level metrical scansion of:

  /   ×   ×  /     ×    /    ×    /    ×     /
When to the sess | ions of sweet si | lent thought

("Foot" markers are used here merely to emphasize the syllables in question. Recall that this metrical scansion does not imply that "of" is necessarily spoken with more emphasis than "sweet", only that they fill ictic and nonictic positions, respectively.)

However, other prosodists hold that, just as the usual 2nd position ictus has been switched to 1st position, so the usual 6th position ictus has been switched to 7th, yielding:

  /   ×   ×  /     ×    ×    /    /    ×     /
When to the sess | ions of sweet si | lent thought

In this case, "-ions of sweet si-" is sometimes taken as a pyrrhic foot followed by a spondee, and sometimes as a single 4-syllable unit (a minor or rising ionic) that replaces 2 iambic feet. It is a case in which 2-level scansion is felt to miss something essential even by some rather strict prosodists. In fact, Groves has shown that in such cases, where the ictus moves forward (as opposed to backward as in "When to"), each of the 4 positions in question has slightly different constraints that must be fulfilled for the line to be perceived as metrical. In layman's terms, these constraints are most often realized as 4 rising positions; in Jespersen's notation:

  3   2   1  4     1    2    3    4    1     4
When to the sess | ions of sweet si | lent thought

In this case, everyone is somewhat right: the 4 positions are like a light then a heavy iamb, and like a pyrrhic followed by a spondee, and like a 4-syllable "ascending foot" that functions as a unit.

== Rhythmi-metrical scansion ==
The two main approaches to scansion result in a conundrum: metrical scansion necessarily ignores significant differences in stress, the very signal that meter orders; yet rhythmic scansion obscures meter and tends to be overly subjective. Jespersen provided the components of a solution to this problem by both (1) marking multiple levels of syllable stress, and (2) defining the meter of iambic pentameter as a series of 10 syllabic positions, differentiated by rising or falling levels of stress. Numeric stress levels are as described above, and "a" and "B" represent weak and strong positions in the line; alternatively (3) "a/b\a/b..." represents relatively stressed or unstressed positions, where the slash and backslash simply indicate stress levels increasing or decreasing.

(1)   2  4 1     4      3    4      3    4      1    4
    When Ajax strives, some rock's vast weight to throw,
(2)   a  B a     B      a    B      a    B      a    B

(1)   1  4    3   4 1     2     1  4     3     4
    The line too labours, and the words move slow;
(3)   a /b  \ a / b\a  /  b  \  a /b  \  a  /  b

However, Jespersen did not fully integrate his notation (even to the level implied by the scansions above). It remained for the Russian linguistic-statistical school to systematize it; in their 1968 study of Russian verse, A. N. Kolmogorov and A. V. Prokhorov used a system which made both stress and ictus explicit simultaneously. This basic approach has subsequently been used to scan English verse by Marina Tarlinskaja, Derek Attridge, and Peter L. Groves, though their systems differ in detail and purpose.

In addition to making rhythm and meter distinct, all three prosodists provide explicit rules for assigning stress levels so that, as far as possible, it becomes an objective process driven by lexicon and syntax, rather than depending upon the "ear" of the scanner. Their works must be consulted for details, but a simplified version of Groves's rules can provide a first approximation:

- Primary stress: the primarily stressed syllable in content words (nouns, verbs, adjectives, and adverbs).
- Secondary stress: the secondarily stressed syllables of polysyllabic content words; the most strongly stressed syllable in polysyllabic function words (auxiliary verbs, conjunctions, pronouns, prepositions); subsidiary stress in compound words.
- Unstressed: unstressed syllables of polysyllabic words; monosyllabic function words.

For comparative purposes, the following table is a somewhat simplified rendition of these scansion systems. Attridge (1982) and Groves scan ictus/nonictus on a separate line.

	Tarlinskaja 1987		Attridge	Attridge 1995		Groves
	Ictic	Nonictic	1982	Ictic	Nonictic	1998
Primary	⊥	∈	+s	/	/	A
Secondary	⊤	∋	s	\	\	B
Unstressed	–	∪	-s	x	x	O

Tarlinskaja, Attridge, and Groves each exhibit distinct conceptions regarding the dispositions of ictus and nonictus.

=== Marina Tarlinskaja ===
Tarlinskaja uses scansion as a basis for statistical analysis of verse. She has used several versions of the scansion levels shown above, some more and some less fine-grained, and some reduced to numerical values; but all relate to this basic 3 × 2 structure. In the metrical component of her scansion, she (like Jespersen) marks the ictic and nonictic positions of the meter, not of the line. It allows her to compare patterns across hundreds or thousands of verse lines statistically, using a consistent matrix of positions. Thus in the line

  ∈   –  ∪  ⊥   ∪   –    ∈    ⊥ ∪     ⊥
When to the sessions of sweet silent thought

where both Attridge and Groves (and most prosodists, for that matter) would say that the first syllable is ictic, Tarlinskaja rigidly keeps the ictus in the second position, which is its "average" position across iambic pentameter.

=== Derek Attridge ===
Attridge's scansion is intended to be broadly applicable, using a few symbols and rules to describe a wide range of English lines consistently, without a priori reducing them to one metrical system. Like Tarlinskaja, he considers that ictus and nonictus (in his notation B for "beat" and o for "offbeat") always alternate, but matches beats to prominent syllables by allowing offbeat positions to be filled by 0, 1, or 2 syllables (represented by ô, o, and ǒ respectively). The top line represents his "single-line" scansion from 1995, and the lower lines uses his original two-line system of 1982; they are theoretically identical, only graphically different.

  /   x   x  /  x    x    / [x]/ x     /
When to the sessions of sweet silent thought
 +s  -s  -s  +s -s   -s   +s  +s -s    +s[22]
  B     ǒ     B    ǒ       B ô B  o     B

=== Peter L. Groves ===
To date, Groves has put forward his system only as an explanation of iambic pentameter (or "the English heroic line" as he prefers to call it), though elements may be applicable to other accentual-syllabic meters.

He begins his rhythmic scansion with a three-level label for all syllables, but goes much further by elaborating rules describing how contiguous syllables impinge upon each other. The result is a map of the lexical and syntactic character of a line's syllables, which results in stress; rather than a representation of stress levels themselves.

Status	Major	Minor	Weak	Notes
Independent	A	B	O	A syllable of any of the three main categories that is neither impinged upon by a neighbor, nor specially emphasized in context (e.g. by contrastive accent).
Dominated/Subordinated	a	b	o	Prevented from carrying a beat by a stronger neighbor (except "a", which can be allowed in loose versification).
Inhibited/Demoted	Ā		Ō	Ā is "demoted": it cannot dominate or subordinate a neighbor; Ō is "inhibited": it is discouraged, but not wholly prevented, from carrying a beat.
Accented	A	B	O	Specially emphasized in context (e.g. contrastive accent); these syllables may impinge more strongly on their neighbors than regular A, B, O.

Ictus (S for "strong") and nonictus (w for "weak") have constraints on which syllable statuses can fill them. These rules for matching syllable status and metrical position are called "mapping rules", and strict (e.g. Alexander Pope) versus loose (e.g. William Shakespeare) styles of iambic pentameter can be defined by applying different mapping rules.

Further, while his metrical scansion begins as a familiar wSwSwSwSwS, he allows "w" and "S" to trade places under certain conditions, and when they do their mapping rules are altered, requiring additional symbols. In the first (rhythmic) line of scansion, syllables that impinge on their neighbors are connected by hyphens; in the second (metrical) line, positions that have switched places and therefore altered their mapping rules are connected by hyphens.

When to the sessions of sweet silent thought
  A---Ō   o—A—o    Ō----a----A-o     A[23]
  Ś---w   w  S  w    W----s    S w     S

== Other methods of scansion ==
=== Musical scansion ===
In 1880, Sidney Lanier published The Science of English Verse, in which he developed a novel theory exploring the connections between musical notation and meter in poetry. Although some figures such as T.S. Osmond and Harriet Monroe praised it, others did not view it kindly. For example, Vladimir Nabokov in his Notes on Prosody says: "In my casual perusals, I have of course slammed shut without further ado any such works on English prosody in which I glimpsed a crop of musical notes." (pages 3–4) Harvey Gross' criticism also described the theory as lacking in good sense, saying "it scatters sand in the eyes and pours wax in the ears."

One account cited that musical scansion was an experimental technique during the nineteenth century but was obscured by the then-existing conventional scansion. An interpretation of the notion of musical scansion states three theories: 1) beats occur at regular intervals of time; 2) syllables of a verse can be grouped in measures or "bars"; and 3) beats form a hierarchy of strength.

=== Robert Bridges ===
Symbol	Syllable Type	Notes
^	Stressed	Syllable carries the stress
–	Heavy	Is genuinely long, slows down the reading. For example: broad, bright, down.
˘	Light	All syllables with short vowels, even those that would be long 'by position' in Classical terms. That is, if the consonants around a short vowel do not genuinely retard the syllable then it will be counted 'light'. Light also includes all classically short syllables. For example, the second syllables of 'brighter' and 'brightest' are both light, despite the consonants in the latter. (Bridges also mentions "short" as a subset of "light" syllables, but with "seldom any cause to distinguish" between them; he is not found to have scanned any syllables specifically as short.)

=== George R. Stewart ===
Symbol	Notes
S	Stressed syllable
o	unstressed syllable
l	light stressed syllable
O	heavy unstressed syllable
p	pause in place of unstressed syllable
P	pause in place of stressed syllable
L	normally light stress raised to greater prominence in dipodic verse

Stewart's notation influenced John Crowe Ransom and John Thompson, though they did not use his full roster of symbols.

== Other symbols ==
- The metrical triseme (⏗), tetraseme (⏘) and pentaseme (⏙) occur in the Miscellaneous Technical section, Ancient Greek Musical Notation block, of the Unicode standard. They were used in musical notation to represent irregular scansion – places where two syllables or three syllables must be sung in the same time as one regular syllable, or vice-versa.

== Bibliography ==
- Maxwell, Ian. Scansion Scanned. Australia: English Teachers' Group, 1967.
- Sinclair, Vanessa. Scansion in Psychoanalysis and Art: The Cut in Creation. United Kingdom: Taylor & Francis, 2020.
- Halper, B.. The Scansion of Mediaeval Hebrew Poetry. United States: Dropsie College for Hebrew and Cognate Learning, 1913.
