= Pyrrhic =

Metric foot in Greek poetry

Metrical feet and accents
Disyllables
- ◡ ◡: pyrrhic, dibrach
- ◡ –: iamb
  - ◡: trochee, choree
- –: spondee

Trisyllables
- ◡ ◡ ◡: tribrach
  - ◡ ◡: dactyl
- ◡ – ◡: amphibrach
- ◡ ◡ –: anapaest, antidactylus
- ◡ – –: bacchius
  - ◡ –: cretic, amphimacer
  - – ◡: antibacchius
- – –: molossus
- See main article for tetrasyllables.

A pyrrhic (/ˈpɪrɪk/; Greek: πυρρίχιος pyrrichios, from πυρρίχη pyrrichē) is a metrical foot used in formal poetry. It consists of two unaccented, short syllables. It is also known as a dibrach.

== In classical Greek poetry ==
Although the pyrrhic by itself is not used in analysis of classical Greek prosody, examples exist of epigrammatic poems that employ nothing but short syllables (except at line ends where a syllable always scans long), creating a pyrrhic-like effect, such as an epigram addressed to the Cynic philosopher Diogenes and recorded in the Suda:

Διόγενες, ἄγε, λέγε, τίς ἔλαβέ σε μόρος ἐς Ἄϊδος; ἔλαβέ με κυνὸς ὀδάξ.

Diógenes, áge, lége, tís élabé se móros es Áïdos? élabé me kunòs odáx.

== Poetic use in English ==
Tennyson used pyrrhics and spondees quite frequently, for example, in In Memoriam:

When the blood creeps and the nerves prick.

"When the" and "and the" in the second line may be considered as pyrrhics (also analyzable as ionic meter).

Pyrrhics alone are not used to construct an entire poem in English due to the monotonous effect. Edgar Allan Poe observed that many experts rejected it from English metrics and concurred:

The pyrrhic is rightfully dismissed. Its existence in either ancient or modern rhythm is purely chimerical, and the insisting on so perplexing a nonentity as a foot of two short syllables, affords, perhaps, the best evidence of the gross irrationality and subservience to authority which characterise our Prosody.

== War dance ==
By extension, this rhythmic pattern apparently formed the basis of an identically named ancient Greek war dance. Proclus thought it was the same as the hyporcheme (hyporchēma), while Athenaeus distinguished them; this may have depended on whether song accompanied the dance. Citing Aristoxenus, Athenaeus said the pyrrhic is a Spartan dance for boys carrying spears to prepare for war, and noted the intense speed of the dance. In Plato's Laws, the dance is described as representing the offensive and defensive movements in battle. Other Greeks associated it with Dionysus. There are a number of Classical and later reliefs that depict pyrrhic dancers, even if the motif was not widely used during the Roman era.
