= Dimeter =

In poetry, a dimeter /ˈdɪmɪtər/ is a metrical line of verse with two feet. The particular foot can vary.

Consider Thomas Hood's "Bridge of Sighs," in which the first line of a pair is of two feet, each composed of three syllables, and the subsequent line is of two feet, each of two syllables.

Take her up \\ tenderly,
Lift her \\ with care,
Fashioned so \\ slenderly,
Young and \\ so fair.

Also, the first line of William Wordsworth's "We Are Seven":

A simp \\ le Child
