= Spondee =

Metrical foot with two long (or accented) syllables

Metrical feet and accents
Disyllables
- ◡ ◡: pyrrhic, dibrach
- ◡ –: iamb
  - ◡: trochee, choree
- –: spondee

Trisyllables
- ◡ ◡ ◡: tribrach
  - ◡ ◡: dactyl
- ◡ – ◡: amphibrach
- ◡ ◡ –: anapaest, antidactyl
- ◡ – –: bacchius
  - ◡ –: cretic, amphimacer
  - – ◡: antibacchius
- – –: molossus
- See main article for tetrasyllables.

A spondee (Latin: spondeus) is a metrical foot consisting of two long syllables, as determined by syllable weight in classical meters, or two stressed syllables in modern meters. The word comes from the Greek σπονδή, spondḗ, 'libation'.

== Spondees in Ancient Greek and Latin ==
=== Libations ===
Sometimes libations were accompanied by hymns in spondaic rhythm, as in the following hymn by the Greek poet Terpander (7th century BC), which consists of 20 long syllables:

Ζεῦ πάντων ἀρχά,
πάντων ἀγήτωρ,
Ζεῦ, σοὶ σπένδω
ταύτᾱν ὕμνων ἀρχάν.

Zeû pántōn arkhá,
pántōn āgḗtōr,
Zeû, soì spéndō
taútān húmnōn arkhán.

"Zeus, Beginning of all things,
Leader of all things,
Zeus, I make a libation to Thee
this beginning of (my) hymns."

=== In hexameter poetry ===
However, in most Greek and Latin poetry, the spondee typically does not provide the basis for a metrical line in poetry. Instead, spondees are found as irregular feet in meter based on another type of foot.

For example, the epics of Homer and Virgil are written in dactylic hexameter. This term suggests a line of six dactyls, but a spondee can be substituted in most positions. The first line of Virgil's Aeneid has the pattern dactyl-dactyl-spondee-spondee-dactyl-spondee:

– ᴗ ᴗ | – ᴗ ᴗ | – – | – – | – ᴗ ᴗ | – –
arma virumque canō, Trōiae quī prīmus ab ōrīs
'I sing of arms and of the man, who first from the shores of Troy...'

Most of Virgil's lines, like the above, are a mixture of dactyls and spondees. However, sometimes he will begin a line with three or four spondees for special effect, such as the following, which describes how Aeneas and his companion made their way slowly down a dark passage into the Underworld. In this line all the feet are spondaic except the fifth:

– – | – – | – – | – – | – ᴗ ᴗ | – –
ībant obscūrī sōlā sub nocte per umbram
'They began moving in the darkness beneath the lonely night through the shadow'

Spondees can also add solemnity, as in the following lines where Dido, Queen of Carthage, curses Aeneas after he has abandoned her. The first line begins with three spondees, the second with four:

– – | – – | – – | – ᴗ ᴗ | – ᴗ ᴗ | – –
– – | – – | – – | – – | – ᴗ ᴗ | – –
Sōl, quī terrārum flammīs oper(a) omnia lūstrās,
tūqu(e) hār(um) interpres cūrār(um) et cōnscia Iūnō,...
'O Sun, who surveyest all the works of the world with thy flames,
and Thou, interpreter and witness of these sorrows, Juno...'

Only two hexameter lines in Latin poetry use spondees throughout the verse. One is by Ennius:

– – | – – | – – | – – | – – | – –
ollī respondit rēx Albāī Longāī
'to him replied the King of Alba Longa'

The other is in an elegiac couplet in the last poem of Catullus (116), perhaps mocking the poetic style of his addressee:

– – | – – | – – | – – | – – | – –
– – | – ᴗ ᴗ | – || – ᴗ ᴗ | – ᴗ ᴗ | –
quī tē lēnīrem nōbīs, neu cōnārēre
tēl(a) īnfesta meum mitter(e) in usque caput
'with which I could soften your attitude towards me, and so that you would not try
to keep hurling hostile missiles at my head'

== Spondees in English verse ==
In Latin and Greek meter spondees are easily identified because the distinction between long and short syllables is unambiguous. In English meter indisputable examples are harder to find because metrical feet are identified by stress, and stress is a matter of interpretation.

For example, the first part of this line from Shakespeare's Troilus and Cressida (in iambic pentameter) would normally be interpreted as two spondees:

Crý, crý! Tróy búrns, or élse let Hélen gó.

The effect of spondees in verse is often to slow the line down and to represent slow movement. Thus Alexander Pope writes, in a poem illustrating how the sound of the words should imitate their meaning:

When Ajax strives, some Rock's vast Weight to throw,
The Line too labours, and the Words move slow;

In the first line above, most of the syllables, even those in weak positions, are long and heavy: "A-jax strives some Rock's vast weight"; only the last foot, "to throw", is a true iamb. The final foot of the second line "move slow" is another spondee replacing an iamb.

John Masefield also uses spondees effectively in the line:

Dirty British / coaster with a / salt-caked / smoke-stack

Here the last four syllables make two spondees, contrasting with the eight short syllables in the first two feet. The length and weight of the last four syllables derives partly from the fact that all of them are closed by one or more consonants, and partly from the fact that all of them are stressed.

Another Masefield poem, Sea Fever (1902), which includes spondees contains these lines:

And the wheel's kick and the wind's song and the white sail's shaking,
And a grey mist on the sea's face, and a grey dawn breaking.

== See also ==
- Prosody (Latin)
- Metrical phonology, linguistic theory that considers metrical feet
