= Accentual-syllabic verse =

Verse with a fixed number of syllables and stresses

Accentual-syllabic verse is an extension of accentual verse which fixes both the number of stresses and syllables within a line or stanza. Accentual-syllabic verse is highly regular and therefore easily scannable. Usually, either one metrical foot, or a specific pattern of metrical feet, is used throughout the entire poem; thus one can speak about a poem being in, for example, iambic pentameter. Poets naturally vary the rhythm of their lines, using devices such as inversion, elision, masculine and feminine endings, the caesura, using secondary stress, the addition of extra-metrical syllables, or the omission of syllables, the substitution of one foot for another.

Accentual-syllabic verse dominated literary poetry in English from Chaucer's day until the 19th century, when the freer approach to meter championed by poets such as Samuel Taylor Coleridge and Ralph Waldo Emerson and the radically experimental verse of Gerard Manley Hopkins and Walt Whitman began to challenge its dominance. In the early 20th century, accentual-syllabic verse was largely supplanted by free verse in literary poetry through the efforts of Modernists such as Ezra Pound and Amy Lowell. Nonetheless, some poets, such as Robert Frost, W. H. Auden, Keith Douglas, Robert Lowell, Philip Larkin, Howard Nemerov, James Merrill, Derek Walcott, Geoffrey Hill, Seamus Heaney and Derek Mahon continued to work (though not exclusively) in accentual-syllabic meters throughout the century.

Though it has not regained its position of dominance within literary English poetry, accentual-syllabic verse remains viable and popular in the 21st century, as evidenced by the success of such poets as Richard Wilbur and the various New Formalists. Moreover, although free verse dominates published literary poetry, rhymed verse—accentual-syllabic or accentual—has never ceased to predominate in the lyrics of both popular and folk music.

== Examples ==
The Gashlycrumb Tinies, a 1963 book by Edward Gorey, is written in strict 10-syllable lines consisting of three dactyls plus a final stressed syllable:

A is for Amy who fell down the stairs
B is for Basil assaulted by bears
C is for Clara who wasted away
D is for Desmond thrown out of a sleigh
...

"She Walks in Beauty", an 1814 poem by Lord Byron, is written in strict iambic tetrameter:

She walks in beauty, like the night
Of cloudless climes and starry skies;
And all that's best of dark and bright
Meet in her aspect and her eyes:
Thus mellow'd to that tender light
Which heaven to gaudy day denies.

One shade the more, one ray the less,
Had half impair'd the nameless grace
Which waves in every raven tress,
Or softly lightens o'er her face;
Where thoughts serenely sweet express
How pure, how dear their dwelling-place.

And on that cheek, and o'er that brow,
So soft, so calm, yet eloquent,
The smiles that win, the tints that glow,
But tell of days in goodness spent,
A mind at peace with all below,
A heart whose love is innocent!

Robert Browning's One Word More is an example of 10-syllable lines in trochaic metre:

There they are, my fifty men and women
Naming me the fifty poems finish’d!
Take them, Love, the book and me together.
Where the heart lies, let the brain lie also.

Anapestic lines can be found in Robert Browning's Summum Bonum:

All the breath and the bloom of the year in the bag of one bee:
All the wonder and wealth of the mine in the heart of one gem:
In the core of one pearl all the shade and the shine of the sea:
