= Metrical foot =

Basic repeating rhythmic unit in a line of poetry

The foot is the basic repeating rhythmic unit that forms part of a line of verse in most Indo-European traditions of poetry, including English accentual-syllabic verse and the quantitative meter of classical ancient Greek and Latin poetry. The unit is composed of syllables, and is usually two, three, or four syllables in length. The most common feet in English are the iamb, trochee, dactyl, and anapaest. The foot might be compared to a bar, or a beat divided into pulse groups, in musical notation.

A metrical foot is, in classical poetry, a combination of two or more short or long syllables in a specific order; although this "does not provide an entirely reliable standard of measurement" in heavily accented Germanic languages such as English. In these languages it is defined as a combination of one stressed and one or two unstressed syllables in a specific order.

In general, lines of verse can be classified according to the number of feet they contain, using the terms monometer, dimeter, trimeter, tetrameter, pentameter, hexameter, heptameter, and octameter, although seven or more feet in a line is uncommon. Pentameter is the most common in English verse. However, some lines of verse are not considered to be made up of feet, for example hendecasyllable lines.

In some kinds of metre, such as the Greek iambic trimeter, two feet are combined into a larger unit called a metron (pl. metra) or dipody.

== Etymology ==
The English word "foot" is a translation of the Latin term pes, plural pedes, which in turn is a translation of the Ancient Greek πούς, pl. πόδες. The Ancient Greek prosodists, who invented this terminology, specified that a foot must have both an arsis and a thesis, that is, a place where the foot was raised ("arsis") and where it was put down ("thesis") in beating time or in marching or dancing. The Greeks recognised three basic types of feet, the iambic (where the ratio of arsis to thesis was 1:2), the dactylic (where it was 2:2) and the paeonic (where it was 3:2).

== Classical meter ==
Below listed are the names given to the poetic feet by classical metrics. The feet are classified first by the number of syllables in the foot (disyllables have two, trisyllables three, and tetrasyllables four) and secondarily by the pattern of vowel lengths (in classical languages) or syllable stresses (in English poetry) which they comprise.

The following lists describe the feet in terms of vowel length (as in classical languages). Translated into syllable stresses (as in English poetry), "long" becomes "stressed" ("accented"), and "short" becomes "unstressed" ("unaccented"). For example, an iamb, which is short-long in classical meter, becomes unstressed-stressed, as in the English word "alone".

A short syllable in this context is known as an arsis, while a long one is known as a thesis.

=== Disyllables ===
Macron and breve notation: – = stressed/long syllable, ◡ = unstressed/short syllable

◡	◡	pyrrhus, dibrach
◡	–	iamb (or iambus or jambus)
–	◡	trochee, choree (or choreus)
–	–	spondee

=== Trisyllables ===
◡	◡	◡	tribrach
–	◡	◡	dactyl
◡	–	◡	amphibrach
◡	◡	–	anapaest, antidactyl
◡	–	–	bacchius
–	◡	–	cretic, amphimacer
–	–	◡	antibacchius
–	–	–	molossus

=== Tetrasyllables ===
◡	◡	◡	◡	tetrabrach, proceleusmatic
–	◡	◡	◡	primus paeon
◡	–	◡	◡	secundus paeon
◡	◡	–	◡	tertius paeon
◡	◡	◡	–	quartus paeon
–	–	◡	◡	major ionic, double trochee
◡	◡	–	–	minor ionic, double iamb
–	◡	–	◡	ditrochee
◡	–	◡	–	diiamb
–	◡	◡	–	choriamb
◡	–	–	◡	antispast
◡	–	–	–	first epitrite
–	◡	–	–	second epitrite
–	–	◡	–	third epitrite
–	–	–	◡	fourth epitrite
–	–	–	–	dispondee

== See also ==
- Accent (poetry)
- Syllable weight
