= Syllable weight =

Linguistic concept

In linguistics, syllable weight is the concept that syllables pattern together according to the number and/or duration of segments in the rime. In classical Indo-European verse, as developed in Greek, Sanskrit, and Latin, distinctions of syllable weight were fundamental to the meter of the line.

== Linguistics ==
A heavy syllable is a syllable with a branching nucleus or a branching rime, although not all such syllables are heavy in every language. A branching nucleus generally means the syllable has a long vowel or a diphthong; this type of syllable is abbreviated as CVV. A syllable with a branching rime is a closed syllable, that is, one with a coda (one or more consonants at the end of the syllable); this type of syllable is abbreviated CVC. In some languages, both CVV and CVC syllables are heavy, while a syllable with a short vowel as the nucleus and no coda (a CV syllable) is a light syllable. In other languages, only CVV syllables are heavy, while CVC and CV syllables are light. In yet other languages, CVV syllables are heavy and CV syllables are light, while some CVC syllables are heavy (for instance if the coda is a sonorant) and other CVC syllables are light (for instance if the coda is an obstruent). Some languages distinguish a third type, CVVC syllables (with both a branching nucleus and a coda) and/or CVCC syllables (with a coda consisting of two or more consonants) as superheavy syllables.

In moraic theory, heavy syllables are analyzed as containing two morae, light syllables one, and superheavy syllables three.

The distinction between heavy and light syllables plays an important role in the phonology of some languages, especially with regard to the assignment of stress. For instance, in the Sezer stress pattern in Turkish observed in place names, the main stress occurs as an iamb (i.e. penultimate stress) one syllable to the left of the final syllable: (L'L)σ. However, when the foot contains a heavy syllable in the first syllable while the second syllable is light, the iamb shifts to a trochee (i.e. antepenultimate stress) because there is a requirement that main stress fall on a heavy syllable whenever possible: ('HL)σ, and not *(H'L)σ.

== Classical poetry ==
=== Basic definition ===
In Ancient Greek hexameter poetry and Latin literature, lines followed certain metrical patterns, such as based on arrangements of heavy and light syllables. A heavy syllable was referred to as a longum and a light as a brevis (and in the modern day, reflecting the ancient terms, a longum is often called a "long syllable" and a brevis a "short syllable", potentially creating confusion between syllable length and vowel length).

Similarly, in Classical Sanskrit meter, metrical patterns consisted of arrangements of syllable weight groups, called gaṇas (parallel to Greek metrical feet). A heavy syllable was named guru, and a light syllable was laghu.

A syllable was considered heavy if it contained a long vowel or a diphthong (and was therefore "long by nature"—it would be long no matter what) or if it contained a short vowel that was followed by more than one consonant ("long by position", long by virtue of its relationship to the consonants following). On the other hand, a syllable was light if it was an open syllable and contained only a short vowel.

An example in Latin:

Arma virumque canō, Troiae quī prīmus ab ōrīs
Ītaliam fātō profugus Lāvīniaque vēnit
(Aeneid 1.1-2)

The first syllable of the first word (arma) is heavy ("long by position") because it contains a short vowel (the A) followed by more than one consonant (R and then M)—and if not for the consonants coming after it, it would be light. The second syllable is light because it contains a short vowel (an A) followed immediately by only one consonant (the V). The next syllable is light for the same reason. The next syllable, the second syllable of the word virumque, is heavy ("long by position") because it contains a short vowel followed by more than one consonant (the M and then the Q).

But, for example, the first syllable of the word Troiae is heavy ("long by nature") because it contains a diphthong, regardless of the sounds coming after it. Likewise, the fifth syllable of the second line (the first of the word fātō) is heavy ("long by nature") because it contains a long vowel, and it will be heavy no matter what sounds come after. (The word "Ītaliam" is a special case, in that poets treat it as having a long-by-nature first syllable which it actually has not, in order to make it fit somehow.)

Terming a syllable "long by position" is equivalent to noting that the syllable ends with a consonant (a closed syllable), because Latin and Greek speakers in the classical era pronounced a consonant as part of a preceding syllable only when it was followed by other consonants, due to the rules of Greek and Latin syllabification. In a consonant cluster, one consonant ends the preceding syllable and the rest start the following syllable. For example, Latin syllabifies volat as vo-lat but dignus as dig-nus and monstrum as mon-strum.

=== Exceptions and additions ===
A few exceptions to and elaborations of the above rules of heavy and light syllables:

- The Greek letters ζ, ξ, ψ (zeta, xi, and psi) and their Roman equivalents Z and X (and PS) were pronounced as two consonants, so they lengthen by position despite being represented by a single character. For example, the first syllable of gaza is heavy, despite the short vowel followed only by one written consonant, because the Z was pronounced as two consonants and lengthens the syllable by position.
- Sanskrit meter also treats the letters अं and अः (the anusvara and visarga) as full consonants for purposes of syllable weight, despite being classified typically as vowels.
- The combination stop–liquid (usually) or stop–nasal (sometimes) cohered in both Latin and Greek; that is, the two consonants were pronounced together with the speed of one consonant. As a result, they did not lengthen by position if the poet did not want them to (although they could if the poet chose). For example, the first syllable of patris is generally light, even though it has a short vowel followed by two consonants, because the consonants cohere (and the word is syllabified pa-tris). However, the combination aspirate-nasal or voiced consonant-nasal did not cohere and always lengthened by position.
- In Homer and his imitators, the digamma (ϝ), a sound defunct in the standard Ionic alphabet and lost from pronunciation by the classical period, was still felt enough to lengthen by position, even though it is normally not written in the Homeric poems. For example, in the line ἦ τοι μὲν τόδε καλὸν ἀκουέμεν ἐστὶν ἀοιδοῦ (Odyssey, 9.3), the first syllable of καλὸν is long, even though it has a short vowel followed by only one consonant, because the word was originally καλϝὸν, and the digamma was still felt enough to lengthen the syllable by position. Since the digamma was being lost during the time when the Homeric poems were composed, recited, and written down, its effects are sometimes not felt, so that words that would have contained a digamma sometimes do not show its effects.

As noted above, the number and order of heavy and light syllables in a line of poetry (together with word breaks) articulated the meter of the line, such as the most famous classical meter, the epic dactylic hexameter.

== See also ==
- Meter (poetry)
- Stress (linguistics)
