= Latin prosody =

Study of Latin poetic laws of metre

Latin prosody (from Middle French prosodie, from Latin prosōdia, from Ancient Greek προσῳδία prosōidía, 'song sung to music', 'pronunciation of syllable') is the study of Latin poetry and its laws of meter. The following article provides an overview of those laws as practised by Latin poets in the late Roman Republic and early Roman Empire, with verses by Catullus, Horace, Virgil and Ovid as models. Except for the early Saturnian poetry, which may have been accentual, Latin poets borrowed all their verse forms from the Greeks, despite significant differences between the two languages.

== Background ==
=== A brief history ===
The start of Latin literature is usually dated to the first performance of a play by Livius Andronicus in Rome in 240 BC. Livius, a Greek slave, translated Greek New Comedy for Roman audiences. He not only established the genre fabula palliata, but also adapted meters from Greek drama to meet the needs of Latin. He set a precedent followed by all later writers of the genre, notably Plautus and Terence. The principles of scansion observed by Plautus and Terence (i.e. the rules for identifying short and long syllables, the basis of Greek and Latin meter) are mostly the same as for classical Latin verse. (Note: Two significant differences are that word-final s may not be counted as making a long syllable, and mute-plus-liquid combinations never make a syllable long. R. H. Martin, Terence: Adelphoe, Cambridge University Press (1976), page 32) Livius also translated Homer's Odyssey into a rugged native meter known as Saturnian, but it was his near contemporary, Ennius (239–169 BC), who introduced the traditional meter of Greek epic, the dactylic hexameter, into Latin verse. Ennius employed a poetic diction and style well suited to the Greek model, thus providing a foundation for later poets such as Lucretius and Virgil to build on.

The late republic saw the emergence of Neoteric poets. They were rich young men from the Italian provinces, conscious of metropolitan sophistication. They, and especially Catullus, looked to the scholarly Alexandrian poet Callimachus for inspiration. The Alexandrians' preference for short poems influenced Catullus to experiment with a variety of meters borrowed from Greece, including Aeolian forms such as hendecasyllabic verse, the Sapphic stanza and Greater Asclepiad, as well as iambic verses such as the choliamb and the iambic tetrameter catalectic (a dialogue meter borrowed from Old Comedy). Horace, whose career spanned both republic and empire, followed Catullus' lead in employing Greek lyrical forms, though he calls himself the first to bring Aeolic verse to Rome. He identified with, among others, Sappho and Alcaeus of Mytilene, composing Sapphic and Alcaic stanzas, and with Archilochus, composing poetic invectives in the Iambus tradition (in which he adopted the metrical form of the epode or "iambic distich"). He also wrote dactylic hexameters in conversational and epistolary style. Virgil, his contemporary, used dactylic hexameters for both light and serious themes, and his verses are generally regarded as "the supreme metrical system of Latin literature".

Modern scholars have different theories about how Latin prosody was influenced by these adaptations from Greek models.

=== Two rhythms ===
In English poetry the alternation of stressed and unstressed syllables produces an "accentual rhythm." In Classical Greek meter the alternation of long and short syllables (also called heavy and light syllables) produces a "quantitative rhythm." Classical Latin meter obeyed rules of syllable length, like Greek meter, even though Latin words bore stress.

Modern scholars have differed about how these different influences affect the way Latin verse was sounded out. Accentual rhythm in Latin may have been observed in pre-classical verse (in Saturnian meter) and in some medieval verse, but otherwise the rhythm of Latin verse appears ambivalent and complex. (Ancient Greek was characterized by pitch, which rose and fell independently of the mora-timed rhythm.) Latin readers probably gave words their natural stress, so that the quantitative metrical pattern acted as an undercurrent to the stresses of natural speech. Here, for example, is a line in dactylic hexameter from Virgil's Georgics when the words are given their natural stress:

      quíd fáciat laétas ségetes, quó sídere térram,

and here is the same verse when the metrical pattern is allowed to determine the stress:

      quíd faciát laetás segetés, quo sídere térram.

Possibly the rhythm was held in suspense until stress and meter happened to coincide, as it generally does towards the end of a dactylic hexameter (as in "sídere térram" above). English-speaking, as opposed to e.g. German-speaking, readers of Latin tend to observe the natural word stress, whose interplay with the quantitative rhythm can be a source of aesthetic effects.

== Prosody ==
=== Quantity ===
Generally a syllable in Latin verse is long when

- it has a long vowel or a diphthong (scrī-bae) or
- it ends in two consonants or a compound consonant (dant, dux)
- it ends in a consonant and is followed by a syllable that begins with a consonant (mul-tos; dat sonitum) or
- it is the final syllable in a line of verse i.e. brevis in longo, under that hypothesis.

Otherwise syllables are counted as short.

Syllables ending in a vowel are called open syllables, and those ending in a consonant are called closed syllables. Long syllables are sometimes called heavy and short ones light. Consonants preceding the vowel do not affect quantity.

For the above rules to apply

- the digraphs ch, th, ph, representing single Greek letters, count as one consonant;
- h at the beginning of a word is ignored;
- qu counts as one consonant;
- x and z each count as two consonants;
- A plosive (p, b, t, d, c, g) followed in the same word by a liquid (r, l) can count as either one consonant or two. Thus syllables with a short vowel preceding certain such combinations, as in agrum or patris, can be long (ag-rum, pat-ris) or short (a-grum, pa-tris), at the poet's choice. This choice is not permitted, as a rule, in compound words, e.g. abrumpo, whose first syllable must remain long, or for all plosive-liquid combinations.
- A final short open vowel standing before a plosive followed by a liquid in the following word remains short, save very rarely, as in Virgil's licentious "lappaeque tribolique", where the first -que is scanned as long. A short open final vowel may not stand before other double consonants in the same line, again with rare licentious exceptions such as Ovid's "alta Zacynthus", where the final a remains short. (Note that Zacynthus cannot be mentioned in hexameter verse without licence.)

In the comedies of Plautus and Terence some other exceptions to these rules are found, most notably the phenomenon called brevis brevians, in which an unstressed long syllable can be shortened after a short one, e.g. vidēn hanc? ("do you see this woman?"), which is scanned u u –. By another exception found in early poetry, including Lucretius, a final -is or -us with short vowels, coming before a word with initial consonant, can sometimes still count as short, as in omnibu(s) rēbu(s) profundant, Lucretius 4.1035, scanned – u u – u u – –.

Vowel length is thus vitally important for scansion. Apart from those given above, there are some rules to determine it, especially in the inflected parts of words. However, rules do not cover all vowels by any means, and, outside the rules, vowel lengths just have to be learnt.

=== Feet ===
Verses were divided into "feet" by ancient grammarians and poets, such as Ovid, who called the elegiac couplet "eleven-footed poetry" (Amores 1.30). This practice is followed by traditionalists among modern scholars, especially, perhaps, those who compose Latin verses. In foot-based analysis, the "metrically dominant" part of the foot is sometimes called the "rise" and the other is called the "fall," the Greek terms for which are arsis and thesis. In Greek, these terms were applied to the movement of human feet in dancing and/or marching, Arsis signifying the lifting of a foot, and Thesis its placement. In the Greek scheme Thesis was the dominant part of the meter, but the Romans applied the terms to the voice rather than to the feet, so that Arsis came to signify the lifting of the voice and thus the dominant part of the meter (William W. Goodwin, Greek Grammar, MacMillan Education (1894), page 348). This caused confusion, as some authors followed the Greek custom and others the Latin; thus these terms are no longer generally used. Sometimes the dominant part of the foot, in either quantitative or stressed verse, is called the ictus.

Long and short syllables are marked (-) and (u) respectively. The main feet in Latin are:

- Iamb: 1 short + 1 long syllable (cărō)
- Trochee: 1 long + 1 short (mēnsă)
- Dactyl: 1 long + 2 shorts (lītŏră)
- Anapaest: 2 shorts + 1 long (pătŭlaē)
- Spondee: 2 longs (fātō)
- Tribrach: 3 shorts (tĕmĕrĕ)

According to the laws of quantity, 1 long = 2 shorts. Thus a Tribrach, Iamb and Trochee all equate to the same durations or morae: each of them comprises 3 morae. Similarly a Dactyl, an Anapaest and a Spondee are quantitatively equal, each being 4 morae. These equivalences allow for easy substitutions of one foot by another e.g. a spondee can be substituted for a dactyl. In certain circumstances, however, unequal substitutions are also permitted.

It is often more convenient to consider iambics, trochaics and anapaests in terms of metra rather than feet; for each of these families, a metron is two feet. Thus the iambic metron is u – u –, the trochaic – u – u and the anapestic u u – u u –.

==== Cola: a different way to look at it ====
The division into feet is a tradition that produces arbitrary metrical rules, because it does not follow the actual metrical structure of the verse (see for example the listed variations in the tables below). In particular, though a long syllable and two short ones have the same number of morae, they are not always interchangeable: some metres permit substitutions where others do not. Thus a more straightforward analysis, favoured by recent scholarship, is by cola, considered to be the actual building blocks of the verse. A colon (from the Greek for "limb") is a unit of (typically) 5 to 10 syllables that can be re-used in various metrical forms.

Standard cola include the hemiepes, the glyconic, and the lekythion.

=== Elision ===
A vowel at the end of a word does not count as a syllable if the following word begins with a vowel or h: thus Phyllida amo ante alias reads as Phyllid' am' ant' alias. This is called elision. At the (rare) discretion of the poet, however, the vowel can be retained, and is said to be in Hiatus. An example of this, in Virgil's fémineó ululátú the "o" is not elided.

A word ending in vowel + m is similarly elided (sometimes this is called Ecthlipsis): thus nec durum in pectore ferrum reads as nec dur' in pectore ferrum.

=== Caesura ===
In modern terms, a caesura is a natural break which occurs in the middle of a foot, at the end of a word. This is contrasted with diaeresis, which is a break between two feet. In dactylic hexameter, there must be a caesura in each line, and such caesuras almost always occur in the 3rd or 4th foot.

There are two kinds of caesura:

- strong (or masculine), when the caesura occurs after a long syllable;
- weak (or feminine), when the caesura occurs after a short syllable.

== Meters ==
The dividing of verse into long and short syllables and analysis of the metrical family or pattern is called 'scanning' or 'scansion.' The names of the metrical families come from the names of the cola or feet in use, such as iambic, trochaic, dactylic and anapaestic meters. Sometimes meter is named after the subject matter (as in epic or heroic meter), sometimes after the musical instrument that accompanied the poetry (such as lyric meter, accompanied by the lyre), and sometimes according to the verse form (such as Sapphic, Alcaic and elegiac meter).

=== Guide to symbols used ===
- — for long syllable or long element
- u for short syllable or short element
- ῡ for brevis in longo
- | for end of foot
- ‖ main caesura

Notes:

- words are hyphenated wherever they include the end of a foot e.g Trō-iae below;
- long and short vowels are marked with - and u directly above them e.g. Ā, ă, ĭ, ī, ō, ŏ, ŭ, ū (these don't indicate syllable lengths)

There are four basic families of verse: dactylic, iambic (and trochaic), Aeolic, and anapestic. In the dactylic family short syllables come in pairs, and these pairs may be contracted (two short replaced by one long). In the iambic/trochaic family short syllables come one at a time, and some long elements may be resolved (one long replaced by two short). In the anapestic family short syllables come in pairs, and both contraction and resolution are allowed. In the Aeolic family there are both paired and single short syllables, and neither contraction nor resolution is allowed. Other important metres are hendecasyllabics and the Asclepiads, and Catullus composed important poetry in Glyconics. There are individual Wikipedia entries on various metres. A would-be composer in any metre, however, would need a more detailed knowledge than can be found here.

=== Dactylic meters ===
The "dactyl," as a foot, is — u u; the name comes from the Greek for "finger," because it looks like the three bones of a finger, going outward from the palm. The principal colon of dactylic verse is the "hemiepes" or "half-epic" colon, — u u — u u — (sometimes abbreviated D). The two short syllables (called a biceps element) may generally be contracted, but never in the second half of a pentameter, and only rarely in the fifth foot of a hexameter. The long syllable (the princeps element) may never be resolved. Roman poets use two dactylic forms, the hexameter and the elegiac couplet.

==== Dactylic hexameter ====
Dactylic hexameter was used for the most serious Latin verse. Influenced by Homer's Greek epics, it was considered the best meter for weighty and important matters, and long narrative or discursive poems generally. Thus it was used in Ennius's Annals, Lucretius's On The Nature of Things, Virgil's Aeneid and Ovid's Metamorphoses; also in Juvenal's caustic satires and Horace's genial Talks and Letters.

A dactylic hexameter consists of a hemiepes, a biceps, a second hemiepes, and a final long element, so DuuD—. This is conventionally re-analyzed into six "feet," all dactyls with the last one either catalectic or necessarily contracted. Roman poets rarely contract the fifth foot. (Note: According to the stress-timed theory of Latin prosody, there is a strong tendency to harmonize word-stress and verse-ictus in the final two feet of a hexameter. The fifth foot, therefore, is almost always a dactyl whereas the sixth foot always consists of a spondee; this line ending is perhaps the most notable feature of the meter. In classical times, it was the only readily audible metrical feature, and Romans unfamiliar with Greek literature and versification often heard no sound pattern at all save in the stress-pattern of the last two feet (William Sidney Allen, Vox Latina: a Guide to the Pronunciation of Classical Latin, 2nd edition, Cambridge University Press (2003) ISBN 0-521-37936-9, pages 86, 127).) Since Latin was richer in long syllables than was Greek, contraction of biceps elements (producing the so-called spondee) was more common among Roman poets. Neoteric poets of the late republic, such as Catullus, sometimes employed a spondee in the fifth foot, a practice Greek poets generally avoided and which became rare among later Roman poets.

Variations	1st	2nd	3rd	4th	5th	6th (Note: In some schemes, the final syllable in the 6th foot is marked either long or short to reflect the natural syllable length, but it is always long by position and it is therefore only marked long in this table.)
dactyls	— u u	— u u	— u u	— u u	— u u	— —
spondees	— —	— —	— —	— —		

There will be a caesura in the third or fourth foot (or in both). If there is a weak caesura, or none, in the third foot, there will usually be a strong one in the fourth, as in these two examples from Virgil:

sī nescīs, meus ille caper fuit, et mihi Dāmōn ...
et nōbīs īdem Alcimedōn duo pōcula fēcit ...

but here is a line from Virgil with only one caesura, a weak one:

frangeret indēprēnsus et irremeābilis error.

Variations are common, and are used to avoid monotony. Their absence would be a definite fault of versification. Various positions for caesura (in the foot-based analysis) have traditional names: the caesura "in the third foot" is called penthemimeral, that in the fourth hephthemimeral, and that in the second trihemimeral. These names refer to the number of half-feet before the position of the caesura. Here is the introduction to Virgil's epic poem, the Aeneid.

 -  u  u| -   u  u| -||  -| -    -|  - u  u |- - 
 Ărmă vĭ-rŭmquĕ că-nō, Trō-iae quī prīmŭs ăb ōrīs
 - u u|-   -| - ||  u u| -   -| -  u  u| - -
 Ītălĭ-ǎm fā-tō   prŏfŭ-gŭs Lā-vīniăquĕ vēnĭt
  - u u | -       - |     -   - | - || - | - u  u |-  -
 lītŏră, mŭlt(um) ĭl-l(e) ĕt tĕr-rīs  iăc-tātŭs ĕt ăltō
  -  u u| - ||  - | -   u u| -   -| - u  u |- -
 vī sŭpĕ-rŭm,  sae-vae mĕmŏ-rĕm Iū-nōnĭs ŏb īrăm;

There are two elisions in line 3 and a bucolic diaeresis in line 1 (quī | prīmus ). The 'i' in 'Troiae' and 'iactatus', the first 'i' in 'Iunonis' and the second 'i' in 'Laviniaque' are all treated as consonants.

Dactylic hexameter often has a bucolic diaeresis (a caesura coinciding with the end of the fourth foot), which has this name because it is common in bucolic or pastoral verse. (NB, however, that this term is sometimes, or even usually, reserved for lines where the fourth foot is a dactyl, as in

forte sub argūtā cōnsīdĕrăt īlice Daphnis.)

Dactylic hexameters regularly end with a disyllabic or a trisyllabic word. Exceptions tend to be Greek words.

==== Dactylic pentameter ====
The name "pentameter" comes from the fact that it consists of two separate parts, with a word-break between them, with each part, or hemiepes, having two and a half feet, summing to five (thus giving Ovid his count of eleven feet in a couplet). The first hemiepes may have contraction, the second may not. By Ovid's time there was a rule, with very few exceptions, that the last word should be of two syllables, and it was almost always a noun, verb, personal pronoun (mihi, tibi or sibi) or pronominal adjective (meus etc.). The last syllable would either be closed, or a long open vowel or a diphthong: very seldom an open short vowel.

Variations	1st	2nd	½	3rd	4th	½
	— u u	— u u	—	— u u	— u u	—
spondees	— —	— —				

There is a strong danger of monotony in this rigid structure, which poets were able to alleviate, up to a point, by keeping the first half of a line out of conformity with the stricter rules governing the second half, and by varying as much as possible the word-pattern of the second half.

===== Elegiac couplet =====
An elegiac couplet is a dactylic hexameter followed by a dactylic pentameter. The sense of the hexameter frequently runs into the pentameter, an effect known as enjambement, but a pentameter comparatively seldom runs on into a following hexameter. The pentameter came into Latin usage later than the hexameter and therefore it was not always handled with rigour by Catullus, compared for example with the later poets, especially Ovid. Catullus used elisions very freely, and sometimes he even allowed an elision to span the central diaeresis (e.g. Carmina 77.4). The following is from one of his most famous elegies, mourning for a lost brother (Carmina 101).

  -  - | -   - | - ||- | -  u  u | -  u u| -  -
 Mŭltās pĕr gĕn-tēs  ĕt mŭltă pĕr aequŏră vĕctŭs
      -  u u   | -   u u |- ||  - u   u |-  u u|-
      ădvĕnĭ(o) hās mĭsĕr-ās, frātĕr, ăd īnfĕrĭ-ās
 
 -   -| -   -| -||- |- -  | - u u| -  -
 ŭt tē pŏstrē-mō dōn-ārĕm  mūnĕrĕ mŏrtĭs
      -   -| -   -|  -  ||    -  u  u| -   u u| -
      ĕt mū-tăm nē-quīqu-(am) adlŏquĕ-rĕr cĭnĕ-rĕm,

Note: the diaeresis after the first hemiepes is marked here like a caesura (a conventional practice.) Observe the elisions in line 2 (o) and line 4 (am). The latter elision spans the diaeresis in the last line.

===== First Archilochian =====
If only one hemiepes is employed, instead of a full pentameter, the elegiac couplet takes the form known as the First Archilochian, named after the Greek poet Archilochus. An example is found in the fourth book of Horace's Odes (Carmina 4.7), which A. E. Housman once described as "the most beautiful poem in ancient literature", introduced with these two lines:

 -  -| - u  u|  - || uu| -   - | - u u | - -
Dīffū-gērĕ nĭ-vēs, rĕdĕ-ŭnt iăm grāmĭnă cămpīs
   - u u| -   u  u | -
  ărbŏrĭ-bŭsquĕ cŏm-ae;

==== Dactylic tetrameter catalectic ====
Most extant examples of this meter are found in Lyric poetry, such as Horace's Carmina 1.7 and 1.28, but also in Iambi.

Variations	1st	2nd	3rd	4th
	— u u	— u u	— u u	— —
spondees		— —		

Note: the final syllable in the 4th foot is marked long or short in some schemes to indicate natural syllable length but it is always long by position.

===== Alcmanian strophe =====
A dactylic tetrameter catalectic is sometimes joined to the dactylic hexameter to form a couplet termed the Alcmanian Strophe, named after the lyric poet Alcman (some scholars however refer to the Alcmanian Strophe as the First Archilochian, as indeed there is a strong likeness between the two forms). Examples of the form are found in Horace's Odes (carmina) and Epodes, as here in his Epode 12.

 - u u |  -   - |- ||  - | -  u u |-   u u | -  -
 Ō ĕgŏ | nōn fēl-īx, quăm tū fŭgĭs ŭt păvĕt  ācrīs
  -  u  u| -   u  u| -  u  u|- -
  ăgnă lŭ-pōs căprĕ-aēquĕ lĕ-ōnēs

Note that the plosive + liquid combination pr in 'capreaeque', syllabified ca.pre.ae.que, leaves the first open syllable (ca) metrically short.

=== Iambic meters ===
Iambic meters are made of "metra" or "dipodies" of which the basic shape is | x – u – | (here x represents an anceps element which can be short or long). Except at the end of a verse, the long or anceps elements could be "resolved", that is, replaced by two short syllables, for example | – uu u – | or | uu – u – | or | u – u uu |. Iambic lines could be made of 2, 3, or 4 metra, and could also be catalectic (i.e. missing the last element).

Different authors had different styles of writing iambic verse. In the comedies of Plautus and Terence, there are two anceps elements in each metron, except at the end of the verse, making the metron | x – x – |. Catullus experimented with poems where the anceps was always short, thus | u – u – |. In Seneca's tragedies, on the other hand, the anceps element was usually long, thus his preferred metron was | – – u – |.

==== Iambic trimeter (iambic senarius) ====
The most popular type of iambic meter was the trimeter, also (especially with respect to the form used in comedy) called the iambic sēnārius (meaning "in groups of six"), because it was considered to have six beats (sēnõs ictūs) in each line.

The grammarian Terentianus Maurus has this to say about the iambic trimeter:

  iambus ipse sex enim locīs manet
  et inde nōmen inditum est sēnāriō:
  sed ter ferītur, hīnc trimetrus dīcitur
  scandendo quod bīnōs pedēs coniungimus

 "For the iambus itself remains in six places,
  and for that reason the name ''senarius'' is given;
  But there are three beats, hence it is called a ''trimeter'';
  because when scanning we join together the feet in pairs."

He also says that teachers of metre beat time with their pollex ("thumb or big toe") or their foot to help their pupils.

This meter is found extensively in the comedies of Plautus and Terence, and it was also used in the tragedies of Ennius (of which only fragments survive). The proverbs of Publilius Syrus (1st century BC), and the fables of Phaedrus (1st century AD) are both in this metre, and a few of the poems of Catullus, Horace, and Petronius. The dialogues and speeches of Seneca's tragedies are also written in iambic trimeters.

The comedies of Plautus and Terence have a line of this pattern:

 | x – x – | x – x – | x – u – | 

The five anceps positions are filled by a long syllable more often than a short, but they are not all equal, since the 3rd and 5th anceps elements tend to be short more often than the other three. According to Gratwick, the 1st and 3rd anceps are long (or two shorts) 80% of the time, the 5th 90%, and the 2nd and 4th 60% of the time. When they are long, the 3rd and 5th anceps tend to be unaccented, and thus give the impression of being short.

Any of the long or anceps elements except the last could be resolved into two short syllables. The example below comes from Terence's comedy Phormio 117–8:

 | –  –    u  u u|–   –  –      u  u |–   – u ῡ |
  noster quid agerēt nescīr(e); et illam dūcere
 | u u– –  – | u u– –  – |–  –   u  – |
  cupiēbāt et metuēbāt absentem patrem

 "Our master was at a loss what to do; he both desired
 to marry her and at the same time he was afraid of his absent father."

Some differences in prosody can be seen from later Latin. For example, the long vowel was usually preserved in the 3rd person singular (-bāt etc.); and occasionally a short-long sequence (as in ĕt ǐllam above) could be scanned as two short syllables, especially when a pronoun was involved, a process known as brevis breviāns.

A completely different style of iambic trimeter is found in Catullus's 4th poem, which is written entirely in iambics throughout its 27 lines, with no resolved elements and with every anceps short. Except occasionally at the end of a line, the word-accents correspond entirely to the rhythm of the meter:

 | u  – u  – |u    –  u –|u    –  u – |
  phasēlus ille quem vidētis, hospitēs,
 |u–   u– |u  – u– | u –  u ῡ |
  ait fuisse nāvium celerrimus

 "That sailing-boat which you see, strangers,
  claims to have once been the fastest of boats."

Another style again is seen in the tragedies of the emperor Nero's tutor and prime minister Seneca the Younger. Here, the 1st, 3rd and 5th anceps elements are nearly always long, the 2nd, 4th and 6th invariably short. Resolved elements, such as in the words scĕlĕris or mǎnǐbus are allowed, though less frequently than in comedy. There is always a caesura (word-break) after the 5th element, which ensures that the word-accent comes on the long 4th and 6th elements (adéste scéleris). There are no examples of brevis breviāns. The lines below come from Seneca's Medea 13–15:

 | –     –   u – |u   u u u  –|  – –   u – |
  nunc, nunc adeste sceleris ultrīcēs deae, 
 | –  –   u –|–     – u – | –  –  u – |
  crīnem solūtīs squālidae serpentibus,
 |–  –   u – |–   u u u  –|  – –   u – |
  ātram cruentīs manibus amplexae facem, 

 "Now, now, be present, crime-avenging goddesses!
 Your hair unkempt with waving serpents,
 grasping a black torch in your bloodstained hands."

==== Iambic distich ====
Horace in some of his Epodes combines a trimeter with an iambic dimeter. His style is intermediate between Catullus and Seneca, with the anceps elements sometimes long, sometimes short. As with Seneca, a caesura after the 5th element ensures a regular word-accent on the 4th and 6th element. Resolved elements are used sparingly.

The iambic distich is the basis of many poems of a genre known as Iambus, in which the poet abuses and censures individuals or even communities, whether real or imaginary. Iambic rhythms were felt to be especially suited to this role. The Greek poet Archilochus was one of the main exponents of the iambic distich.

The following is the opening of Horace's Epode 2:

 | u– u  – |u   –   u – | u – u– |
  beatus ille quī procul negōtiīs,
 |–    –  u  –  | –  – u– |
  ut prīsca gēns mortālium,
 | u –  u  –|u  – u  –|–  –  u – |
  paterna rūra būbus exercet suīs
 | u – u  – |–  –  u ῡ |
  solūtus omnī faenore

 "Happy is he who far from business deals,
 like the original race of humans,
 ploughs his ancestral farm with his own oxen,
 free of all money-lending."

==== Iambic tetrameter catalectic (iambic septenarius) ====
Usually associated with the comic theatre, it consists of seven feet with an extra syllable at the end instead of a full iambic foot. In that case it is called iambic septenarius ('septenarius' means grouped in sevens). Used outside the theatre, it is called iambic tetrameter catalectic (catalectic means that the meter is incomplete).

Iambic septenarii are often associated with women in Roman comedy, as in the following line from Plautus's Miles Gloriosus:

  –  –        u –|–   uu   u  ῡ|| u u   –    –  –| –   u u–
 Contempl(a), amabo, mea Scapha, satin haec me vestis deceāt.

 "Just look, I beg you, my dear Scapha, if this dress suits me well"

There is always a dieresis (break) in the middle of the line. The stage allowed many variations of the meter but later poets were quite strict in their use of it. Catullus allowed variations only in the first and fifth feet:

Variations	1a	1b	2a	2b	3a	3b	4a	4b
	u —	u —	u —	u —	u —	u —	u —	—
spondees	— —				— —			

An example is found in Catullus' Carmina 25, beginning with these two lines:

 | u -  u   -| u   -  u- ||  u - u - |u -  -
  cinaede Thalle, mollior / cunīculī capillō
 | u  -  u - | u -  u -||  u  - u     -|u -  - |
  vel ānseris medullulā / vel īmul(ā) ōricillā 

"Sodomite Thallus, softer than the fur of a rabbit or the marrow of a goose or the lobe of an ear."

Catullus uses no variations at all here and he employs diminutives (cunīculī, medullulā, īmulā, ōricillā) contemptuously in a description of the 'soft' Thallus. Doubling of the consonant l lengthens several syllables that are naturally short, thus enabling a strict iambic rhythm.

==== Versus reizianus ====
Other lengths of iambic lines are found in Roman comedy, such as iambic octonarius (16 elements) and the iambic quaternarius (8 elements); and there is also the "colon reizianum" (5 elements), which is used sometimes independently, and sometimes tacked on to the end of a quaternarius to make what is known as a "versus reizianus", for example:

  u u  –  –    –|  u – u –  ||   –  – –   u u–
 Homo núllust té sceléstiór // qui vívat hódie

"there is no man alive today who is more wicked than you!"

==== Choliambics ====
This meter was originated by the Greek iambic poet, Hipponax. The name choliambics means lame iambics and sometimes the meter is called scazons or limpers. ("Lame trochaics" exist as well, being a trochaic tetrameter catalectic with the same ending as the iambic.) It is intended to be graceless and awkward "...in order to mirror in symbolically appropriate fashion the vices and crippled perversions of mankind." It was taken up by the neoteric poets Catullus and his friend Calvus but with fewer variations than Hipponax had employed. It is basically an iambic trimeter but with a surprise ending in the third metron, with an iamb + spondee replacing the usual spondee + iamb, thus crippling the iambic rhythm. As used by Catullus, the variations are as follows:

Variations	1a	1b	2a	2b	3a	3b
	u —	u —	u —	u —	u —	— —
spondees	— —		— —	— —		
tribrachs		uuu				
dactyls	—uu		—uu			

Caesuras are found after the first syllable either in the third or fourth feet, sometimes in both. Lines 2 and 3 of Catullus' Carmina 59 about the grave-robbing wife of Menenius offer a good example:

 |– –   u –|–   –  u        – | u –   – –|
  uxor Menēnī, saepe qu(am) in sepulcrētīs
 | – –  u  – |–  u u u  – |u –  – – |
  vīdistis ipsō rapere dē rogō cēnam

"The wife of Menenius, whom you all have often seen in cemeteries snatching dinner from the pyre itself."

The resolution in the third foot of the second line reinforces the meaning of rapere "to snatch", as she greedily reaches for food from the funeral pyre without regard for taboos.

Martial used more variations, such as an anapaest in the fourth foot and a tribrach in the third.

Choliambics are used by Catullus in eight poems: 8, 22, 31, 37, 39, 44, 59, 60. All of these are attacks on contemporaries (including himself, in poem 8), with the exception of 31, which is a poem in praise of the poet's home town of Sirmio.

=== Mixed dactylic/iambic ===
==== Second Archilochian ====
An iambic dimeter may be followed by a hemiepes to form the second line of a couplet, in which the first line is dactylic hexameter. Thus it resembles an elegiac couplet except that the first half of the pentameter is replaced by an iambic dimeter. This combination is called the second Archilochian. The iambic dimeter keeps the elements of a line-end, i.e. it is marked off from the hemiepes by a pause through brevis in longo, or through a hiatus. An example of this system is found in Horace's Epode 13, lines 9–10:

  -  - |-  - |-  u u |-   u u| -  -|- - 
 perfundī nārdō iuvat et fide Cyllēnaeā 
    u - u  -|-   -  u ῡ|| -  u u|- u u|-
   levāre dīrīs pectora  sollicitūdinibus

"it is delightful to be anointed with perfume and to relieve one's heart from dreadful anxieties with the Cyllenean lyre"

The 5th foot in this example is a spondee—this is rare for Horace and it is meant to evoke the affectation of Neoteric poets like Catullus, thus complementing the sense of being suffused with perfume while listening to the lyre at a drinking party (the Greek word Cyllēnaeā, which creates the double spondee, adds to the exotic aura). The iambic dimeter ends with brevis in longo, the short syllable a in pectora becoming long by the addition of a pause.

==== Third Archilochian ====
Here an iambic trimeter forms the first line of the couplet, and the positions of the iambic dimeter and hemiepes are reversed to form the second line, the hemiepes now coming before the iambic dimeter. The hemiepes still functions as if it were independent, retaining the pause of a line-end through brevis in longo or hiatus. An example has survived in Horace's Epode 11, as in lines 5-6 here:

  -   -  u- | u -  u   - |  -  -  u -
 hic tertius December, ex quō dēstitī
   - u u|-  u u|ῡ || -  -   u -|-   - u -
   Īnachiā furere,  silvīs honōrem dēcutit.

"This is the third winter to have shaken the honour from the woods since I ceased to be mad for Inachia."

==== Pythiambics ====
Another couplet is formed when a line of dactylic hexameter is followed by a line of iambic dimeter, and this is called the First Pythiambic. The Greek poet Archilochus composed in this form but only fragments remain. Two of Horace's epodes (14 and 15) provide complete examples in Latin. The following couplet introduces his Epode 15:

 |-  u u |-   - |-  - |-  -| - u  u|- - |
 Nox erat et caelō fulgēbat lūna serēnō
  |-  -   u -|u  - u ῡ |
   inter minōra sīdera 

"It was night, and the moon was shining in a clear sky amidst the lesser stars."

The Second Pythiambic features an iambic trimeter instead of iambic dimeter in the second line. Horace's Epode 16 is an example.

=== Hendecasyllables ===
The hendecasyllable is an 11-syllable line used extensively by Catullus and Martial, for example in Catullus's famous poem (Catullus 5), which begins:

 - -|-   uu| -  u   |-       u|- -
vīvāmus mea Lesbi(a) atqu(e) amēmus
 - -|-   u  u|-   u|- u|- -
rūmōrēsque senum sevēriōrum
-  - |- uu | -  u|- u |-  -
omnēs ūnius aestimēmus assis!

"Let us live, my Lesbia, and let us love,
and as for the mutterings of over-strict old men
let us count them all as worth one dime!"

Poems in hendecasyllables all run on in the same meter, namely spondee (but see below), dactyl, trochee, trochee, spondee. Catullus is rather freer than Martial, in that he will occasionally start a line with a trochee or iambus, as in lines 2 and 4 respectively of the opening poem of his book, whereas Martial keeps to a spondaic opening.

== Post-classical poetry ==
After the classical period, the pronunciation of Latin changed and the distinction between long and short vowels was lost in the popular language. Some authors continued writing verse in the classical meters, but this way of pronouncing long and short vowels was not natural to them; they used it only in poetry. Popular poetry, including the bulk of Christian Latin poetry, continued to be written in accentual meters (sometimes incorporating rhyme, which was never systematically used in classical verse) just like modern European languages. This accentual Latin verse was called sequentia, especially when used for a Christian sacred subject. Two Christian Latin poems which can be found on Wikipedia, both dating from the 13th century, are the Stabat Mater and Dies Irae.

== See also ==
- Metres of Roman comedy
- Dactylic hexameter
- Trochaic septenarius
- Brevis in longo
- Anceps
- Biceps (prosody)
- Resolution (meter)
- Clausula (rhetoric)
- Golden line
- Latin phonology and orthography

== Bibliography ==
- Allen, William Sidney (2003). Vox Latina — a Guide to the Pronunciation of Classical Latin (2nd ed.). Cambridge University Press. ISBN 0-521-37936-9.
- Cole, Thomas (1972). "The Saturnian Verse". Yale Classical Studies. 21: 3–73.
- Fortson, Benjamin W. 2011. "Latin Prosody and Metrics." In A Companion to the Latin Language. Edited by James Clackson, 92–104. Malden, MA: Wiley-Blackwell
- Freeman, Philip (1998). "Saturnian Verse and Early Latin Poetics". Journal of Indo-European Studies. 26: 61–90.
- Gasparov, M. L. (1996). A History of European Versification. Oxford University Press. ISBN 0-19-815879-3.
- Goldberg, Sander (2005). Constructing Literature in the Roman Republic. Cambridge University Press. ISBN 0-521-85461-X.
- Halporn, James W.; Martin Ostwald; Thomas G. Rosenmeyer (1994) [1963]. The Meters of Greek and Latin Poetry. Hackett. ISBN 0-87220-244-5.
- Mahoney, Anne (2001). "Alliteration in Saturnians". New England Classical Journal. 28: 78–82.
- Morgan, Llewelyn. (2010). Musa Pedestris: Metre and Meaning in Roman Verse. Oxford: Oxford Univ. Press.
- Parsons, J (1999). "A New Approach to the Saturnian Verse". Transactions of the American Philological Association. 129: 117–137.
- Probert, Philomen. 2002. "On the Prosody of Latin Enclitics." Oxford University Working Papers in Linguistics, Philology and Phonetics 7:181–206.
- Putnam, Michael C. J. (2006). Poetic Interplay: Catullus and Horace. Princeton University Press. ISBN 978-0-691-12537-4.
- Raven, David S. (1965). Latin Metre: An Introduction. London: Faber and Faber.
- Watkins, Calvert (1995). How to Kill a Dragon: Aspects of Indo-European Poetics. Oxford University Press. ISBN 0-19-508595-7.
- Wilkinson, L. Patrick. 1963. Golden Latin Artistry. Cambridge, UK: Cambridge Univ. Press.
