= Iambus (genre) =

Genre of ancient Greek poetry

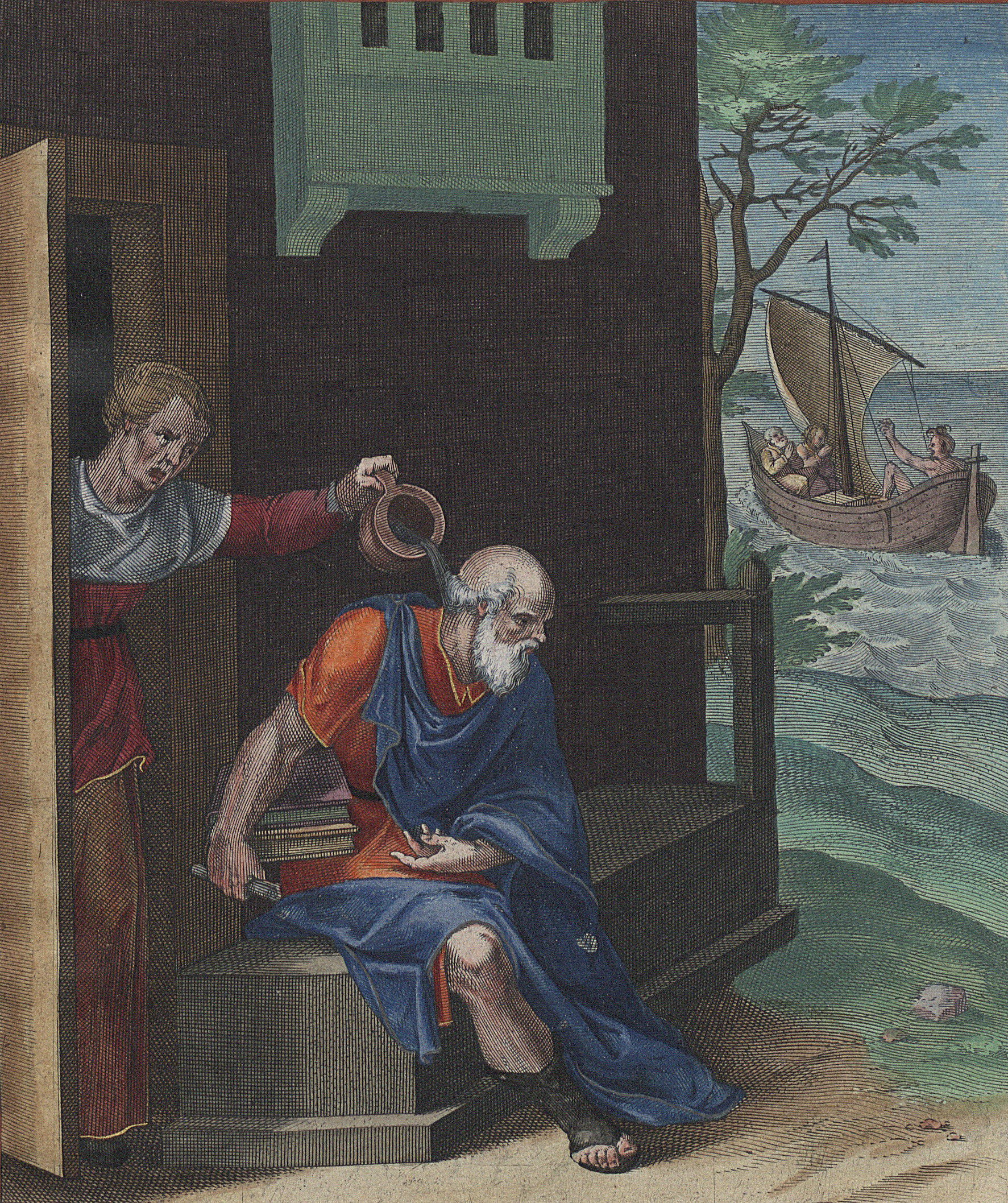
Engraving from Quinti Horatii Flacci Emblemata, Antwerp 1607, showing Socrates receiving the contents of a chamberpot, and a young man bullying his elders in a boat in the background. Iambus depicted the ugly and unheroic side of humanity.

Iambus, or iambic poetry, was a genre of ancient Greek poetry that included but was not restricted to the iambic meter and whose origins modern scholars have traced to the cults of Demeter and Dionysus. The genre featured insulting and obscene language and sometimes it is referred to as "blame poetry". For Alexandrian editors, however, iambus signified any poetry of an informal kind that was intended to entertain, and it seems to have been performed on similar occasions as elegy even though lacking elegy's decorum. The Archaic Greek poets Archilochus, Semonides and Hipponax were among the most famous of its early exponents. The Alexandrian poet Callimachus composed "iambic" poems against contemporary scholars, which were collected in an edition of about a thousand lines, of which fragments of thirteen poems survive. He in turn influenced Roman poets such as Catullus, who composed satirical epigrams that popularized Hipponax's choliamb. Horace's Epodes on the other hand were mainly imitations of Archilochus and, as with the Greek poet, his invectives took the forms both of private revenge and denunciation of social offenders.

== Historical background ==
Originally "iambos" (ἴαμβος) denoted a type of poetry, specifically its content, and only secondarily did it have any significance as a metrical term. This emerges for example from the fact that Archilochus, a famous iambic poet, was once criticized for being "too iambic" (Note: The phrase "too iambic" appears in a fragmentary inscription dated to the third century BC, originally part of a commemorative shrine to Archilochus, "The Archilocheion". The inscription was a part of a record of his life and reception on Paros, where his poetry was deemed offensive by the population until Dionyssus opened their eyes to their own folly by punishing them with some kind of affliction, possibly impotence (the fragment is very patchy at that point). A Pythian oracle then advised them to honour Archilochus and thus a shrine was established to him. (see Archilochus fr. 3 and commentary, D.E. Gerber, Greek Iambic Poetry, 16–25) The genre appears to have originated in the cult of Demeter, whose festivals commonly featured insulting and abusive language (αἰσχρολογία, aischrologia). A figure called "Iambe" is even mentioned in the Homeric Hymn to Demeter, employing language so abusive that the goddess forgets her sorrows and laughs instead. The abuse of a divinity, however, is quite common in other cults too, as an ironic means of affirming piety: "Normality is reinforced by experiencing its opposite".

The common element in all iambus is blame, drawing attention to dangerous or unsuitable behaviours. It is addressed to an audience with shared values and customs, which are represented as under threat, as for example a body of citizens or companions. Whatever its real composition, the audience is cast in the role of mutual friends and their friendship (φιλότης, philotēs or Latin amicitia) is asserted in various ways:

- the poet, speaking in his own person, might criticize someone directly, whether a group member or an outsider;
- the poet might act out the role of someone guilty of misconduct, condemning "himself" in his own words;
- the poet might tell a story, combining 'self-indictments' with a narrative account of misconduct.

Blame ranges from humorous ribbing of friends to merciless attacks on outsiders. Among ancient literary theorists, iambic verse came to be regarded as lower than lyric poetry, partly because iambic meter was thought to be the simplest of verse forms, and the nearest to common speech, but also because of its undignified content.

It isn't clear what role Archilochus played in the development of the literary genre at the beginning of the seventh century. Demeter was a significant deity in his home island, Paros, but she isn't prominent in his surviving poetry. Possibly he became involved in iambus via the cult of Dionysus. This cult's association with iambus seems to be indicated etymologically by the poetic form associated with Dionysus, the dithyramb, a term which appears to include the same root as "iambus". Early dithyrambs were a "riotous affair" and Archilochus was prominent in the controversial development of Dionyssian worship on Paros (possibly in relation to phallic rites).

There is no sure evidence about the original venue for iambic poetry but the drinking party (or symposium) and the cult festival were probably the main occasions. Nor do we know clearly what role iambic poetry played in ancient society. It was certainly complex. It seems to have found voice during times of social change and political dissent, when the poet felt entitled or empowered to preach and condemn. Semonides, probably about the middle of the seventh century, composed iambic verse on a misogynist theme, but without the invective and obscenity of Archilochus. A hundred years after Archilochus, Hipponax was composing choliambs, a deliberately awkward version of the iambic trimeter symbolizing mankind's imperfections and vices, yet by then iambus seems to have been performed mainly for entertainment (our understanding of his work, however, might change significantly when and as more fragments are unearthed). The genre's religious and moral value was evidently not appreciated by the fifth century lyric poet Pindar, who condemned Archilochus for being "sharp-tongued" and "grown fat on the harsh words of hate", yet Archilochus's brand of iambus could still find sympathetic audiences even in the first century AD, when the philosopher, Dio Chrysostom, compared him with Homer in these terms:

For of the two poets who for all time deserve to be compared with no other, namely Homer and Archilochus, Homer praised nearly everything ... But Archilochus went to the opposite extreme, to censure, seeing, I suppose, that men are in greater need of this, and first of all he censures himself ... [thus winning for himself, in Dio's opinion] ... the highest commendation from heaven.

The spread of literacy impacted on all ancient poetry, iambus included. Its influence was already becoming evident in Athens by the fifth century BC, gradually changing the nature of poetry from a performance before a local group to a literary artifact with an international reach. By the Hellenistic period, the librarian/scholar Callimachus claimed to be following the example of Hipponax yet introduced a wider range of content and a more literary and intellectual focus. He also aligned iambus more closely with other genres such as curse poetry (Ἀραί) and farewell poetry (propemptika, προπέμπτικα). Iambus was taken up as a political weapon by some public figures in Rome, such as Cato the Elder, who, in an account by Plutarch:

... betook himself to iambic verse, and heaped much scornful abuse upon Scipio, adopting the bitter tone of Archilochus, but avoiding his license and puerility.

Neoteric poets such as Catullus combined a native tradition of satirical epigram with Hipponax's pungent invective to form neatly crafted, personal attacks. Hipponactean choliambs were among Catullus's most often used meters but the spirit of iambus seems to have infused much of his non-iambic verse as well. Horace nominally modelled his Epodes on the work of Archilochus but he mainly followed the example of Callimachus, relying on painstaking craftsmanship rather than instinctive vitriol and broadening the range of the genre. Thus, for example he introduced a panegyric element in support of Augustus (Epodes 1 and 9), a lyrical element (Epode 13), and a suggestion of love poetry (Epodes 11 and 14). Moreover, his iambic persona is deliberately presented as powerless, in contrast to the swaggering persona of Archilochus. Horace's weak iambic persona is not inconsistent with the genre. Traditionally the iambic poet, though he bullies others, is a victim too. Thus, Archilochus was said to have driven his would-be in-laws to suicide by his invectives after they had cheated him out of a promised marriage, and Hipponax was said to have driven Bupalus to suicide after being caricatured by him in a sculpture. Similarly the author of the Strasbourg fragment below is motivated by revenge. Moreover, Horace's thematic variety is not without parallel among archaic poets such as Archilochus and Hipponax: the mood of the genre is meant to appear spontaneous and that inevitably led to some "hodepodge" contexts. Whatever his unique contribution may have been, Horace still managed to recreate something of the ancient spirit of the genre, alerting his companions to threats facing them as a group, in this case as Roman citizens of a doomed republic:

In the midst of a crisis which could be seen as a result of the decline and failure of traditional Roman amicitia, Horace turned to a type of poetry whose function had been the affirmation of "friendship" in its community. It is doubtful whether he believed that his or anyone else's poetry could avert disaster. But he may have hoped that his iambi would somehow 'blame' his friends and fellow citizens into at least asking themselves quo ruitis [i.e. where are you careering to]?

— D. Mankin (Note: Mankin's latin here refers to the opening to Epode 7, "Quo quo scelesti ruitis?")

== A tale of two ditties ==
The nature of iambus changed from one epoch to another, as becomes obvious if we compare two poems that are otherwise very similar – Horace's Epode 10 (around 30 BC) and the "Strasbourg" papyrus, a fragment attributed either to Archilochus or Hipponax (seventh and sixth century respectively). The modern world became aware of the Greek poem only in 1899, when it was discovered by R. Reitzenstein among other papyri at the University Library of Strasbourg. He published it straight away, recognizing its significance and its resemblance to Horace's poem. This study, however, begins with Horace and it is based on comments by Eduard Fraenkel.

=== Epode 10 ===
Horace's poem is in couplets, where a line of iambic trimeter (six iambic feet) is followed by a line of iambic dimeter (four iambic feet). Here it is broken into four-line stanzas to bring out the intrinsic structure of the poem. The English translation has the same metrical couplets but the rhythm is accentual (the norm for English verse) rather than quantitative (the norm for classical Latin and Greek verse).

Mala soluta navis exit alite
ferens olentem Mevium.
ut horridis utrumque verberes latus,
Auster, memento fluctibus;

niger rudentis Eurus inverso mari
fractosque remos differat;
insurgat Aquilo, quantus altis montibus
frangit trementis ilices;

nec sidus atra nocte amicum appareat,
qua tristis Orion cadit;
quietiore nec feratur aequore
quam Graia victorum manus,

cum Pallas usto vertit iram ab Ilio
in inpiam Aiacis ratem.
o quantus instat navitis sudor tuis
tibique pallor luteus

et illa non virilis eiulatio
preces et aversum ad Iovem,
Ionius udo cum remugiens sinus
Noto carinam ruperit!

opima quodsi praeda curvo litore
porrecta mergos iuverit,
libidinosus immolabitur caper
et agna Tempestatibus.

The ship casts off from shore in an ill-omened hour,
Carrying the stinking Mevius.
God of the southern wind – take care to pulverize
Both its sides with horrendous waves!

Let the black eastern wind turn the sea upside-down,
Some oars here, some rigging there,
And may the north wind loom as large as when it rends
Oaks trembling on the mountain tops,

And not one friendly star appear through the dark night
As Orion sinks in the west!
May the sea carrying him be no more gentle than
The waves the winning Greeks sailed on

That time Athena turned her rage from smouldering Troy
Onto Ajax and his damned ship!
Oh what a cold damp sweating will beset your crew
While you change hue to a pale green,

And oh how woman-like will all that wailing be
And all those prayers ignored by Jove,
When the Ionian sea, resounding with the wet
Southern wind, breaks apart your ship!

If then the rich spoil, scattered round the curving shore,
Lies at the pleasure of the gulls,
There will be sacrifices of a lusty goat
And lamb in honour of the Winds.

It is not known who Mevius is nor what he is supposed to have done wrong. The name could be of a real person but it could also function like "John Doe" and thus it might be a stock figure with some special significance for the original audience. Some scholars identify him with the Maevius rubbished as a contemptible poet by Virgil in Eclogues 3.90 but there is no proof for such an identification. He could represent an imaginary scapegoat intended to avert the gods' anger from the poet's circle of 'friends', a device common in the archaic iambus of Hipponax and Archilochus: in this case, the "friends" may be understood to be Roman citizens at a time of social and political decay. A fictional Mevius would also be consistent with iambus as a mere literary topic, where Horace makes up for the lack of any real context by adding artistic values, in the Hellenistic manner.

The poem is skilfully structured. There is an introduction briefly outlining the situation (lines 1–2), a large midsection made up of curses (lines 3–14) and predictions (15–20), and finally an epilogue (21–24). Three winds (Auster, Eurus, Aquilo) are the chief figures in the main body of the poem and also at the very end (Tempestates). Each wind is assigned its own couplet (lines 3–8), but only the south wind is addressed. The south wind gets another mention, though by a different name, 'Notus' (line 20), so that these two mentions provide the poem with the kind of symmetry found in Ring composition. By the latter part of the poem, however, the south wind is no longer being addressed, a change that happens when Mevius is addressed instead (lines 15–20). This change in addressee is preceded by a mythological episode taken from the heroic Ajax legend, occurring exactly in the middle of the poem (lines 11–14), where it functions as a sort of piano nobile, with curses before and predictions afterwards. In some versions of the poem, Mevius continues to be addressed right to the very end, i.e. iuverit has been taken to be iuveris instead (line 22). Some scholars prefer iuveris since it implies that only Mevius ends up as rich spoil for the gulls, but other scholars argue that it is quite consistent with iambus for the whole crew to be punished on account of one offender, a result implied by the impersonal ending iuverit in the version here. Moreover, the impersonal ending marks a clear break between the epilogue and the main body of the poem.

The intricate structure of the poem reveals Hellenistic influence. A poet of the archaic period, such as Archilochus or Hipponax, might have mentioned this or that wind but not arranged them as neatly as here, assigning each its own couplet. Moreover, the epode bears resemblance to curse poems or Ἀραί, fashionable in the Hellenistic period. On the other hand, Horace leaves out the heavy-handed pedantry of a craftsman like Callimachus. The epode also resembles a "farewell" poem or προπεμπτικόν but with an ironic inversion: in a Hellenistic "farewell" poem, it was conventional to wish upon the traveller a safe voyage and favourable winds, pledging sacrifices if the ship arrived at port. Nevertheless, the ironic genre-bending quality of epode 10 (and some others in the collection) was fairly typical of Hellenistic poetry generally.

To sum up. Horace did not attempt to reproduce the true nature of the old Greek iambus which had partly suggested to him the theme of his epode. His borrowing was confined to the most general outlines of the subject. As if to make up for the resulting loss, he embroidered his own poem with many elaborate devices, most of them derived from Hellenistic poetry. Consequently what had been a weapon in a serious struggle became in his hands a dexterous display of literary patterns.

— Eduard Fraenkel

The "serious struggle" is found in the Strasbourg fragment.

=== Strasbourg papyrus ===
Reitzenstein, the first editor of the fragment, attributed it to Archilochus but, in the following year (1900) Friedrich Blass assigned it to Hipponax. The papyrus includes, among its tattered portions, an incomplete name (Ἱππωνά.., Hippona..), which seems to support Blass's identification since Hipponax often mentions himself by name in his extant work. However, the brilliance of the poem's invective suggests it is the work of a more significant poet i.e. Archilochus. Some scholars conclude that the fragment is not a single poem, assigning part to Archilochus and the rest to Hipponax.

Like Horace's epode above, the verse below is made of couplets, but the meter is a bit different. An initial line of iambic trimeter in this case is followed by a hemiepes (two dactyls then an emphatic final syllable). The English translation follows it closely but in accentual rhythm. The opening lines are lost and the square brackets indicate another lost portion. The square brackets are not in the English version, replaced by an "educated guess" suggested by Eduard Fraenkel. A few more letters were lost in the original but scholars are in general agreement about their identity and those gaps are not shown here. The comments are also largely based on Fraenkel's work. Despite all the gaps in the original, the fragment supplies a key meaning absent from Horace's epode – a motive for hate.

.....
κύματι πλαζόμενος·
κἀν Σαλμυδησσῶι γυμνὸν εὐφρονέστατα
Θρήϊκες ἀκρόκομοι
λάβοιεν – ἔνθα πόλλ᾽ ἀναπλήσει κακὰ
δούλιον ἄρτον ἔδων –
ῥίγει πεπηγότ᾽ αὐτόν· ἐκ δὲ τοῦ χνόου
φυκία πόλλ᾽ ἐπέχοι,
κροτέοι δ᾽ ὀδόντας, ὡς κύων ἐπὶ στόμα
κείμενος ἀκρασίηι
ἄκρον παρὰ ῥηγμῖνα κυμα[...]
ταῦτ᾽ ἐθέλοιμ᾽ ἂν ἰδεῖν,
ὅς μ᾽ ἠδίκησε, λὰξ δ᾽ ἐφ᾽ ὁρκίοισ᾽ ἔβη,
τὸ πρὶν ἑταῖρος ἐών.

....
Drifting about in the swell;
When he comes nude to Salmydessus, may the kind
Thracians, their hair in a bun,
Take him in hand – there he shall have his fill of woe,
Slavishly eating his bread –
Stiff with the freezing cold; emerging from the froth,
Clung to by piles of seaweed,
May he lie like a dog face-down on chattering teeth,
Laid low by his feebleness,
Sprawled at the breakers' edge, still licked at by the surf!
These are the things I must see,
Because he wronged me, trampling all over our oaths,
Once a companion of mine!

The language is vigorous and direct, appropriate to the mood of the piece. Some of the diction is borrowed from the older work of Homer but it adds dignity and pathos without any artificiality. Meanings flow clearly and naturally with the simple meter, except in one place – the parenthesis set off with en dashes – where emotions get ahead of the poet's control as he anticipates years of suffering for his former friend. Images seem to tumble from his excited mind but nothing is superfluous and his control of the material is shown for example in his use of irony when referring to the great kindness of the savage Thracians, their hair neatly dressed, in contrast to his nude friend. His skill as a wordsmith can be seen in the way he loads the beginnings of lines with key words, a trend he overturns in the final couplet, with a caesura, marked by a comma, between key words justifying his hatred, μ᾽ ἠδίκησε, λὰξ ("wronged me, trampling").

One of the uncertainties in the text comes in the word ἐπέχοι, which indicates that the seaweed has a hold on the castaway. Some scholars prefer to read ἐπιχέοι, indicating that he spews out seaweed. (Note: The variant reading is cited for instance by D. Gerber, Greek Iambic Poetry, 438) Scholars often contrast the poem's realism with the artificiality of Horace's Epode 10, but not all scholars are willing to go along with this view, citing the Homeric diction as a literary device and the absence of proof that the oath-breaker was ever a real man rather than just a scapegoat or imaginary exemplar. Yet the poet has made the context seem real.

In this poem fierce hatred mingled with contempt finds a powerful voice, and yet, with so much passion, every phrase and every sentence is kept strictly under the control of a masterly mind. The impact on the ear, on the eye, and on the sense of smell is strong throughout. Every detail, the surf, the seaweed, the dog, the wretched man's frozen body, is there, life-like, or rather in even sharper outlines than they would appear to us in actual life.

— E. Fraenkel.

== Extras ==
- In his famous speech On the Crown, the great Athenian rhetor, Demosthenes, denounced his rival Aeschines with the neologism ἰαμβειοφάγος, signifying an iambus devourer or devourer of insults.

== See also ==
- Prosody (Latin)
- Epodes (Horace)
- Epode
- Category:Iambic poets
