= Dactylic metre =

Dactylic metre is any meter primarily composed of dactyls (long-short-short, or stressed-unstressed-unstressed). It may refer to:

- Dactylic tetrameter
- Dactylic pentameter
- Dactylic hexameter
- Double dactyl
