= Neobule =

Neobule (Ancient Greek: Νεοβούλη, Neoboúlē, lit. "New Decision" or "Ms. Fickle") was a girl addressed in the 7th-century BC Greek poetry of Archilochus. Archilochus claims to have been engaged to the girl (fl. c. 660 BC) before her father Lycambes ("Mr. Wolfy") reneged and married her to someone else. Archilochus's verses on the topic were so bitter that Neobule, her father, and her sisters were said to have all hanged themselves. These poems are generally agreed to be the origins of satire. Some modern scholars believe that Lycambes, Neobule, and her sisters were not actually the poet's contemporaries but stock characters from the iambic tradition; others hold that they are merely meaningful names applied to the figures from Archilochus's life.

In an elegy by Dioscorides, the victims are imagined to speak from the grave: "We here, the daughters of Lycambes who gained a hateful reputation, swear by the reverence in which this tomb of the dead is held that we did not shame our virginity or our parents or Paros, pre-eminent among holy islands, but Archilochus spewed forth frightful reproach and a hateful report against our family. We swear by the gods and spirits that we did not set eyes on Archilochus either in the streets or in Hera's great precinct. If we had been lustful and wicked, he would have not wanted to beget legitimate children from us."
