= Epodes (Horace) =

Collection of poems by Horace

- by Horace
- A 1901 edition of the Epodes by C. L. Smith
- Original title: Epodi; Epodon liber Iambi
- Written: c. 42–30 BC
- Language: Latin
- Genre(s): iambus, invective
- Publication date: 30 BC
- Metre: various iambic metres

The Epodes (Latin: Epodi or Epodon liber; also called Iambi) are a collection of iambic poems written by the Roman poet Horace. They were published in 30 BC and form part of his early work alongside the Satires. Following the model of the Greek poets Archilochus and Hipponax, the Epodes largely fall into the genre of blame poetry, which seeks to discredit and humiliate its targets.

The 17 poems of the Epodes cover a variety of topics, including politics, magic, eroticism and food. A product of the turbulent final years of the Roman Republic, the collection is known for its striking depiction of Rome's socio-political ills in a time of great upheaval. Due to their recurring coarseness and explicit treatment of sexuality, the Epodes have traditionally been Horace's least regarded work. However, the last quarter of the 20th century saw a resurgence in scholarly interest in the collection.

== Names ==
The modern standard name for the collection is Epodes. Deriving from the Greek epodos stichos ('verse in reply'), the term refers to a poetic verse following on from a slightly longer one. Since all poems except Epode 17 are composed in such an epodic form, the term is used with some justification. This naming convention, however, is not attested before the commentary of Pomponius Porphyrion in the second century AD. Horace himself referred to his poems as iambi on several occasions, but it is uncertain if this was intended as a title or only as a generic descriptor, referring to the dominant metre used in the collection: the iamb. In the ancient tradition of associating metrical form with content, the term had by Horace's time become a metonym for the genre of blame poetry which was habitually written in iambic metre. Both terms, Epodes and Iambi, have become common names for the collection.

== Date ==
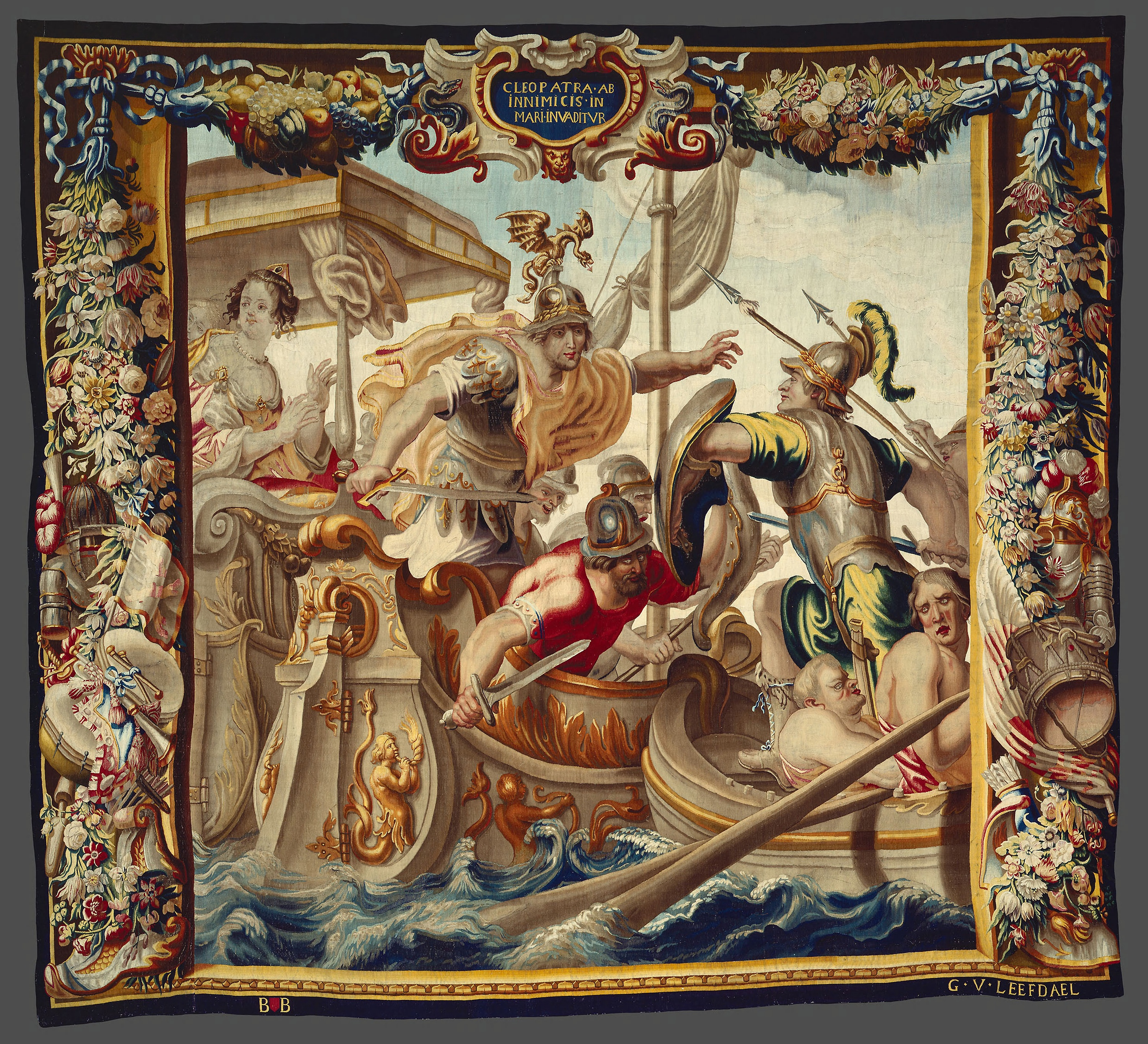
The dramatic date of the Epodes is around the Battle of Actium, here imagined by Justus van Egmont.

Horace began writing his Epodes after the Battle of Philippi in 42 BC. He had fought as a military tribune in the losing army of Caesar's assassins and his fatherly estate was confiscated in the aftermath of the battle. Having been pardoned by Octavian, Horace began to write poetry in this period. His budding relationship with the wealthy Gaius Maecenas features in several poems, which locates most of the work on the Epodes in the 30s BC. The finished collection was published in 30 BC.

The dramatic date of the collection is less certain. Two poems (Epodes 1 and 9) are explicitly and respectively set before and after the Battle of Actium (31 BC). The remaining poems cannot be placed with any certainty. However, it emerges that they are all set in the tumultuous decade between the death of Caesar and Octavian's final victory. As such, the Epodes are considered a crucial witness to Rome's violent transition from a republic to an autocratic monarchy.

== The iambic genre ==
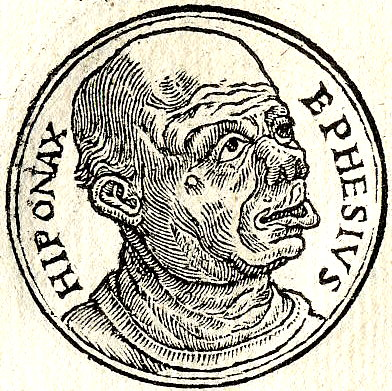
The archaic poet Hipponax was a major influence on Horace's Epodes. The image shows him as imagined by the 16th-century humanist Guillaume Rouillé.

The Epodes situate themselves in the tradition of iambic poetry going back to the lyric poets of archaic Greece. In the following quotation from his Epistles, Horace identifies the poet Archilochus of Paros as his most important influence:

I was the first to show to Latium the iambics of Paros, following the rhythms and spirit of Archilochus
not the themes or the words that hounded Lycambes. — Epistles 1.19.23–5

Dating to the seventh century BC, the poems of Archilochus contain attacks, often highly sexualised and scatological, on other members of society. Two groups in particular are targets of his abuse: personal enemies and promiscuous women. The above-mentioned Lycambes features in many of Archilochus' poems and was thought to have killed himself after being viciously slandered by the poet. Horace, as is indicated in the above passage, largely followed the model of Archilochus with regards to metre and spirit, but, on the whole, the Epodes are much more restrained in their verbal violence. While Horace does not borrow extensively from him, Archilochian influence can be felt in some of his themes (e.g. Epod. 8 and 12 as a variation on the Cologne Epodes) and poetic stances (e.g. addressing fellow citizens or hated enemies).

Another significant iambic predecessor of Horace was Hipponax, a lyric poet who flourished during the sixth century BC in Ephesus, Asia Minor. Writing in the same vein as Archilochus, his poems depict the vulgar aspects of contemporary society. In contrast to the previous iambic tradition, he has been described as striking a discernibly satirical pose: through the use of eccentric and foreign language, many of his poems come across as humorous takes on low-brow activities. His influence is acknowledged in Epode 6.11–4. The Hellenistic scholar and poet Callimachus (third century BC) also wrote a collection of iambi, which are thought to have left a mark on Horace's poems. In these poems, Callimachus presented a toned-down, less aggressive version of the archaic iambus. Horace avoids direct allusions to Callimachus, a fact which has sometimes been seen as a strategy in favour of the style of Archilochus and Hipponax.

== Metre ==
The metrical pattern of Epodes 1–10 consists of an iambic trimeter (three sets of two iambs) followed by an iambic dimeter (two sets of two iambs). Possible caesurae are indicated by a vertical line. In the trimeter, all longs (—) before the caesura may be replaced by two shorts (∪ ∪) by resolution (meter). In the dimeter, only the first long may be so replaced. Sometimes, for special effects (e.g. 2.35), even an anceps element may be resolved into two short syllables.

  x — ∪ — x | — ∪ | — x — ∪ — 
  x — ∪ — x — ∪ —

Poems 11–17 deviate from this pattern and, with the exception of 14 and 15, each exhibit a different metre. Most of these metres combine iambic elements with dactylic ones and include: the second and third Archilochian, the Alcmanian (or Alcmanic) strophe, and the first and second Pythiambic. Epode 17 presents an anomaly: it is the only poem in the collection with a stichic metre. The term 'stichic' denotes a succession of identical verses. In this case, the poem consists of eighty-one identical iambic trimeters. Therefore, 17 is the only Epode that may not technically be described as an epode.

== Contents ==
Epode 1 is dedicated to Horace's patron, Maecenas, who is about to join Octavian on the Actium campaign. The poet announces that he is willing to share the dangers of his influential friend, even though he is unwarlike himself. This loyalty, the poem claims, is not motivated by greed but rather by genuine friendship for Maecenas.

Epode 2 is a poem of exceptional length (70 verses) and popularity among readers of Horace. It envisions the tranquil life of a farmer as a desirable contrast to the hectic life of Rome's urban elite. Each season holds its own pleasures and life is dictated by the agricultural calendar. At the end of the poem, a money-lender named Alfius is revealed as the speaker of the epode, leaving the reader to ponder its sincerity.

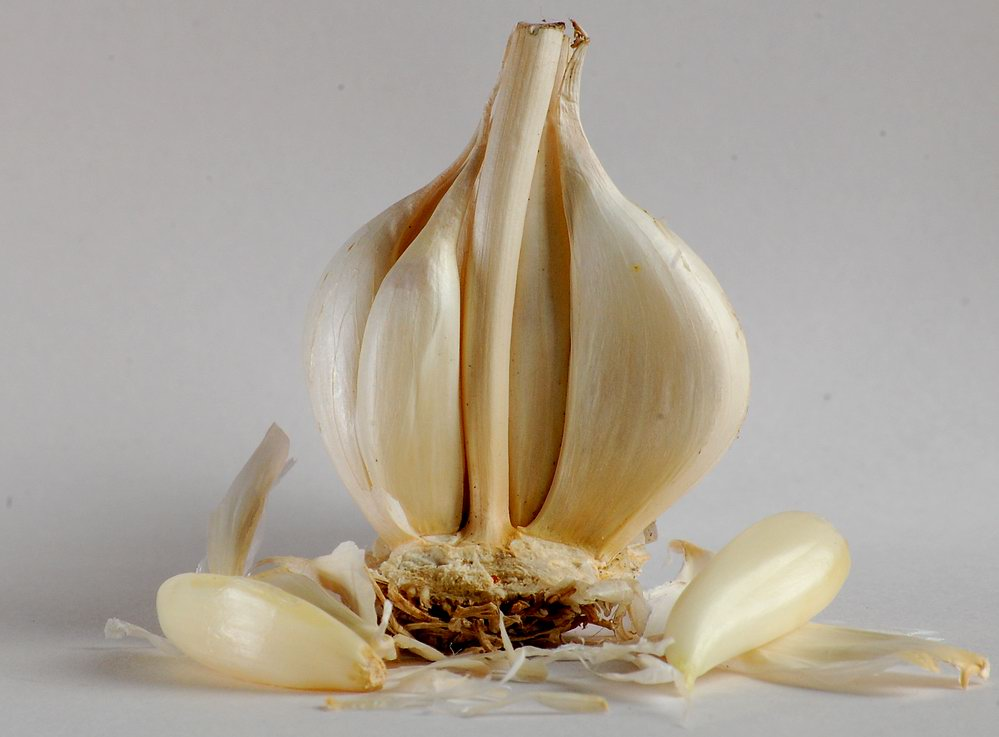
Epode 3 comments on the digestive effects of garlic.

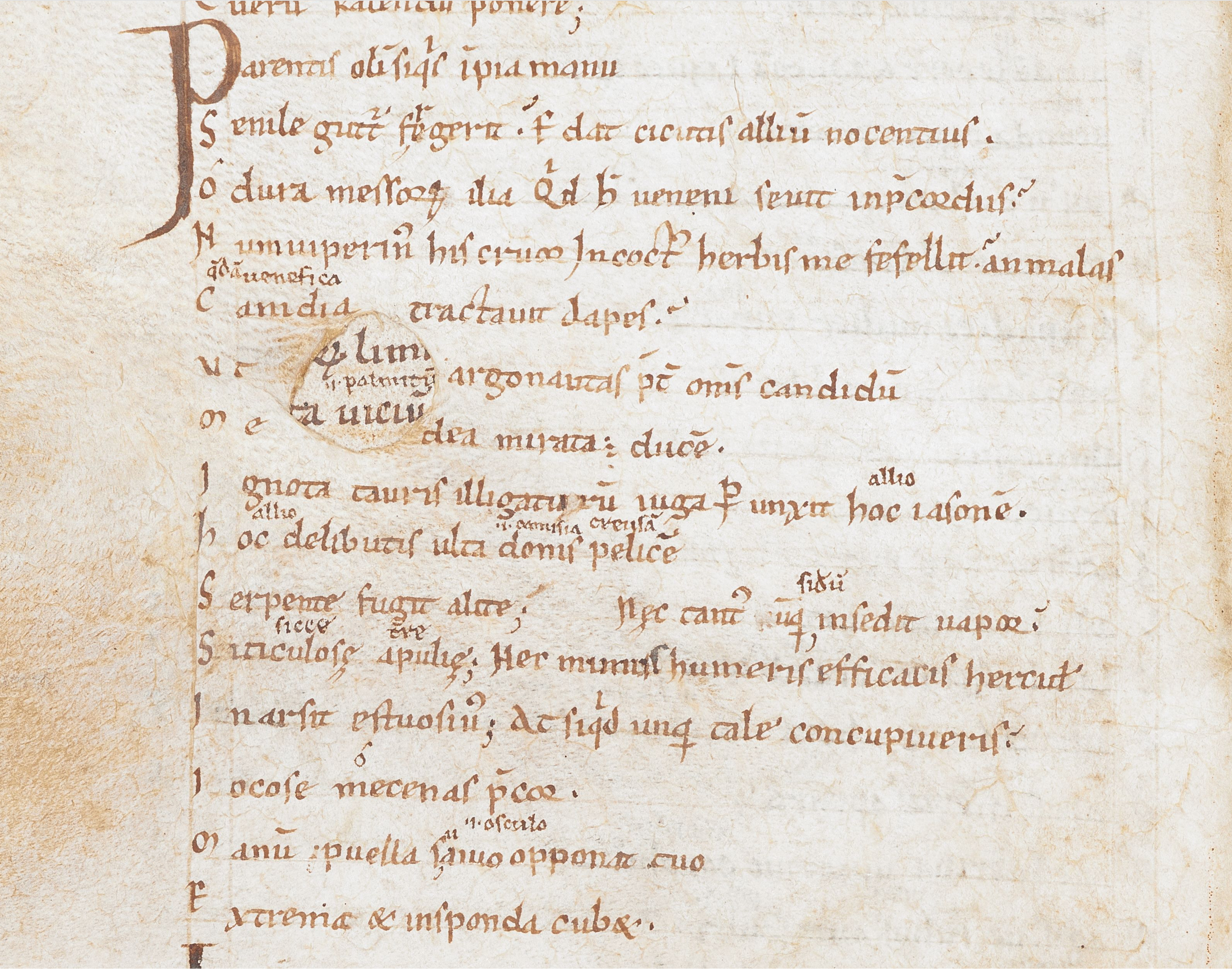
Epode 3 in a twelfth-century French manuscript of Horace's complete works in the British Library; allium or garlic is the penultimate word of the second line, written with a scribal abbreviation; the names Canidia and Medea may be read near the small hole, which must predate the use of this leaf, since the text itself is not lacunose; the folio beneath is visible through the gap (Harley MS 3534 f.39v)

In Epode 3, Horace reacts to an excessive amount of garlic he has consumed at one of Maecenas' dinner parties: its strong taste has set his stomach on fire. Comparing the ingredient to the poison used by witches such as Medea, he playfully wishes that his host be stricken by bad breath when with his girlfriend.

Epode 4 criticises the pretentious behaviour of a social climber. The main charge levelled at the man is that he used to be a slave and has now risen to be a military tribune, thereby offending those who traditionally occupied such positions. The poem also imagines the heckling of passers-by on the Via Sacra. Critics have stated that the target of the epode resembles Horace's own biography.

Epode 5 details the encounter of a young boy with the witch (venefica) Canidia. Together with a group of fellow witches, she plans to bury him alive up to his chin and to use his bone marrow and liver to concoct a love potion. Unable to escape from his entrapment, the boy utters a vow to haunt the witches in his afterlife. The poem is the longest in the collection and is particularly notable for its portrayal of witchcraft.

In Epode 6, Horace envisions himself as the successor of the Greek iambographers Archilochus and Hipponax. Should someone be brave enough to provoke him, he will bite back with the fervour of his Greek models.

Epode 7 is addressed to the citizens of Rome. Set in the context of Octavian's civil war, the poet scolds his fellow citizens for rushing to shed their own blood instead of fighting foreign enemies. The poem and its opening line (Quo, quo scelesti ruitis? "Where, where are you rushing in your wickedness?") are famous for their desperate attempt to prevent renewed civil warfare.

Epode 8 is the first of two 'sexual epodes'. In it, Horace lambasts a repulsive old woman for expecting sexual favours from him. Although she is wealthy and has a collection of sophisticated books, the poet rejects her ageing body. It has been argued that in this poem and in Epode 12, Horace is allegorically attacking the ugly over-embellished style of some earlier literature.

Epode 9 extends an invitation to Maecenas to celebrate Octavian's victory in the Battle of Actium of 31 BC. Octavian is praised for having defeated Mark Antony, who is portrayed as an unmanly leader because of his alliance with Cleopatra.

Epode 10 strikes a more traditionally iambic note. In the style of Hipponax's Strasbourg Epode, the poet curses his enemy Mevius. Horace wishes that the ship carrying Mevius will suffer shipwreck and that his enemy's corpse will be devoured by gulls.

In Epode 11, the poet complains to his friend Pettius that he longer enjoys writing verses as he is mad with love for a boy named Lyciscus. The poem is a variation on the idea that love may make the lover's life unbearable. It thus has much in common with Roman love elegy.

Epode 12 is the second of two 'sexual epodes'. In the first half the speaker is a youth who complains about an older woman who pesters him to have sex with her, but her unattractiveness makes it difficult for him to perform. In the second half he quotes the woman's complaint about him.

Epode 13 is set at a symposium, an all-male drinking party. Drinking with one's friends and listening to music is presented as an antidote to both bad weather and worries. The second half of the poem tells how the centaur Chiron gave the same piece of advice to his pupil Achilles before he set off for Troy.

Epode 14 returns to the theme of poem 11: the inhibiting effects of love. Horace apologises to Maecenas for not having completed as promised a set of iambics. The reason for this failure, he adds, is that he has fallen in love, this time with a courtesan called Phryne. He hints that Maecenas himself is also burning with love and he encourages him to enjoy the beauty of his beloved.

Epode 15 continues the motif of love by commenting on the infidelity of one Neaera. Having sworn an oath of loyalty to the poet, she has now run off to another wealthier rival. The poem contains a well-known pun on Horace's cognomen Flaccus (nam si quid in Flacco viri est "... if there is anything manly in a man called floppy").

Epode 16 weaves together strands from Epodes 2 and 7. After lamenting the devastating effects of civil warfare on Rome and its citizens, Horace exhorts his countrymen to emigrate to a faraway place. This vision of a rural lifestyle as an alternative to a depressed state of affairs shows characteristics of escapism.

The final Epode 17 takes the shape of a palinode, a type of poem which serves to retract a previously stated sentiment. Here, the poet declares he has suffered enough and takes back his defamations of Canidia in poem 5. He begs the witch for mercy. His request is shrugged off by Canidia who thus has the last word of the collection.

== Themes ==
Victimhood is an import theme within the collection. Although Horace assumes the strident persona of the iambic poet for most of the Epodes, critics have described that the roles of aggressor and victim are regularly reversed. In the two erotic poems (8 and 12), for example, the poet is forced to retaliate viciously because his sexual potency has been called into question. Similarly, his toothless tirade against the use of garlic comes after the poet has been poisoned by the same ingredient.

Central to discussions of victimhood in the Epodes is Horace's fascination with the witch Canidia and her coven. She features prominently in two poems (5 and 17) which together make up nearly a third of the collection. The Latinist Ellen Oliensis describes her as a "kind of anti-Muse": Horace finds himself forced to write poems in order to assuage her anger. In keeping with the overall depiction of women in the collection, the witch is reduced to her repulsive sexuality which the poet is nevertheless unable to resist. This weakness in the face of Canidia is illustrated by the fact that she speaks the last word of the Epodes. Features such as these have made the Epodes a popular case study for the exploration of poetic impotence.

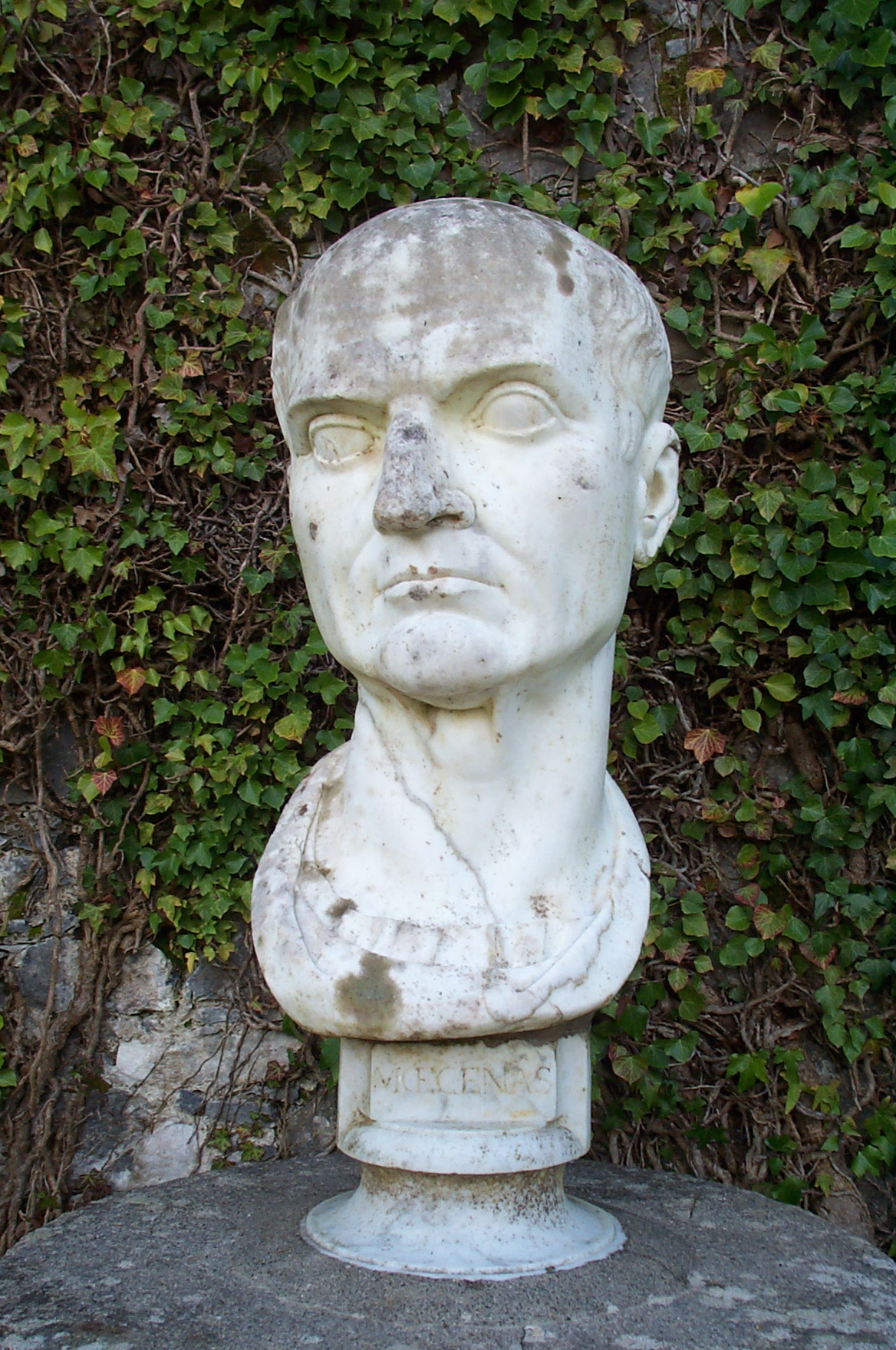
Horace's friendship with the wealthy Maecenas is a recurring theme of the Epodes. This bust of Maecenas located in Coole Park, County Galway is possibly from the 17th or 18th century.

The dramatic situation of the Epodes is set against the backdrop of Octavian's civil war against Mark Antony. Anxiety about the outcome of the conflict manifests itself in several poems: while Epodes 1 and 9 express support for the Octavian cause, 9 displays a frustration about the precarious political situation more generally. The wish to escape to a simpler, less hostile environment comes to the fore in two lengthy poems (2 and 16) and strikes a tone much like that of Virgil's early work, the Eclogues and Georgics. One result of decades of civil war is the increasing confusion of friend and foe, which can be seen in Horace's attacks on Maecenas (3) and the upstart military tribune (4).

Palpable throughout much of the Epodes is a concern for the poet's standing in society already familiar to readers of the Satires. In this regard, Horace's friendship with the wealthy Maecenas is of particular interest. Horace, the son of an ex-slave, seems to have felt some uncertainty about their cross-class relationship. A good example of this is Epode 3: in response to an overly garlicky dinner, Horace hopes that Maecenas will suffer from a similar garlic overdose. The humorous curse against his social superior has been interpreted as the poet standing his ground in a socially acceptable way. The opposite dynamic can be observed in Epode 4. Here, the poet, apparently oblivious of his low social status, joins a mob of citizens in ridiculing a former slave who has risen to become a Roman knight.

== Reception ==
The Epodes have traditionally been Horace's least regarded work, due, in part, to the collection's recurring coarseness and its open treatment of sexuality. This has caused critics to strongly favour the political poems (1, 7, 9, and 16), while the remaining ones became marginalised. Leaving few traces in later ancient texts, the Epodes were often treated as a lesser appendix to the famous Odes in the early modern period. Only the second Epode, an idyllic vision of rural life, received regular attention by publishers and translators. Nevertheless, during the Victorian era, a number of leading English boarding schools prescribed parts of the collection as set texts for their students. The last quarter of the 20th century saw a resurgence of critical interest in the Epodes, bringing with it the publication of several commentaries and scholarly articles. In the wake of this resurgence, the collection has become known for what the classicist Stephen Harrison describes as "hard-hitting analyses" of the socio-political issues of late-Republican Rome.

One feature that has proved of enduring interest is the collection's eccentric portrayal of witchcraft. Examples of this include a hostile review of Uncle Tom's Cabin published in the Southern Literary Messenger in 1852. The anonymous reviewer criticised the book's educational message, describing it as "the song of Canidia."

== Selected editions ==
- Law, Andy (2024). A Translation and Interpretation of Horace’s Iambi. Cambridge Scholars Publishing. ISBN 978-1036400279. Latin text with translation and interpretation.
- Mankin, David (1995). Horace: Epodes. Cambridge: Cambridge University Press. ISBN 978-0521397742. Latin text with a commentary and introduction.
- Rudd, Niall (2004). Odes and Epodes. Cambridge, MA: Harvard University Press. ISBN 978-0674996090. Latin text with a facing English prose translation.
- Shackleton Bailey, D. R. (2001). Horatius, Opera (in Latin). Berlin and New York: De Gruyter. ISBN 978-3-11-020292-2. Critical edition of Horace's collected works, in Latin with a critical apparatus.
- Shepherd, W. G. (1983). The Complete Odes and Epodes. London: Penguin Classics. ISBN 978-0-14-044422-3. English verse translation.
- Watson, Lindsay (2003). A Commentary on Horace's Epodes. Oxford: Oxford University Press. ISBN 978-0199253241. Latin text with a commentary and introduction.
- West, David (2008). Horace: The Complete Odes and Epodes. Oxford: Oxford University Press. ISBN 9780192839428. English prose translation.

== Works cited ==
- Albrecht, Michael von (1994). Geschichte der römischen Literatur. Teil 1 (in German). Boston and Berlin. doi:10.1515/9783111563794. ISBN 978-3-11-119254-3. (subscription required)
- Bather, Philippa; Stocks, Clare (2016). "Horace's Epodes". In Bather, Philippa; Stocks, Clare (eds.). Horace's Epodes: Contexts, Intertexts, and Reception. Oxford. pp. 2–29. doi:10.1093/acprof:oso/9780198746058.001.0001. ISBN 978-0-19-874605-8. (subscription required)
- Barchiesi, Alessandro (2001). "Horace and Iambos: The Poet as Literary Historian". In Cavarzere, Alberto; Aloni, Antonio; Barchiesi, Alessandro (eds.). Iambic Ideas: Essays on a Poetic Tradition from Archaic Greece to the Late Roman Empire. Lanham, MD. pp. 141–64. ISBN 9780742508170.
- Cairns, Francis (1978). "The genre Palinode and Three Horatian Examples: Epode 17; Odes I, 16, Odes I, 34". L'Antiquité Classique. 47 (2): 546–52. doi:10.3406/antiq.1978.1916. ISSN 0770-2817. JSTOR 41651332.
- Clayman, D. L. (1975). "Horace's Epodes VIII and XII: More than Clever Obscenity?". The Classical World, 69(1), 55–61.
- Fairclough, H. R. (1926). Horace. Satires, Epistles, Art of Poetry. Cambridge, MA. ISBN 9780674992146. (subscription required)
- Fitzgerald, William (1988). "Power and Impotence in Horace's Epodes". Ramus. 17 (2): 176–91. doi:10.1017/S0048671X00003143. S2CID 191884035. (subscription required)
- Harrison, Stephen J. (2019). "Horace (Horatius Flaccus, Quintus), Roman poet, 65–8 BCE". In Whitmarsh, Timothy G. (ed.). Oxford Classical Dictionary Online. Oxford. doi:10.1093/acrefore/9780199381135.013.3150. ISBN 978-0-19-938113-5. (subscription required)
- Henderson, John (1999). "Horace talks rough and dirty: no comment (Epodes 8 & 12)". Scholia. 8 (1): 3–16. (subscription required)
- Luck, Georg (1976). "An Interpretation of Horace's Eleventh Epode". Illinois Classical Studies. 1: 122–6. JSTOR 23061872. (registration required)
- Mankin, David (1995). Horace. Epodes. Cambridge.
- Mankin, David (2010). "The Epodes: Genre, Themes, and Arrangement". In Davis, Gregson (ed.). A Companion to Horace. Chichester. pp. 91–104.
- Mountford, Peter (2019). Maecenas. London and New York: Routledge. ISBN 978-0-367-13747-2.
- Oliensis, Ellen (1991). "Canidia, Canicula, and the Decorum of Horace's Epodes". Arethusa. 24 (1): 107–38. JSTOR 26309415. (registration required)
- Oliensis, Ellen (2016). "Scenes from the Afterlife of Horace's Epodes (c.1600–1900)". In Bather, Philippa; Stocks, Clare (eds.). Horace's Epodes: Contexts, Intertexts and Reception. Oxford. pp. 220–41. doi:10.1093/acprof:oso/9780198746058.003.0010. ISBN 978-0-19-874605-8. (subscription required)
- Schmitzer, Ulrich (1994). "Von Wölfen und Lämmern (Hor. Epod. 4)". In Koster, Severin (ed.). Horaz-Studien (in German). Erlangen. pp. 31–50.
- Rudd, Niall (2004). Horace. Odes and Epodes. Cambridge, MA. doi:10.4159/DLCL.horace-epodes.2004. (subscription required)
- Watson, Lindsay (2003). Watson, Lindsay C (ed.). A Commentary on Horace's Epodes. Oxford. doi:10.1093/actrade/9780199253241.book.1. ISBN 978-0-19-925324-1. (subscription required)
- Watson, Lindsay (2007). "The Epodes: Horace's Archilochus?". In Harrison, Stephen J. (ed.). The Cambridge Companion to Horace. Cambridge. pp. 93–104. doi:10.1017/CCOL0521830028.008. ISBN 9780521830027. (subscription required)
- West, Martin L. (1993). Greek Lyric Poetry. Oxford.
