= Archermus =

Archermus (Ancient Greek: Άρχερμος) was a sculptor of Chios working in the middle of the 6th century BC. His father, Micciades, and his sons, Bupalus and Athenis, were sculptors of marble.

A scholium on Aristophanes' Birds, credits Archermus with having been the first to represent Nike and Eros with wings. A running archaic Nike figure that was found at Delos in 1877 (Tarbell), was at first too hopefully connected with a separate base found nearby, which recorded the execution of a statue by Archermus and Micciades; at first it was dubbed the "Nike of Archermus". Unfortunately it is the base, which probably supported a sphinx, that alone is by Archermus and his father.

The Museum of Classical Archaeology, Cambridge, classify their cast of the Nike as:

Nike of Delos. Marble, 0.90 m. Winged female figure, either a freestanding sculpture or an akroterion (roof ornament). Possibly by Archermos. 570-560 BC. From the Temple of Artemis at Delos. (Athens NM 21).
