= Alcmanian verse =

Greek and Latin poetic verse form

Alcmanian verse refers to the dactylic tetrameter in Greek and Latin poetry.

== Dactylic tetrameter in Alcman ==
Ancient metricians called the dactylic tetrameter the Alcmanic because of its use by the Archaic Greek poet Alcman, as in fragment 27 PMG:

Μῶσ᾽ ἄγε Καλλιόπα θύγατερ Διὸς
ἄρχ᾽ ἐρατῶν ϝεπέων, ἐπὶ δ᾽ ἵμερον
ὕμνωι καὶ χαρίεντα τίθη χορόν.

| – uu – uu – uu – uu |
| – uu – uu – uu – uu |
| – – – uu – uu – uu |

'Come, Muse Calliope, daughter of Zeus,
Begin the lovely words, add beauty
And lovely dance to our hymn.'

This length is scanned like the first four feet of the dactylic hexameter (giving rise to the name dactylic tetrameter a priore). Thus, a spondee substitutes for a dactyl in the third line, but the lines end with dactyls (not spondees).

The final syllable of each line in the above fragment counts as short and brevis in longo is not observed.

== The Alcmanian (or Alcmanic) strophe ==
Horace composed some poems in the Alcmanian strophe or Alcmanian system. It is also called the Alcmanic strophe or the 1st Archilochian. It is a couplet consisting of a dactylic hexameter followed by a dactylic tetrameter a posteriore (so called because it ends with a spondee, thus resembling the last four feet of the hexameter). Examples are Odes I.7 and I.28, and Epode 12:

Quid tibi vis, mulier nigris dignissima barris?
Munera quid mihi quidve tabellas

'What do you want for yourself, woman worthy of black elephants?
Why (do you send) me gifts and billets-doux?'

It is the only metre in Horace's Epodes not to contain any iambic metra, and the only one to be found in both the Epodes and Odes.

Later Latin poets use the dactylic tetrameter a priore as the second verse of the Alcmanian strophe. For example, Boethius' Consolation of Philosophy I.m.3:

Tunc me discussa liquerunt nocte tenebrae
Luminibusque prior rediit vigor.
Ut, cum praecipiti glomerantur nubila Coro
Nimbosisque polus stetit imbribus,
Sol latet ac nondum caelo venientibus astris,
Desuper in terram nox funditur;
Hanc si Threicio Boreas emissus ab antro
Verberet et clausum reseret diem,
Emicat et subito vibratus lumine Phoebus
Mirantes oculos radiis ferit.

'Then as the night was shaken off, the darkness became clear
and the former strength returned to my eyes.
Just as when clouds gather with a strong north-west wind
and the sky threatens with cloudy rainshowers,
The Sun is hidden and, the stars not yet coming to the sky,
night is poured from above onto the earth.
But if the North Wind, released from his Thracian cave,
were to beat the earth and unlock the closed up day,
Phoebus bursts out and gleaming with sudden light
strikes our amazed eyes with his rays.'

Ausonius uses couplets of a dactylic tetrameter a priore followed by a hemiepes in Parentalia 25:

Te quoque Dryadiam materteram
flebilibus modulis.

'You also, Dryadia my aunt,
with mournful strains...'

== In modern poetry ==
The term "Alcmanian" is sometimes applied to modern English dactylic tetrameters (e.g. Robert Southey's "Soldier's Wife": "Wild-visaged Wanderer, ah, for thy heavy chance!"), or to poems (e.g. in German) that strictly imitate Horace's meters.
