= Canidia gens =

Ancient Roman plebeian family

The gens Canidia was an obscure plebeian family at ancient Rome, first mentioned during the late Republic. It is best known from a single individual, Publius Canidius Crassus, consul suffectus in 40 BC, and the chief general of Marcus Antonius during the Perusine War. Other Canidii are known from inscriptions. The name Canidia was also used by Horace as a sobriquet for the perfumer, Gratidia.

== Origin ==
The nomen Canidius belongs to a common class of gentilicia formed from cognomina ending in -idus. It is derived from the cognomen Canidus, "whitish" or "greyish", itself derived from the Latin adjective canus or kanus, "white, grey", typically referring to the color of a person's hair, also sometimes used as a cognomen. This was certainly the association that Horace intended; the name Gratidia suggests pleasant, winsome attributes, while the nickname Canidia suggests an elderly crone.

== Members ==
This list includes abbreviated praenomina. For an explanation of this practice, see filiation.

- Publius Canidius, father of the consul Crassus.
- Publius Canidius P. f. Crassus, consul suffectus in 40 BC, he was one of the chief generals under Marcus Antonius, but fled after Perusia fell to Octavian.

=== From inscriptions ===
- Canidius, buried in Umbria with a monument from his mother, Veturia.
- Canidia Athenaïs, buried at Rome in the late first century, with a monument from her mother, Flavia Logas.
- Gaius Canidius Cerdo, together with Gaius Canidius Suavis, one of the patrons and former masters of Gaius Canidius Pantagathus.
- Lucius Canidius Euelpistus, an argentarius near the Temple of Castor at Rome; he was the client, and probably the freedman of Lucius Canidius Priscus.
- Canidius Fortunatus, a veteran of the Third Legion, buried at Lambaesis in Numidia, aged fifty-seven, with a monument from his wife, Geminia Manica.
- Gaius Canidius Fundanus, known from a sepulchral inscription from Lusitania.
- Canidia Marcellina, buried at Aquileia in Venetia and Histria, with a monument from her grandson, Aelius Constans.
- Canidia Marcianis, together with Marcus Canidius Nicephorus and Julia Marcianis, dedicated a monument at Rome to Marcus' wife, Canidia Phaedra.
- Canidia C. l. Musa, a freedwoman named in an inscription from Rome.
- Marcus Canidius Nicephorus, together with Canidia Marcianis and Julia Marcianis, dedicated a monument at Rome to his beloved wife, Canidia Phaedra.
- Gaius Canidius C. C. l. Pantagathus, the freedman and client of Gaius Canidius Cerdo and Gaius Canidius Suavis.
- Canidia Phaedra, buried at Rome with a monument from her husband, Marcus Canidius Nicephorus, Canidia Marcianis, and Julia Marcianis.
- Publius Canidius Primus, buried at Rome during the second century, with a monument dedicated by the freedman Publius Vettius Chrysanthus.
- Lucius Canidius Priscus, the patron, and perhaps former master of the freedman and argentarius Lucius Canidius Euelpistus.
- Gaius Canidius Suavis, together with Gaius Canidius Cerdo, one of the patrons and former masters of Gaius Canidius Pantagathus.

== Horace's Canidia ==
The "Canidia" mentioned by Horace in his fifth and seventeenth epodes, and in the eighth satire in his first book of satires, and perhaps alluded to in the sixteenth ode of his first volume of Palinodia, was actually named "Gratidia"; the scholiasts describe her as a Neapolitan hetaira who had deserted the poet. Horace bestowed the ironic nickname upon her, and portrayed her as a sorceress, who used magic perfumes to enchant her lover, Varus. Maxwell Paule cautions against reading Horace's description literally; his portrayal was that of the anti-muse, who torments rather than inspires the artist.

== See also ==
- List of Roman gentes

== Bibliography ==
- Quintus Horatius Flaccus (Horace), Epodes, Satirae (Satires).
- Dictionary of Greek and Roman Biography and Mythology, William Smith, ed., Little, Brown and Company, Boston (1849).
- Theodor Mommsen et alii, Corpus Inscriptionum Latinarum (The Body of Latin Inscriptions, abbreviated CIL), Berlin-Brandenburgische Akademie der Wissenschaften (1853–present).
- René Cagnat et alii, L'Année épigraphique (The Year in Epigraphy, abbreviated AE), Presses Universitaires de France (1888–present).
- George Davis Chase, "The Origin of Roman Praenomina", in Harvard Studies in Classical Philology, vol. VIII, pp. 103–184 (1897).
- T. Robert S. Broughton, The Magistrates of the Roman Republic, American Philological Association (1952–1986).
- Maxwell Teitel Paule, Canidia, Rome's First Witch, Bloomsbury Academic (2017), ISBN 9781350003897.
- Lilah Grace Canevaro, Review of Canidia, Rome's First Witch, Classics for All (2017).
- Britta Ager, "Magic Perfumes and Deadly Herbs: The Scent of Witches' Magic in Classical Literature", in Preternature: Critical and Historical Studies on the Preternatural (2019), pp. 1–34.
