= Dactylic tetrameter =

Poetic verse form

Metrical feet and accents
Disyllables
- ◡ ◡: pyrrhic, dibrach
- ◡ –: iamb
  - ◡: trochee, choree
- –: spondee

Trisyllables
- ◡ ◡ ◡: tribrach
  - ◡ ◡: dactyl
- ◡ – ◡: amphibrach
- ◡ ◡ –: anapaest, antidactylus
- ◡ – –: bacchius
  - ◡ –: cretic, amphimacer
  - – ◡: antibacchius
- – –: molossus
- See main article for tetrasyllables.

Dactylic tetrameter is a metre in poetry. It refers to a line consisting of four dactylic feet. "Tetrameter" simply means four poetic feet. Each foot has a stressed syllable followed by two unstressed syllables, the opposite of an anapest, sometimes called antidactylus to reflect this fact.

== Example ==
A dactylic foot is one stressed syllable followed by two unstressed ones:

DUM	da	da

A dactylic tetrameter would therefore be:

DUM	da	da	DUM	da	da	DUM	da	da	DUM	da	da

Scanning this using an "x" to represent an unstressed syllable and a "/" to represent a stressed syllable would make a dactylic tetrameter like the following:

/	x	x	/	x	x	/	x	x	/	x	x

The following lines from The Beatles' "Lucy in the Sky with Diamonds" demonstrate this, the scansion being:

/	x	x	/	x	x	/	x	x	/	x	x
Pic-	ture	your-	self	in	a	boat	on	a	riv-	er	with

/	x	x	/	x	x	/	x	x	/	x	x
tan-	ger-	ine	tree-	ees	and	marm-	a-	lade	skii-	ii-	es

Another example, from Browning:

/	x	x	/	x	x	/	x	x	/	x
Just	for	a	hand-	ful	of	sil-	ver	he	left	us!

Another example from Leonard Cohen of his song "Famous Blue Raincoat":

/	x	x	/	x	x	/	x	x	/	x
What	can	I	tell	you	my	bro-	ther	my	kee-	per

/	x	x	/	x	x	/
What	can	I	poss-	ib-	ly	say

== See also ==
- Dactyl (poetry)
- Tetrameter
- Alcmanian verse, for the dactylic tetrameter in Greek and Latin poetry
