= Bupalus and Athenis =

6th century sibling sculptors

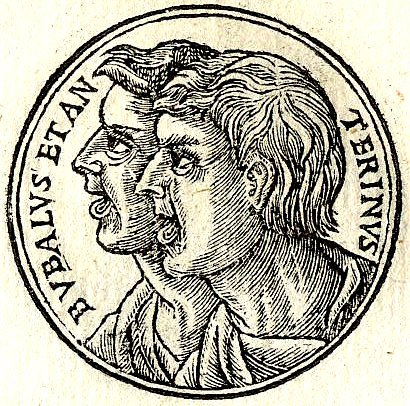
Bupalus and Athenis from Promptuarii Iconum Insigniorum

Bupalus (Greek: Βούπαλος) and Athenis (Greek: Ἄθηνις), were sons of Archermus, and members of the celebrated school of sculpture in marble which flourished in Chios in the 6th century BC. They were contemporaries of the poet Hipponax, whom they were said to have caricatured. Their works consisted almost entirely of draped female figures, Artemis, Fortune, The Graces, when the Chian school has been well called a school of Madonnas. Augustus brought many of the works of Bupalus and Athenis to Rome, and placed them on the gable of the temple of Apollo Palatinus. Bupalus supposedly committed suicide out of shame after Hipponax wrote caustic satirical poetry about him to revenge himself on Bupalus for his refusal to let Hipponax marry his daughter and for his caricature of Hipponax.

Aristophanes refers to Bupalus in the Lysistrata. When the Chorus of Men encounter the Chorus of Women near the north-western edge of the Acropolis they ridicule the women, "I warrant, now, if twice or thrice we slap their faces neatly, That they will learn, like Bupalus, to hold their tongues discreetly." (Benjamin Bickley Rogers translation)

It is now suggested that the north (and perhaps also the east) frieze of the Siphnian Treasury in Delphi was the work of Bupalus, based on a partially erased inscription around the circumference of one of the giant's shields, reconstructed as:

Ḅ[όπαλ]ο[ς Ἀρχέρμο̄? τά]δε καὶ τὄπισθεν ἐποίε

Boupalos son of Archermos made these (sculptures) and those behind.

== See also ==
- Ancient Greek sculpture
