= Hipponax =

Ancient Greek poet

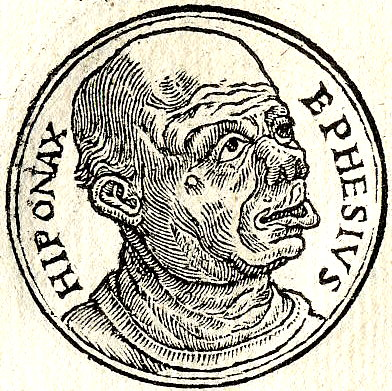
Hipponax from Guillaume Rouillé's Promptuarii Iconum Insigniorum (1553)

Hipponax (/ˈhɪpənæks/; Ancient Greek: Ἱππῶναξ; gen. Ἱππώνακτος; fl. late 6th century BCE), of Ephesus and later Clazomenae, was an Ancient Greek iambic poet who composed verses depicting the vulgar side of life in Ionian society. He was celebrated by ancient authors for his malicious wit, especially for his attacks on some contemporary sculptors, Bupalus and Athenis. Hipponax was reputed to be physically deformed, which might have been inspired by the nature of his poetry.

== Life ==
Ancient authorities record the barest details about his life (sometimes contradicting each other) and his extant poetry is too fragmentary to support autobiographical interpretation (a hazardous exercise even at the best of times).

The Marmor Parium, only partially preserved in the relevant place, dates him to 541/40 BCE, a date supported by Pliny the Elder in this comment on the theme of sculpture:

There lived in the island of Chios a sculptor Melas who was succeeded by his son Micciades and his grandson Achermus; the latter's sons, Bupalus and Athenis, had the very greatest fame in that art at the time of the poet Hipponax who was clearly alive in the 60th Olympiad (540–37).—Natural History 36.4.11

Archeological corroboration for these dates is found on the pedestal of a statue in Delos, inscribed with the names Micciades and Achermus and dated to 550–30 BCE. The poet therefore can be safely dated to the second half of the sixth century BC. According to Athenaeus, he was small, thin and surprisingly strong The Byzantine encyclopaedia Suda, recorded that he was expelled from Ephesus by the tyrants Athenagoras and Comas, then settled in Clazomenae, and that he wrote verses satirising Bupalus and Athenis because they made insulting likenesses of him. A scholiast commenting on Horace's Epodes recorded two differing accounts of the dispute with Bupalus, characterized however as "a painter in Clazomenae": Hipponax sought to marry Bupalus's daughter but was rejected because of his physical ugliness, and Bupalus portrayed him as ugly in order to provoke laughter. According to the same scholiast, Hipponax retaliated in verse so savagely that Bupalus hanged himself. Hipponax in that case closely resembles Archilochus of Paros, an earlier iambic poet, who reportedly drove a certain Lycambes and his daughters to hang themselves after he too was rejected in marriage. Such a coincidence invites scepticism. The comic poet Diphilus took the similarity between the two iambic poets even further, representing them as rival lovers of the poet Sappho.

The life of Hipponax, as revealed in the poems, resembles a low-life saga centred on his private enmities, his amorous escapades and his poverty but it is probable he was another Petronius, depicting low-life characters while actually moving in higher social circles. In one fragment, Hipponax decries "Bupalus, the mother-fucker (μητροκοίτης) with Arete", the latter evidently being the mother of Bupalus, yet Arete is presented as performing fellatio on Hipponax in another fragment and, elsewhere, Hipponax complains "Why did you go to bed with that rogue Bupalus?", again apparently referring to Arete (whose name ironically is Greek for 'virtue'). The poet is a man of action but, unlike Archilochus, who served as a warrior on Thasos, his battlefields are close to home:

Take my cloak, I'll hit Bupalus in the eye! For I have two right hands and I don't miss with my punches.

Hipponax's quarrelsome disposition is also illustrated in verses quoted by Tzetzes, where the bard abuses a painter called Mimnes, and advises him thus:

when you paint the serpent on the trireme's full-oared side, quit making it run back from the prow-ram to the pilot. What a disaster it will be and what a sensation—you low-born slave, you scum—if the snake should bite the pilot on the shin —fragment 28

== Work ==
Hipponax composed within the iambus tradition which, in the work of Archilochus, a hundred years earlier, appears to have functioned as ritualized abuse and obscenity associated with the religious cults of Demeter and Dionysus but which, in Hipponax's day, seems rather to have had the purpose of entertainment. In both cases, the genre featured scornful abuse, a bitter tone and sexual permissiveness. Unlike Archilochus, however, he frequently refers to himself by name, emerging as a highly self-conscious figure, and his poetry is more narrow and insistently vulgar in scope: "with Hipponax, we are in an unheroic, in fact, a very sordid world", amounting to "a new conception of the poet's function."

He was considered the inventor of a peculiar metre, the scazon ("halting iambic" as Murray calls it) or choliamb, which substitutes a spondee or trochee for the final iambus of an iambic senarius, and is an appropriate form for the burlesque character of his poems. As an ancient scholar once put it:

In his desire to abuse his enemies he shattered the meter, making it lame instead of straightforward, and unrhythmical, i.e. suitable for vigorous abuse, since what is rhythmical and pleasing to the ear would be more suitable for words of praise than blame. —Demetrius of Phalerum

Little of his work survives despite its interest to Alexandrian scholars, who collected it in two or three books. Most of the surviving fragments are in choliambs but others feature trochaic tetrameter and even dactyls, the latter sometimes in combination with iambs and even on their own in dactylic hexameter, imitating epic poetry. Ancient scholars in fact credited him with inventing parody and Athenaeus quoted this diatribe against a glutton 'Euromedontiades', composed in dactylic hexameter in mock-heroic imitation of Homer's Odyssey:

Muse, sing of Eurymedontiades, sea-swilling Charybdis,
his belly a sharp-slicing knife, his table manners atrocious;
sing how, condemned by public decree, he will perish obscenely
under a rain of stones, on the beach of the barren salt ocean''—fragment 128 (Note: 'Euromedontiades' means 'son of Euromedon', who was a king of giants mentioned by Homer (Odyssey 7.58f.); Charybdis is also mentioned by Homer (Odyssey 12.104); Aristotle named Hegemon of Thasos as the founder of parody (Poetics 1448a12) but he meant thereby that Hegemon was the first to make parody a profession—Douglas Gerber, Greek Iambic Poetry, Loeb Classical Library (1999), notes 4, 6, 8 page 459)

Most archaic poets (including the iambic poets Archilochus and Semonides) were influenced by the Ionian epic tradition, as represented in the work of Homer. Except for parody, Hipponax composed as if Homer never existed, avoiding not only heroic sentiment but even epic phrasing and vocabulary. He employed a form of Ionic Greek that included an unusually high proportion of Anatolian and particularly Lydian loanwords, as for example here where he addresses Zeus with the outlandish Lydian word for 'king' (nominative πάλμυς):

Ὦ Ζεῦ, πάτερ Ζεῦ, θεῶν Ὀλυμπίων πάλμυ,
τί μ᾽ οὐκ ἔδωκας χρυσόν...
Zeus, father Zeus, sultan of the Olympian gods,
why have you not given me gold...?—fragment 38

Eating, defecating and fornicating are frequent themes and often they are employed together, as in fragment 92, a tattered papyrus which narrates a sexual encounter in a malodorous privy, where a Lydian-speaking woman performs some esoteric and obscene rites on the narrator, including beating his genitals with a fig branch and inserting something up his anus, provoking incontinence and finally an attack by dung beetles—a wild scene that possibly inspired the 'Oenothea' episode in Petronius's Satyricon.

Hipponax remains a mystery. We have lost the matrix of these fascinating but puzzling fragments; ripped from their frame they leave us in doubt whether to take them seriously as autobiographical material (unlikely, but it has been done), as complete fiction (but there is no doubt that Bupalus and Athenis were real people), as part of a literary adaptation of some ritual of abuse (a komos or something similar), or as dramatic scripts for some abusive proto-comic performance. Whatever they were, they are a pungent reminder of the variety and vitality of archaic Greek literature and of how much we have lost." —B.M. Knox

The extant work also includes fragments of epodes (fr. 115–118) but the authorship is disputed by many modern scholars, who attribute them to Archilochus on various grounds, including for example the earlier poet's superior skill in invective and the fragments' resemblance to the tenth epode of Horace (an avowed imitator of Archilochus). Archilochus might also have been the source for an unusually beautiful line attributed to Hipponax (Note: The Hipponax fragment 119 might have been a contamination of the Archilochus fragments 118 (εἴ μοι γένοιτο χεῖρα Νεοβούλης θιγεῖν / Would that I might thus touch Neoboule on her hand) and 196a.6 (καλὴ τέρεινα παρθένος / a beautiful, tender maiden)—Douglas Gerber, Greek Iambic Poetry, Loeb Classical Library (1999), note 1 for fr. 119 page 159) (a line that has also been described "as clear, melodious and spare as a line of Sappho"):

εἴ μοι γένοιτο παρθένος καλή τε καὶ τέρεινα—fr. 119
If only I might have a maiden who is both beautiful and tender.

=== Influence ===
Hipponax influenced Alexandrian poets searching for alternative styles and uses of language, such as Callimachus and Herodas, and his colourful reputation as an acerbic, social critic also made him a popular subject for verse, as in this choliambic epigram by Theocritus:

Ὁ μουσοποιὸς ἐνθάδ᾽ ῾Ιππῶναξ κεῖται.
κεἰ μὲν πονηρός, μὴ ποτέρχευ τῷ τύμβῳ·
εἰ δ᾽ ἐσσὶ κρήγυός τε καὶ παρὰ χρηστῶν,
θαρσέων καθίζευ, κἢν θέλῃς ἀπόβριξον.

Here lies the poet Hipponax. If you are a scoundrel, do not approach the tomb; but if you are honest and from worthy stock, sit down in confidence and, if you like, fall asleep,

or in this 19th century rhyming translation by C.S.Calverley:

Tuneful Hipponax rests him here.
Let no base rascal venture near.
Ye who rank high in birth and mind
Sit down—and sleep, if so inclined.

Ancient literary critics credited him with inventing literary parody and "lame" poetic meters suitable for vigorous abuse, as well as with influencing comic dramatists such as Aristophanes. His witty, abusive style appears for example in this passage by Herodian, who was mainly interested in its linguistic aspects (many of the extant verses were preserved for us by lexicographers and grammarians interested in rare words):

τίς ὀμφαλητόμος σε τὸν διοπλῆγα
ἔψησε κἀπέλουσεν ἀσκαρίζοντα;

What navel-snipper wiped and washed you as you squirmed about, you crack-brained creature?

where 'navel-snipper' signifies a midwife.

=== Transmission and reception ===
Few fragments of his work survived through the Byzantine period despite his earlier popularity with Alexandrian poets and scholars. The Christian fathers disapproved of his abusive and obscene verses and he was also singled out as unedifying by Julian the Apostate, the pagan emperor, who instructed his priests to "abstain not only from impure and lascivious acts but also from speech and reading of the same character...No initiate shall read Archilochus or Hipponax or any of the authors who write the same kind of thing." Moreover, Hipponax's Ionic dialect and his extensive use of foreign words made his work unsuited to an ancient education system that promoted Attic, the dialect of classical Athens. Today the longest fragment of complete, consecutive verses comprises only six lines. Archeologists working at Oxyrhynchus have added to the meagre collection with tattered scraps of papyrus, of which the longest, published in 1941, has parts of over fifty choliambics.

Old Comedy, as a medium for invective and abuse, was a natural successor to iambus from the viewpoint of Aristotle and Aristophanes, the master of Old Comedy, certainly borrowed inspiration from Hipponax: "Someone ought to give them a Bupalus or two on the jaw—that might shut them up for a bit" the men's chorus says about the women's chorus in Lysistrata, and "Wonderful poet, Hipponax!" Dionysus exclaims in Frogs, while trying to disguise the pain inflicted on himself during a flogging. A quote attributed to Hipponax by Stobaeus actually appears to have been composed by a New Comedy poet. (Note: "The best marriage for a sensible man is to get a woman's good character as a wedding gift: for this dowry alone preserves the household ..." —fr. 182, translated and annotated by Douglas Gerber, Greek Iambic Poetry, Loeb Classical Library (1999), page 497)

=== Some Hipponactean sayings ===
- "There are two days when a woman is a pleasure: the day one marries her and the day one carries out her dead body." (δύ᾿ ἡμέραι γυναικός εἰσιν ἥδισται, ὅταν γαμῇ τις κἀκφέρῃ τεθνηκυῖαν) (Note: (Attribution to Hipponax is not accepted by all scholars—Douglas Gerber, Greek Iambic Poetry, Loeb Classical Library (1999), page 405) (Note: A variant of these lines was used nearly a thousand years later by Palladas. Prosper Mérimée would use that variant as the epigraph to Carmen. Vladimir Dal also included a variation in his collection of Russian proverbs.)
- "drank like a lizard in a privy."
- "croaking like a raven in a privy."
- "sister of cow manure"
- "opening of filth...self-exposer" (βορβορόπιν...ἀνασυρτόπολιν) (Note: Descriptions of a woman, recorded by Suda: "Hipponax calls her 'opening of filth' as one who is impure, from βορβορος (filth), and 'self-exposer' from ἀνασύρεσθαι (to pull up one's clothes)."—cited and translated by Douglas Gerber, Greek Iambic Poetry, Loeb Classical Library (1999), page 467)
- "Mimnes, you who gape open all the way to the shoulders." (Μιμνῆ κατωμόχανε): (Note: Mimnes was a painter, here addressed hyperbolically as a sodomite (wide-arse, or ευρύπρωκτος, euryproktos, in this case gaping all the way to the shoulders)—cited and translated by Douglas Gerber, Greek Iambic Poetry, Loeb Classical Library (1999), page 375)
- "interprandial pooper" (μεσσηγυδορποχέστης) (Note: A comic word coined by Hipponax, defined by Suetonius in On Defamatory Words as "...one who often retires to defecate in the midst of a meal so that he may fill himself up again."—cited and translated by Douglas Gerber, Greek Iambic Poetry, Loeb Classical Library (1999), page 437)

== Sources ==
- Easterling, P.E. (Series Editor), Bernard M.W. Knox (Editor), Cambridge History of Classical Literature, v.I, Greek Literature, 1985. ISBN 0-521-21042-9, cf. Chapter 5, "Elegy and Iambus", pp. 158–164 on Hipponax.
- Murray, Gilbert, A History of Ancient Greek Literature, 1897. Cf. p. 88
- Todd M. Compton, Hipponax: Creating the Pharmakos at the Center for Hellenic Studies
