= Choliamb =

Greek and Latin poetic verse form

Choliambic verse (Ancient Greek: χωλίαμβος), also known as limping iambs or scazons or halting iambic, is a form of meter in poetry. It is found in both Greek and Latin poetry in the classical period. Choliambic verse is sometimes called scazon, or "lame iambic", because it brings the reader down on the wrong "foot" by reversing the stresses of the last few beats. It was originally pioneered by the Greek lyric poet Hipponax, who wrote "lame trochaics" as well as "lame iambics".

The basic structure is much like iambic trimeter, except that the last cretic is made heavy by the insertion of a longum instead of a breve. Also, the third anceps of the iambic trimeter line must be short in limping iambs. In other words, the line scans as follows (where — is a long syllable, ⏑ is a short syllable, and × is an anceps):

× — ⏑ — | × — ⏑ — | ⏑ — — —

As in all classical verse forms, the phenomenon of brevis in longo is observed, so the last syllable can actually be short or long.

== Latin ==
The Roman poet Catullus' poems 8, 22 and 39 serve as examples of choliambic verse.

miser Catulle, dēsinās ineptīre
et quod vidēs perīsse perditum dūcās
fulsēre quondam candidī tibī sōlēs,
cum ventitābās quō puella dūcēbat
amāta nōbīs quant(um) amābitur nūlla. (Catullus, 8.1–5)

"Wretched Catullus, you should stop being foolish,
and what you see has perished, you should consider it lost.
Once suns shone brightly for you
when you used to go wherever your girl led you,
loved by us as much as no girl will ever be loved."

Occasionally, one of the first three longa in the line may be resolved into two short syllables, but this is rare. There is usually a caesura or word-break after either the 5th or the 7th syllable.

In later poets, such as Persius, Martial, and Ausonius, resolution was used more freely, in any of the first four longa, and sometimes the first foot might be an anapaest (u u –).

== See also ==
- Prosody (Latin)
