= Dactylic pentameter =

Greek and Latin poetic verse form

The dactylic pentameter is a verse-form which, in classical Greek and Latin poetry, follows a dactylic hexameter to make up an elegiac couplet. It features two halves, each consisting of two dactyls, for which spondees can be substituted in the first half only, followed by a longum. Thus the line most normally looks as follows (note that "—" marks a long syllable, "∪" a short syllable and " ∪ ∪ " either one long or two shorts):

    |— ∪ ∪ | — ∪ ∪ | — || — ∪ ∪ | — ∪ ∪ | —     

As in all classical verse-forms, the phenomenon of brevis in longo is observed, so the last syllable can actually be short or long. Also, the line has a diaeresis, where a word boundary must occur, after the first half-line, here marked ||.

"Pentameter" may seem a slightly strange term for this meter, as it seems to have six parts, but the reason is that each half of the line has two and a half feet, the two together thus making up five. Each half-line is called a hemiepes (half-epic), as resembling half a line of epic dactylic hexameter.

The pentameter is notable for its very tight structure, with substitutions allowed only in the first two feet. It rarely occurs except in elegiac couplets.

== See also ==
- Prosody (Latin)
