= Odes 1.4 =

Poem by Horace

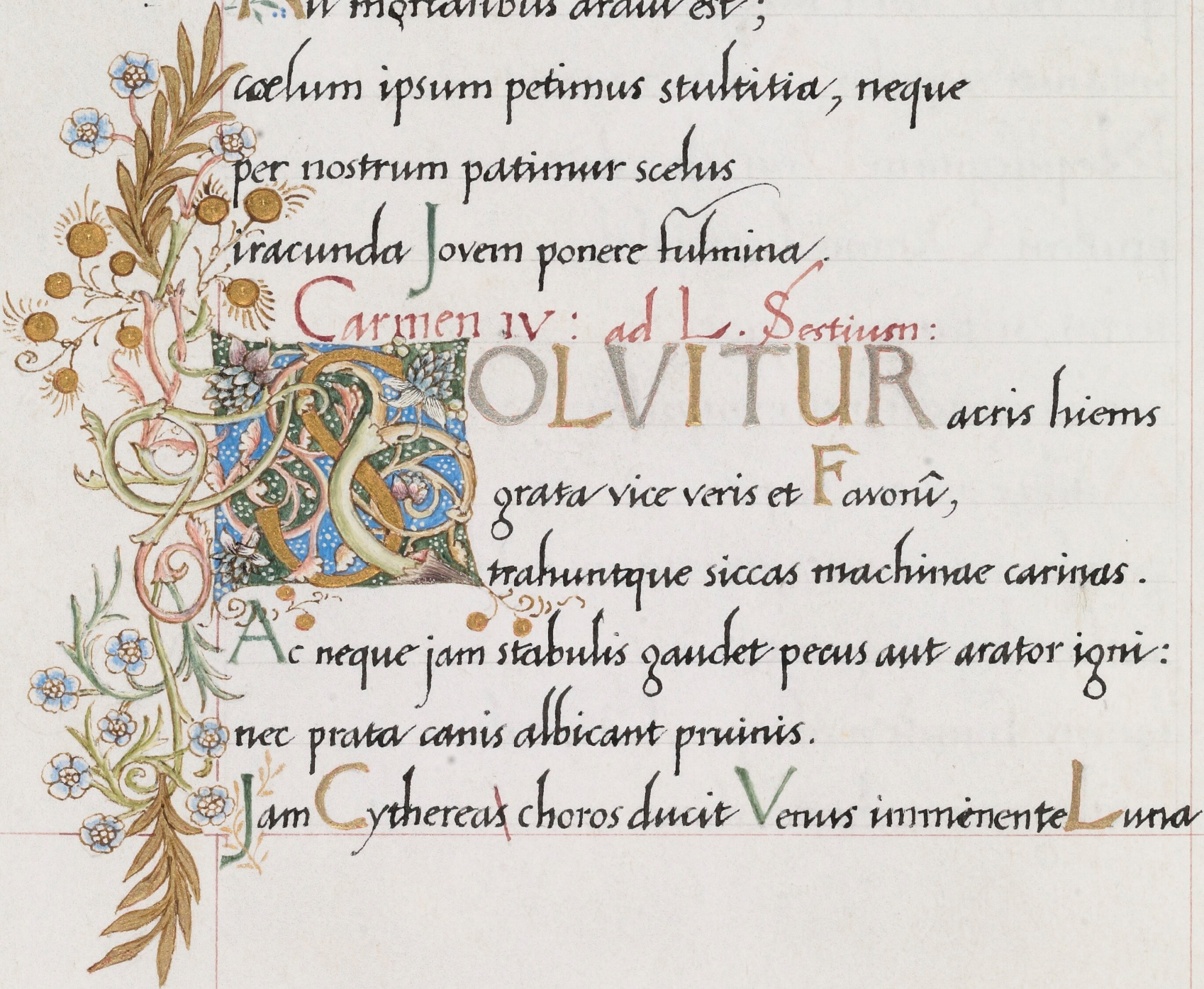
Opening of Solvitur acris hiems, illumination and calligraphy by William Morris (Bodleian)

Odes 1.4, also known by its incipit, Solvitur acris hiems, is an Ode by Horace addressed to Sestius, suffect consul in 23 BC. The poem combines the coming of spring and the cycle of seasonal change with ideas of linear temporality and mortality, with recourse to the consolatory sympotic strategy of carpe diem. Assessing its quality, often relative to Odes 4.7—to which it is a "lovely forerunner"—scholars and critics have noted the technical mastery and subtle ambiguities, simple singularity of concept (Note: Horace Ars Poetica 23: denique sit quod vis, simplex dumtaxat et unum, "in the end, let it be what you will, so long as it is straightforwardly single-ply and unitary", "simple and unified") notwithstanding the range and contrasts in emotion, tone, and thought, the 'ground covered' in its twenty-line engagement with the "human condition".

== Background ==
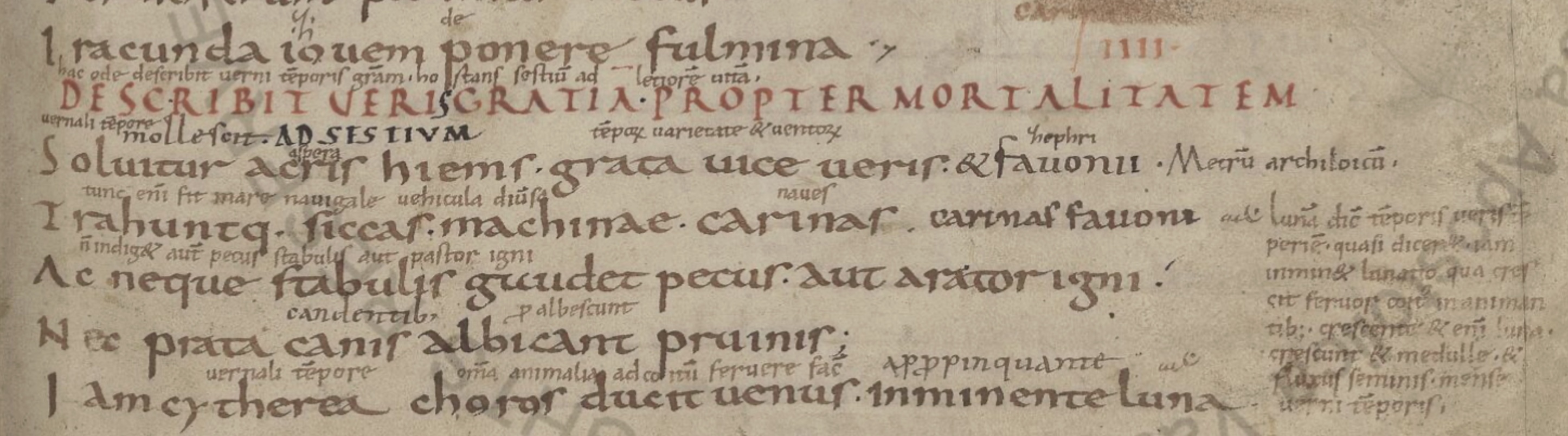

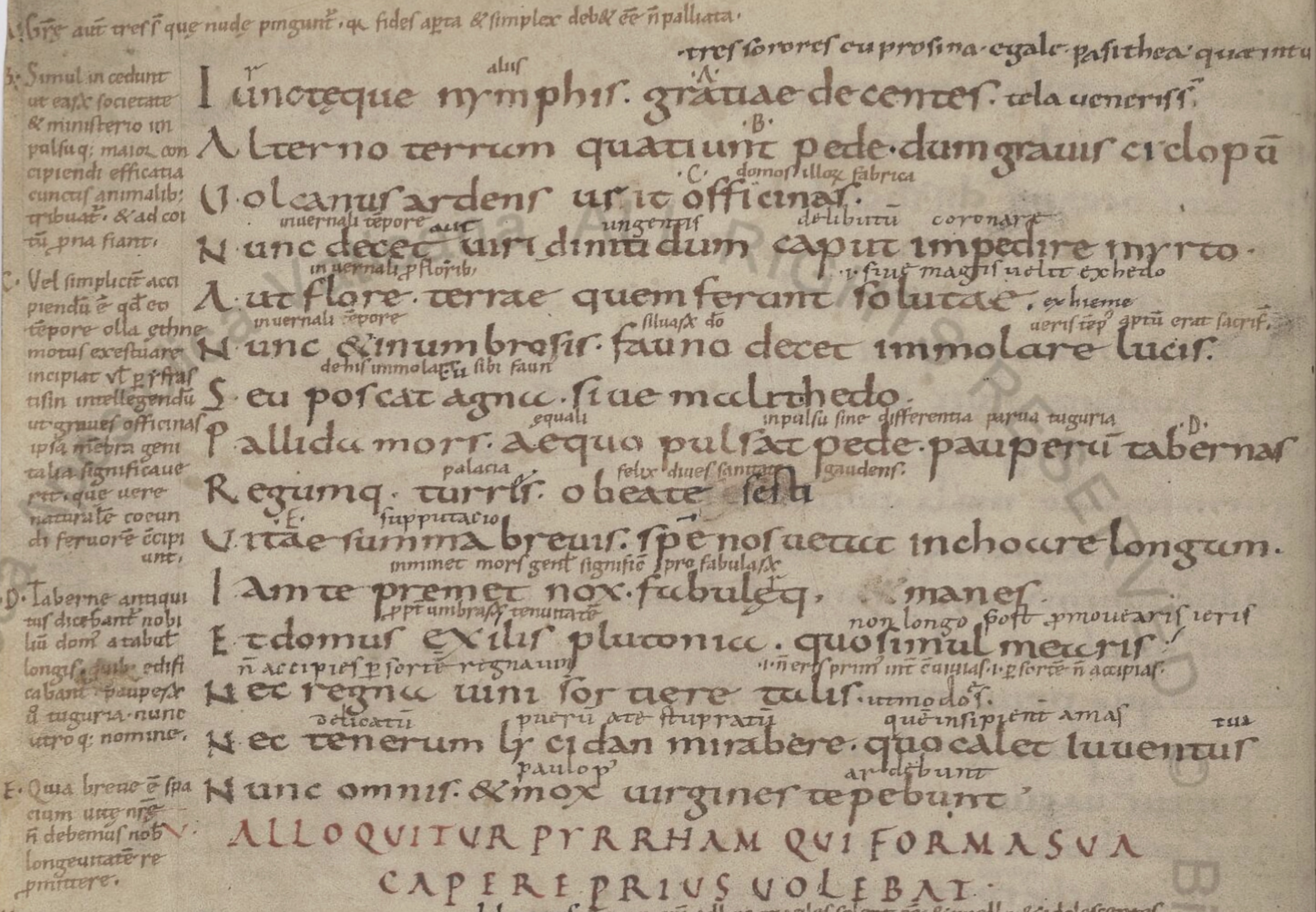
Ninth-century manuscript ("R"), perhaps the oldest for the works of Horace, in the Vatican Library, acquired from the estate of Christina of Sweden, formerly owned by the Abbey of St. Peter and St. Paul, Wissembourg

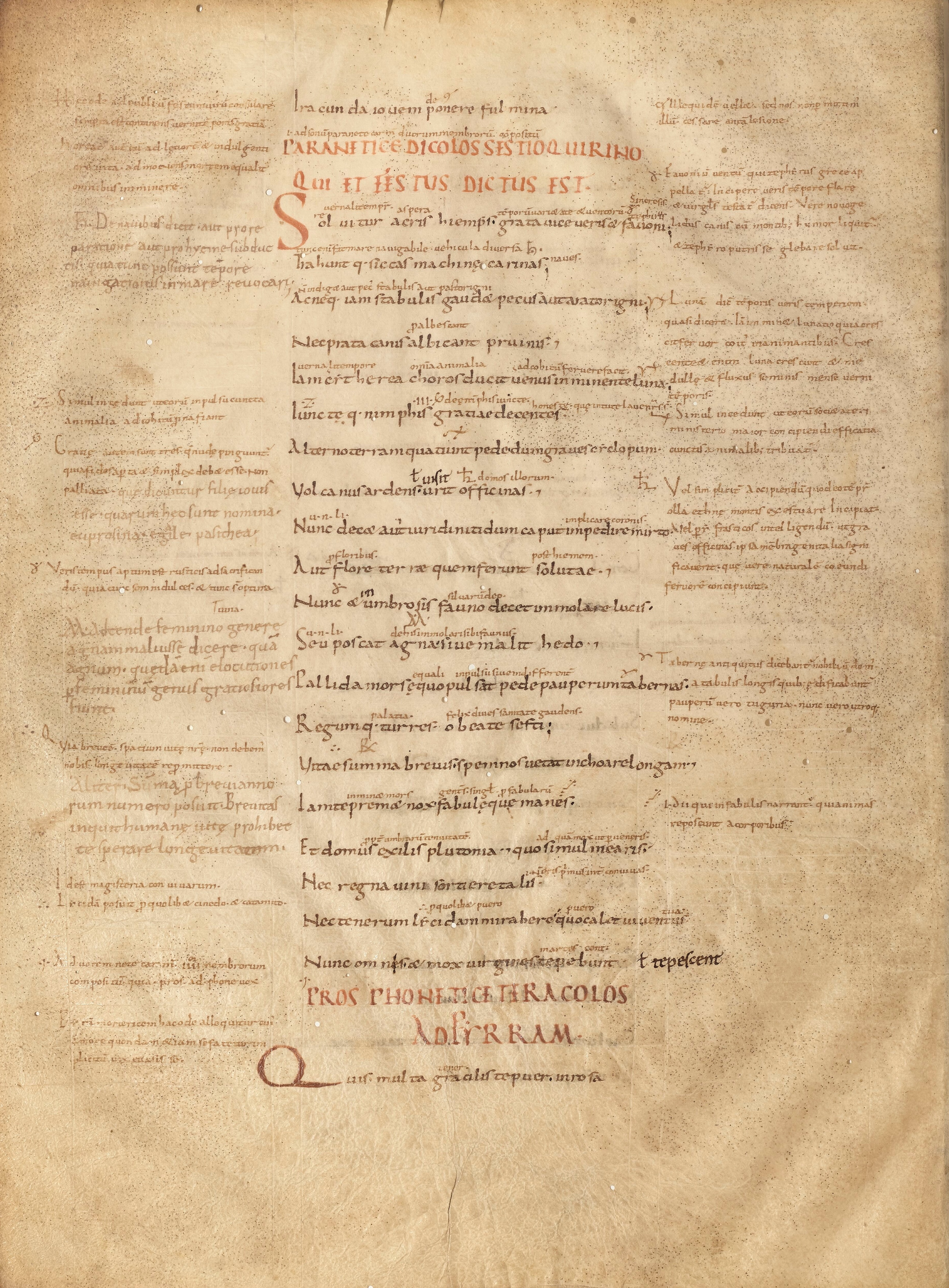
Eleventh-century manuscript ("φ"), with detailed scholia (BnF)

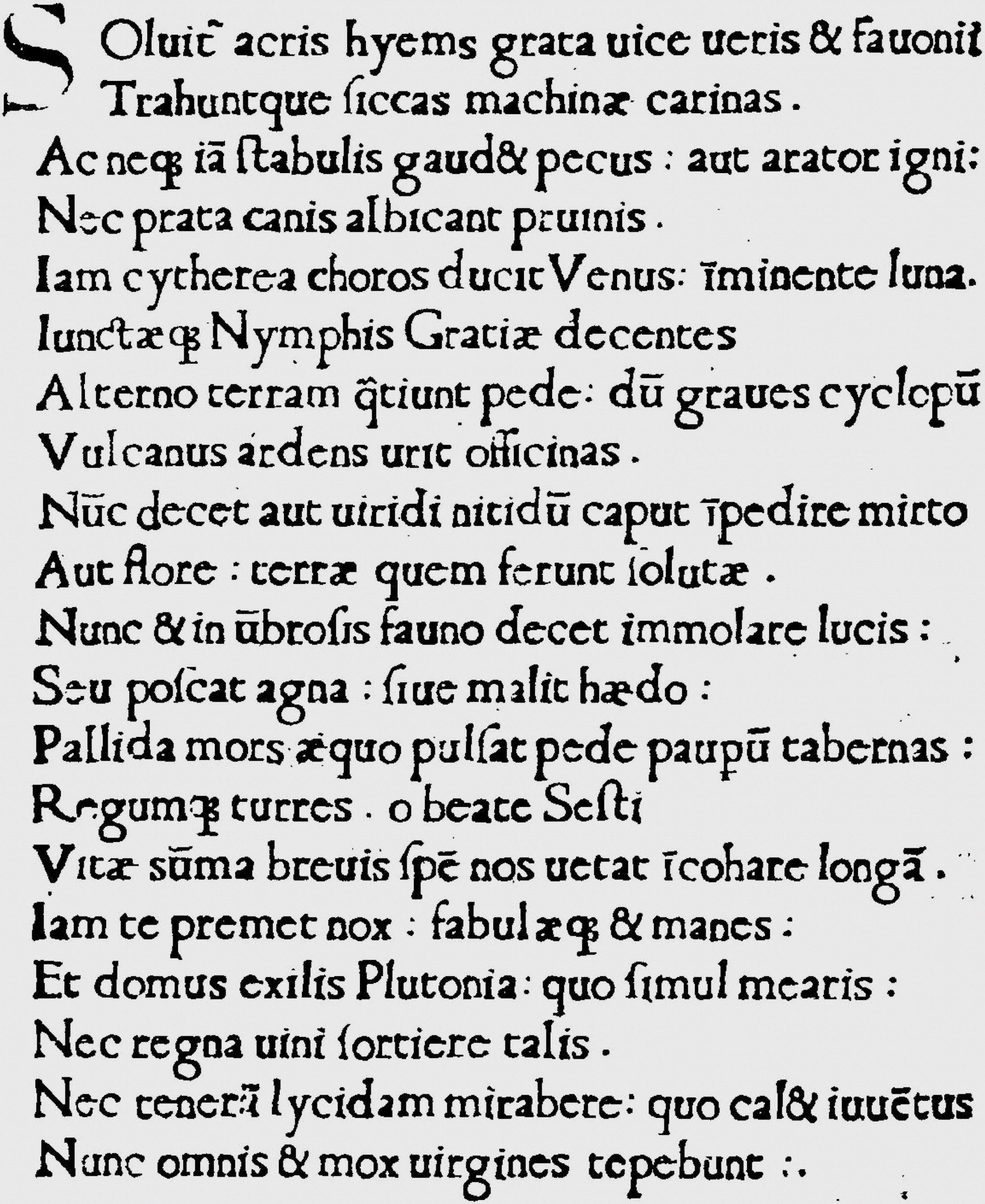
1471–2 editio princeps, with many abbreviations and ligatures; the first of twenty-three fifteenth-century incunable editions of the complete works of Horace

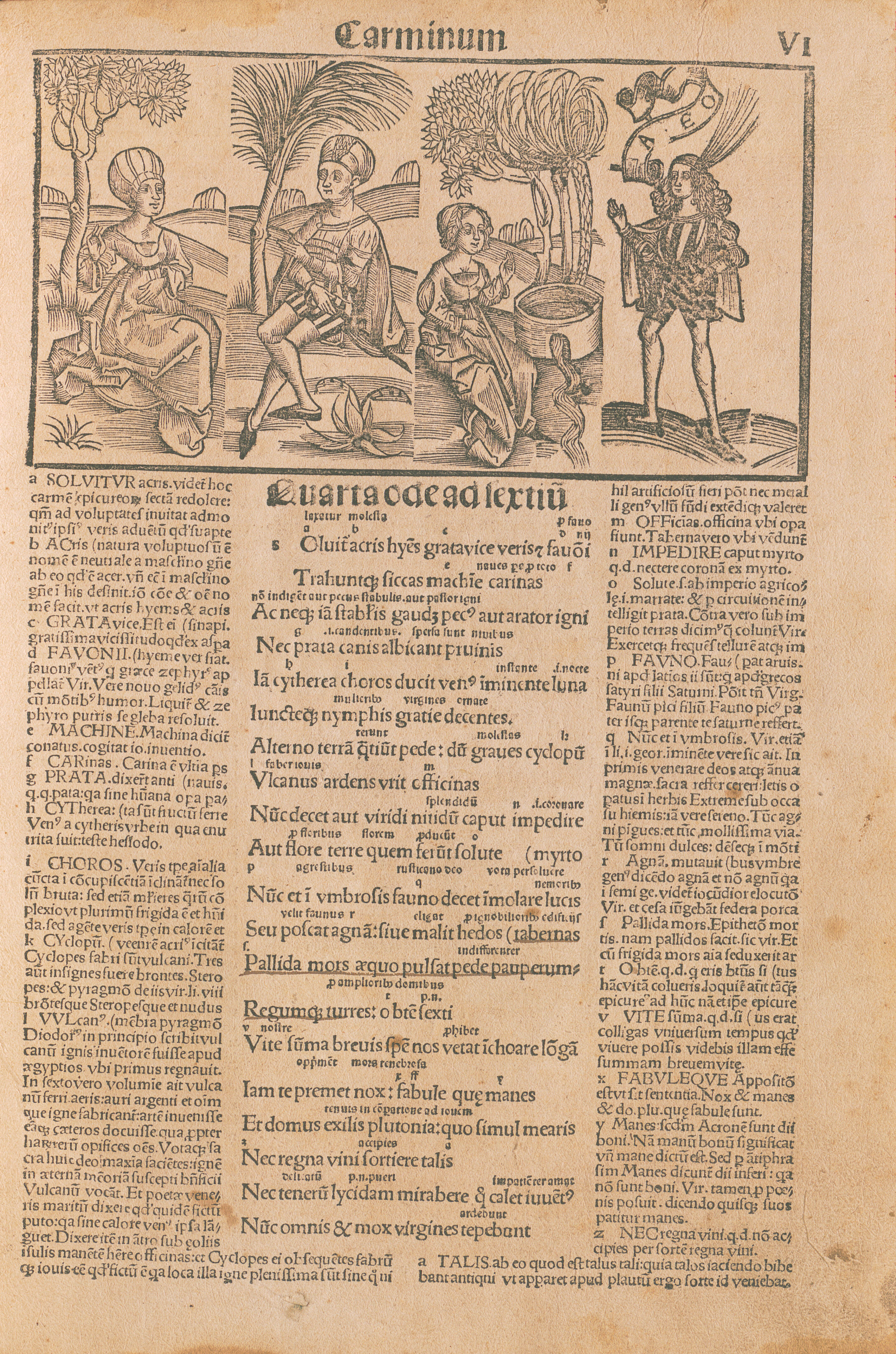
First printed edition of the works of Horace with illustrations, edited by Jakob Locher and published by Johann Grüninger in Strasbourg in 1498, with interlinear glosses, two columns of commentary, and woodcut images; their relationship with the text is unclear

The coming of spring, celebrated in the Song of Songs (Note: Song of Songs 2.11f.: "...lo, the winter is past, the rain is over and gone; The flowers appear on the earth; the time of the singing of birds is come..." (King James Version)) and universal to the human experience in temperate regions, has Greek literary antecedents in poems by Alcaeus and Leonidas of Tarentum, the latter quoted more than once by Cicero during the civil wars. (Note: Alcaeus fr. 286(a) (numbering per Campbell Loeb edition; P. Oxy. 2301 fr. 1); Leonidas A.P. X.1; Cicero Epistulae ad Atticum IX.18.3, X.2) These poems include references to the Zephyr, frost thawing, flowers blooming, the start of the sailing season, Priapus—and the realm of Tartarus below. Horace would return to the subject of spring in Odes 4.7 and 4.12, although similarly their juxtaposition of nature's cyclical time and the linear life of man, of sorrow at its passing and the implicit injunction to enjoy it while one can with banqueting, wine, and love-making (carpe diem, nunc est bibendum (Note: Horace Odes 4.7, 4.12; carpe diem "pluck the day" (it being ripe) 1.11.8, nunc est bibendum "now is the time to drink" 1.37.1)), may make it misleading to call these "spring poems", for "if spring comes, can winter be far behind?" Yet unlike the Epitaphion Bionis, Catullus 5, and Odes 4.7, Horace has no need to spell the temporal contrasts out in full; (Note: Epitaphion Bionis 99ff.; Catullus 5.4–6 soles occidere et redire possunt: / nobis, cum semel occidit brevis lux, / nox est perpetua una dormienda, "suns can set and rise again; for us, when once our short-lived light has set, unitary and never-ending is the night we must sleep"; Horace Odes 4.7.13–16 damna tamen celeres reparant caelestia lunae: / nos ubi decidimus / quo pius Aeneas, quo Tullus dives et Ancus, / pulvis et umbra sumus "yet fleet moons repair their losses in the sky: when once we have descended whither pious Aeneas, whither wealthy Tullus and Ancus, but dust and shade are we") his readers, steeped in the tradition, can make the connections themselves, identifying the "correspondence between spring and youth".

== Structure ==
The cycle of the seasons has its counterpart in the poem's "open-ended" ring composition or chiastic structure, the five quatrains of men at work→gods of Olympus→Faunus→gods of the Underworld→men at play, opening with the advent of spring and resumption of activity, through the intrusion of death, to leisurely closure in the promise of sex and renewal. Complementary analyses see a more complex twenty-line ten-couplet five-quatrain mirroring; a "12–8 sonnet-like structure", pale death intruding in line 13; "a circle and a line", structure matching meaning; a "diminuendo " from "the panorama of spring" to the specificity of a "boy-favourite"; expansion outwards from a contrapuntal core; and a "sonic circle". Running throughout is the tension between the cyclical and "idealized temporality" of nature, anonymous and ultimately interchangeable (pecus, the herd), and the "contingent" linear lifetime of the singular and irreplaceable individual—Sestius and Lycidas are named only after Death intrudes, i.e., three stanzas of "repeatable time", then "time advances in a line".

In the 12–8 analysis, the chiastic humans work→gods relax→gods work→humans relax (1–12) is followed by death (13–17) and the hedonistic response of the symposium and love-making (18–20). But darkness and desolation may be found throughout, not only after the rupture of pale death in line 13; there are already "definite undertones of the death-theme" in the opening spring picture. There is dissolution and harshness, the groaning of heavy machinery, man and beast forced to seek refuge, manufactory grave and grievous, ponderousness, fire and therefore ash, groves gloomy and umbral. In classical moralizing, ships and sea-faring were emblematic of transgression and decline. Before spring's advent, the herd and the ploughman were joyous indoors; returning from comfort to the fields—before they are ploughed, a pristine and "brilliant landscape"—that happiness is by implication lost. The moon that wanes, that rises in her chariot before going beneath the earth, is associated with change, with loss and death in Odes 2.11, 2.18, and 4.7. Spring liberates, solvitur, while death constricts, premet, but the verb used for the joining of Nymphs with Graces, iungere, is cognate with iugum, "yoke", and the verb for the garlanding, impedire, is that for shackling and impeding (-ped- also serving to "transition" between the "joyous step" of the dance and Death's "tread"). There is the paradox of blood sacrifice for the longevity of the flock. Venus leads the dance, her husband Vulcan, lame and cheated on, cannot join in, underscoring his powerlessness and "deformity". The echo of the dance, quatiunt pede, in Death's knocking or kicking on the door, pulsat pede, transforms the former into a "frightening portent of it"; the evenness of Death's knocking, aequo pede, makes the dance alterno pede "almost 'out of step'"; already it is in danger of being overly frenetic, shaking the earth. With pallida Mors, "pale Death", the whiteness (Note: Ovid Ars Amatoria II.440 canet in igne cinis, "ash will turn a greyish white upon the fire", the verb canet cognate with the adjective canus ("canis ")) of the frost and even the green viridis of the myrtle wreath is reassociated with death; the word viridis may also be used of pallor, as in Appendix Vergiliana, while garlands were used in honouring the dead. Enjoying life while one can may be one response to death, and a literary topos, but it does not go away; the concluding sympotic scene is in the negative, nec...nec... Aleatory are the outcomes of casting lots, with bones, talis, to boot. Soon the maidens will grow warm for Lycidas, his appeal lessening for the youth; in time, the virgines in turn may become lukewarm, the full cycle captured in the single, ambiguous, final word tepebunt.

The thought-structure includes extensive use of antithesis, echoing the alternations of nature, including warmth and cold, wet and dry, light and darkness, sound and silence, stillness and movement, constriction and liberation, harshness and tenderness, emptiness and repletion, piety and hedonism, chance and certainty, Venus and Vulcan, Graces and Cyclopes, evergreen myrtle and spring flowers, ewe lamb and billy kid, towers and hovels, kings and paupers, long and short, youths and maidens, joy and grief. The long string of present tense verbs, which help situate the disparate activities "in one immediate and unified 'now'", is followed, after the arrival of Death and the "epigrammatic" line 15, by the tension between now and the future, with several verbs in the future for the activities from which Sestius, once brought low, will be excluded, and enjambment to add stress to resolution; "the grammar of the lines mirrors their sense". On a smaller scale, the word order, which can give "an aesthetic satisfaction unknown in English", includes expressive use of hyperbaton, as the dry keels surrounding the winches, siccas machinae carinas, the Graces joined with and embracing the Nymphs, iunctaeque Nymphis Gratiae, the Cyclopes in their weighty workshops, gravis Cyclopum officinas, the head ringed with green myrtle, viridi caput myrto, and Faunus amid the shady groves, umbrosis Fauno lucis. The unity of interlocking ideas is reinforced through anaphora and verbal repetition or echoes: (Note: Including the temporal adverbs iam ... iam ..., nunc ... nunc ..., the negatives nec ... nec ... nec ..., the alternatives aut ... aut ..., seu ... sive ..., solvitur and solutae, decentes and decet, pede ... pede ...) at first the repeated "or"s suggest there is a range of possibilities; after Death's intrusion, nox "night" is echoed by mox "soon", while the only word to appear twice is the negative nec; there are two kinds of "now", one of the repeatable present, the other "historical and single ... continually being lost". An alternative analysis sees three kinds of "now" or iam, that which looks to and is of the past (l. 3), that of the present (l. 5), and that which looks to and is of the future (l. 16); through this combining of past, present, and future, starting in spring and ending in death, the reader is left with a feeling of "totality and plenitude", of closure.

== Metre ==
Rather than a "straitjacket", metre is a source of "expressive power" and "poetic significance". Coming after his Satires, in dactylic hexameters and that look to Lucilius, and iambic Epodes, Archilochus and Hipponax their model, Horace's Odes emulate the Greek lyric tradition with its nine canonical poets. The so-called, programmatic, Parade Odes that open Book 1 are "characterized by their metrical diversity", each of the first nine poems having a different metre. Odes 1.4 (Note: Scansion of Odes 1.4, quantity notated with macron and breve, caesurae with a double vertical bar, and the diaereses after the tetrameter with a vertical ellipsis: ¯˘˘ ¯˘˘ ¯‖¯ ¯˘˘ ⋮ ¯˘ ¯˘ ¯¯ / ˘¯ ˘¯ ¯‖¯ ˘¯ ˘¯ ¯ / ¯˘˘ ¯˘˘ ¯‖¯ ¯˘˘ ⋮ ¯˘ ¯˘ ¯¯ / ¯¯ ˘¯ ¯‖¯ ˘¯ ˘¯ ¯ / ¯˘˘ ¯˘˘ ¯‖¯ ¯˘˘ ⋮ ¯˘ ¯˘ ¯¯ (5) / ¯¯ ˘¯ ¯‖¯ ˘¯ ˘¯ ¯ / ¯¯ ¯¯ ¯‖˘˘ ¯˘˘ ⋮ ¯˘ ¯˘ ¯˘ / ¯¯ ˘¯ ¯‖¯ ˘¯ ˘¯ ¯ / ¯˘˘ ¯˘˘ ¯‖˘˘ ¯˘˘ ⋮ ¯˘ ¯˘ ¯¯ / ¯¯ ˘¯ ¯‖¯ ˘¯ ˘¯ ¯ (10) / ¯˘˘ ¯¯ ¯‖¯ ¯˘˘ ⋮ ¯˘ ¯˘ ¯¯ / ¯¯ ˘¯ ¯‖¯ ˘¯ ˘¯ ¯ / ¯˘˘ ¯¯ ¯‖¯ ¯˘˘ ⋮ ¯˘ ¯˘ ¯¯ / ˘¯ ˘¯ ¯‖¯ ˘¯ ˘¯ ¯ / ¯¯ ¯˘˘ ¯‖¯ ¯˘˘ ⋮ ¯˘ ¯˘ ¯˘ (15) / ¯¯ ˘¯ ¯‖¯ ˘¯ ˘¯ ¯ / ¯˘˘ ¯¯ ¯‖¯ ¯˘˘ ⋮ ¯˘ ¯˘ ¯¯ / ¯¯ ˘¯ ¯‖¯ ˘¯ ˘¯ ¯ / ¯˘˘ ¯˘˘ ¯‖¯ ¯˘˘ ⋮ ¯˘ ¯˘ ¯¯ / ¯¯ ˘¯ ¯‖¯ ˘¯ ˘¯ ¯ (20)) is in the Third/Fourth Archilochian, in which the first line of each distich (couplet) is in the greater Archilochian (an asynartete combination of two different rhythms, comprising a dactylic tetrameter (the first three feet of which may through contraction be a spondee instead of a dactyl) followed by an ithyphallic (three trochees or brevis in longo two followed by a spondee), with a penthemimeral caesura in the third foot and a diaeresis after the tetrameter), the second line an iambic trimeter catalectic (with the first syllable anceps, a spondee substituted for the iamb in the third foot, the final syllable long, and a caesura after the fifth syllable); there is no elision. The only example in the Odes of a poem in this metre, the rotation and alternation of metrical system echo spring's "equivocal nature".

The ithyphallic takes its name from phallic processions in honour of Dionysus; as such, it may have been chosen here to correspond with the "Priapic" element noted above in Horace's Greek antecedents. In Aristotle's Poetics, dactylic hexameter is "heroic", "the most stately [or "stationary"] and weighty" metre; iambo-trochaic verse, on the other hand, is "kinetic", "expressive of motion". (Note: Aristotle Poetics 1459b: τὸ γὰρ ἡρωϊκὸν στασιμώτατον καὶ ὀγκωδέστατον τῶν μέτρων ἐστίν ... τὸ δὲ ἰαμβικὸν καὶ τετράμετρον κινητικά "for the heroic [hexameter] is the most stately and weighty of metres ... the iambic [trimeter] and [trochaic] tetrameter those of movement") As such, a "metrically literate reader" may be able to feel in Odes 1.4 the "release" as the dactylic tetrameter gives way to the iambo-trochaic. At the same time, "the metrics ... embody an underlying assertion of generic preferences", epic poetry making way for lyric. In the first line, hiems, "winter", is followed by a caesura, a metrical break; after vice, "change", coinciding with the end of the tetrameter, the new metrical system, the ithyphallic, opens with veris, "spring", metre aligned with meaning. In lines 2, 4, and 10, the caesura helps connect adjective with noun, one coming immediately before the mid-line pause, the other the line end. Death's knocking on the pauperum tabernas "hovels of the poor", is matched by the trochaic rhythm. In line 7, the only to start with five long syllables, the "heavy spondaic rhythm" is that of a "simple rustic dance".

== Mythology ==
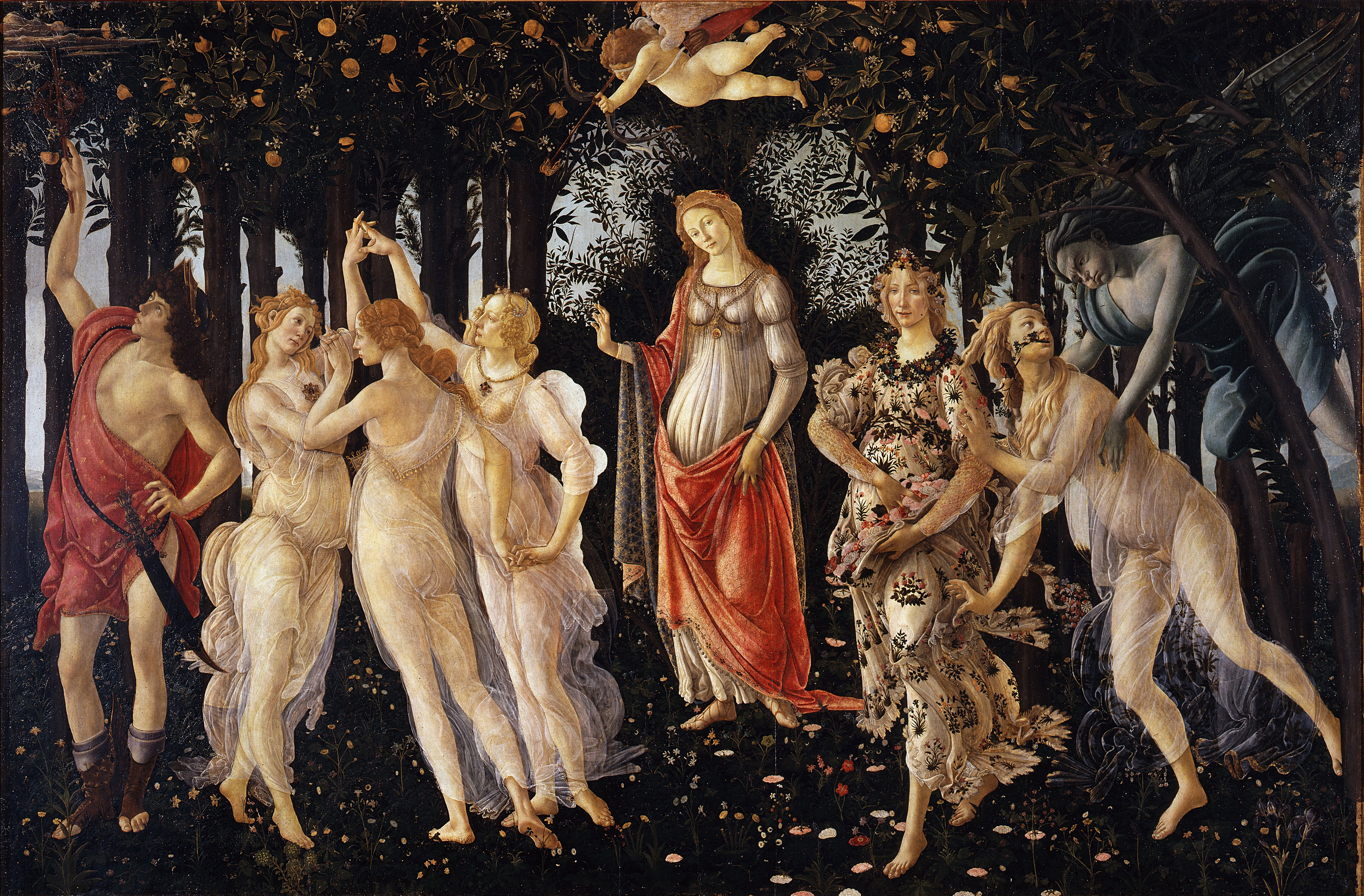
Botticelli's Primavera: Venus, Cupid in attendance, flanked by Mercury, dancing Graces, Flora, the nymph Chloris, and Favonius/Zephyrus (Galleria degli Uffizi); there may be darker presences, spring ushered in by the temporary return of Persephone from the underworld, Mercury as psychopomp

The poem's mythological plane need not imply religious belief, being operative also as symbolic and linguistic convention, as "poetic code".

Favonius, the Roman Zephyr or spring's clement west wind, is, according to Pliny the Elder, the "generative spirit of the world", his name derived from the verb fovere, to warm or nurture. According to Claudian, he is the "father of spring", Pliny giving Favonius pride of place in spring's softening of the skies and opening of the seas to navigation. In Ovid's Fasti, Flora, the "mother of flowers", tells of how, once called Chloris, she was ravished by Zephyrus/Favonius, before becoming his bride.

Venus, in the opening invocation of Lucretius' De rerum natura, is genetrix or mother and ancestral begetter of the line of Aeneas (from whom, through Iulus, the gens Julia, Julius Caesar, and Augustus claimed descent); it is she who brings plenty to the seas of navigation and the fruitful lands. In Book V of Lucretius, spring and Venus move together, with Cupid in the vanguard, followed by the Zephyr and flower-strewing Flora. Horace's epithet for Venus, Cytherea, refers to her rising from the sea and coming ashore on Cythera, off Laconia and the southeast Peloponnese, one of her supposed birthplaces, alongside the Paphos of Odes 1.30. The myrtle was sacred to her.

Luna, goddess of the moon, leans over to watch, the verb used of her, imminere "impending", having overtones of future threat; as the moon doth wax and wane, the winter that gives way to spring will return. In a fragment of Ennius, Luna on her daily course is identified with Proserpina, Persephone by interpretatio Graeca, for her time spent beneath the earth. (Note: Ennius Epicharmus in Varro De lingua Latina V.68, on Luna: hinc Epicharmus Ennii Proserpinam quoque appelat, quod solet esse sub terris, "from this the Epicharmus of Ennius also calls her Proserpina, because she is wont to be under the lands") Scholia on this line liken the waxing of the moon to the surging passion and sowing of seed among animals in spring.

The Graces feature for the first time in extant Latin literature in Horace. Typically three in number, as in Hesiod's Theogony, they were linked with spring by Stesichorus. As in Odes 1.30, here they cavort with the Nymphs in a dance led by Venus, as if "drawn from some Hellenistic Primavera". In the scholia of Pseudo-Acron may be found the interpretation that the Nymphs stand for married women, the Graces maidens, while music and dance on like themes may have been a feature of earlier Athenian symposia. (Note: Xenophon Symposium 7.5 εἰ δὲ ὀρχοῖντο πρὸς τὸν αὐλὸν σχήματα ἐν οἷς Χάριτές τε καὶ Ὧραι καὶ Νύμφαι γράφονται, πολὺ ἂν οἶμαι αὐτούς γε ῥᾷον διάγειν καὶ τὸ συμπόσιον πολὺ ἐπιχαριτώτερον εἶναι, "but were they, to the strains of the aulos, to dance figures inscribed with the Graces, Horai, and Nymphs, I imagine they would be at considerably greater ease themselves and the symposium would be much more enchanting")

The Cyclopes, shepherds in the Odyssey, are thunderbolt-forgers in Hesiod's Theogony, and nymph-scaring smiths toiling away at the "anvils of Hephaestus" in Callimachus. Their foundry is variously located, on Lipari or beneath Mount Etna, Jupiter availing himself of their thunderbolts in the more tempestuous times to come. The iconicity of sound in dum...Cyclopum is that of Cyclopes hammering on anvils. Vulcan, the "cripple" and "cuckolded" husband of Venus, "blazing" or "ardent"—effect for cause—is off to inspect their workshops, their officinas, as of a Roman manufacturer, "a calculatedly prosaic word, to round off the fantasy". The scholia by contrast interpret the 'weighty workshops' figuratively, to be understood as referring to heavily laden "membra genitalia".

Faunus, the native Italian woodland and countryside deity, was identified with Pan, and likely fills Priapus' part in the Greek antecedents above. It is he who affords divine protection to the herd and the ploughman of line three, having also a darker side, that of an amorous pursuer of nymphs. Faunus was endowed too with prophetic powers and if properly approached—involving, according to Ovid's Fasti, dietary and sexual abstinence, animal sacrifice, sprinkling the head with water, and the pressing of leaves to the temple—might be consulted for an oracular response to the "ever-present question" amid change, 'what will tomorrow bring?' In Ovid's Fasti, such solemnities take place on the Ides of February; later the same day began the Parentalia, the feast of the dead. Linked also with the Lupercalia, Faunus' victims are figurative, the sacrifice symbolic: to the "great phallic god of the wild" are offered girl and boy, to be pierced and finished off with the blade is Lycidas. Simultaneously, Faunus' presence "suggests the simple pieties of the Italian countryside".

Mors, death personified, is pale—cause for effect—and impartial, striking with his foot—and the "lavish" alliteration and plosive onomatopoeia of p, t, b, and d—the doors of rich and poor alike with the same sound. "Storied" are the Manes, the spirits of the dead, while Pluto's underworld realm and meagre mansion is "insubstantial", oxymoronic play on Plutus, wealth; the adjective used, Plutonia, "more grandiose" than the closest alternative, the genitive Plutonis, is fit for the "sphere of epic and tragedy".

== Mores ==
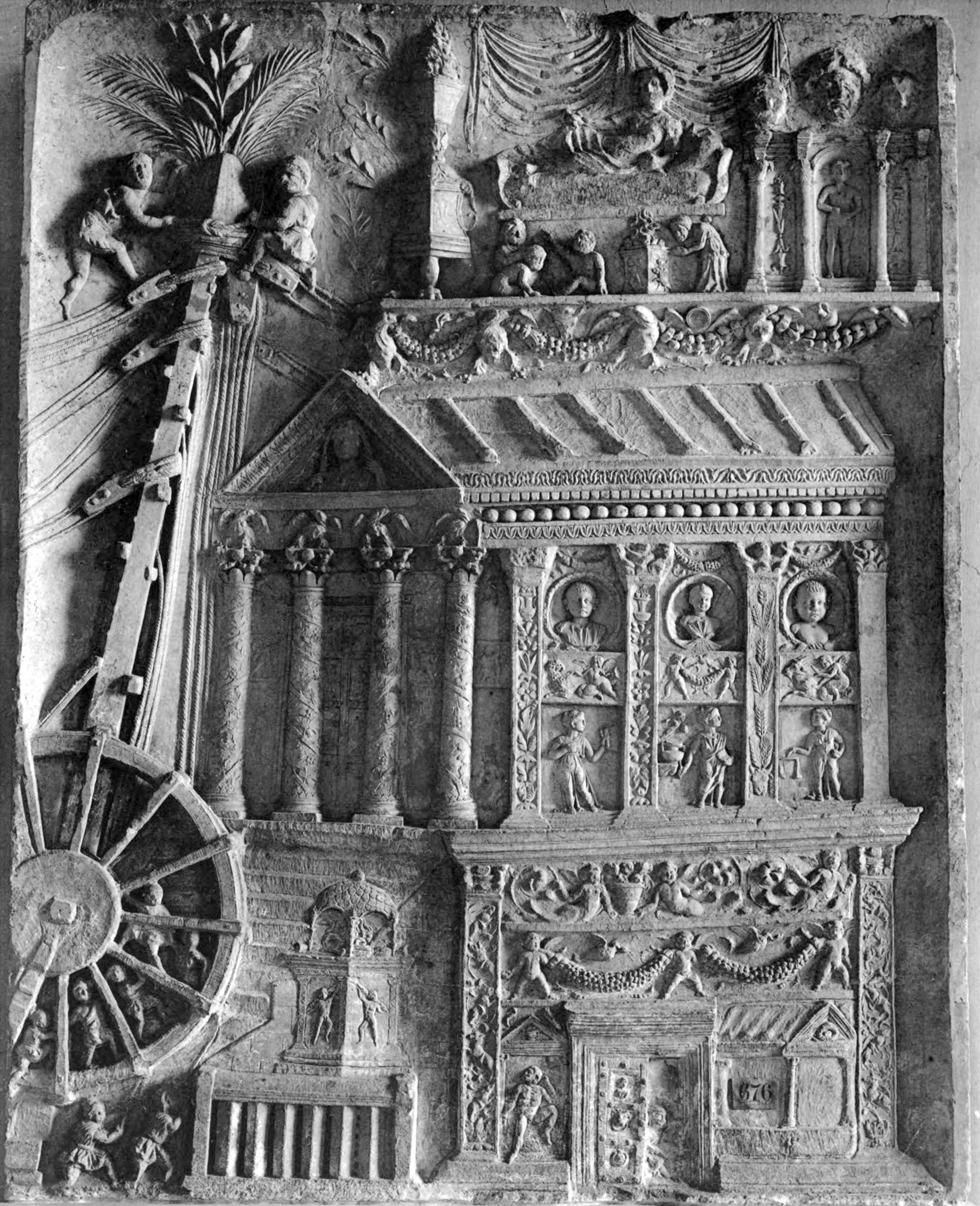
Relief from a tomb in Rome; at the diolkos, cranes, windlasses, rollers, and wheeled sleds may have been used for hauling boats

In the almost tideless Mediterranean, it was customary to draw boats—or, pars pro toto, their "keels"—a short distance up out of the water, as encountered at Ostia in the Octavius of Minucius Felix, for shelter from winter storms; manoeuvred onto sleds on wheels or rollers, they could be hauled with pulleys and winches, and propped up on blocks. (Note: Vitruvius De architectura X.ii.10 eadem ratione et temperatis funibus et trocleis subductiones navium efficiuntur, "by like means, and the adjustment of ropes and pulleys, the hauling ashore of ships is brought about") In Vegetius, the sailing season opens in early March, in the Fasti Praenestini and Macrobius' Saturnalia, April. The grating velar k and g sounds of acris ... grata ... -que ... siccas machinae carinas in the opening couplet, like the cracking ice and creaking cables, give way, with the abundant i sounds of the whistling wind, to the liquid r sounds and softer spirant v and sibilant s sounds of spring. (Sound was "even more important than it is in modern poetry", since Roman poetry was for recitation.) The previous ode, 1.3, purports to be a propempticon or "sending-off" poem, wishing Virgil a safe voyage to Greece, though this may be a metapoetic allegory for his epic venture; following on so closely, the boats we see setting out to sea in spring may be a reference to the start, freshness, and novelty of the Odes.

The mention of wine in the concluding convivial symposium scene has "illocutionary force", whereby the declarative becomes hortative, 'drink now while you can'. As in the cup of Lethe, the act of drinking is an archetypal symbol of liberation and release; time stands by in the "celebration of the present", yet this is illusory, death inescapable, in vino veritas. In a metapoetic sense, wine is also the source of poetic inspiration, as in Epistles 1.19, where Liber (Bacchus) enlists poets among his fauns and satyrs. Varro is cited by Nonius Marcellus on the subject of the arbiter, magister, or modimperator potandi, the "master of ceremonies" appointed, by the throwing of knucklebones or dice, to preside over the proper mixing and drinking of the wine.

The banquet equated with life, in the antepenultimate line there is sorrow at its irrepeatability; it is foreshadowed by the glistening garlanded head in line 9, "glossy" because of the use of fragrant hair oil, garlanded as participants oftentimes wore wreaths. The scene's homoeroticism, a convention of Greek erotic poetry, sees the appeal of Lycidas, the eromenos, change as he approaches manhood; his very name may hint at both the animal and the divine, through the Greek λύκος or "wolf" and the cult practices of Mount Lykaion in Arcadia, the name Lycidas appearing in earlier pastoral poetry with its idealized bucolic and Arcadian escapism, the Idylls of Theocritus and Virgil's Eclogues. As the nautical imagery links with the preceding Ode, the "lyrical eroticism" of the ending connects with the Ode that follows, 1.5, on the topic of love, the final word tepebunt, "warming up", as is the weather, reinforcing the equivalence of spring with youth.

== Addressee ==
While the poem's speaker has a relatively undeveloped persona, that of a disinterested if knowing acquaintance of a prominent patrician politician, the character of Sestius is more complex, functioning as he does as a reminder of the closeness of death, even for those in comfortable circumstances, in elevated positions. The verb used for his journey to the underworld is used elsewhere most often by Lucretius for the movement of inanimate forces, while the other verbs where he is the subject or object similarly stress his lack of "agency" and "powerlessness". Augustus' choice of Sestius, known for his loyalty to Brutus, to replace him as consul as part of the so-called second settlement of 23 BC has seen the vernal opening interpreted as a metaphor, hinting at a "milder political climate"; but the spring is not wholly serene and peaceable, there is still betrayal (Venus and Vulcan), uncertainty, and death. 23 BC was also the year the first three books of the Odes were most likely published; this poem's position within the collection, Maecenas, Augustus, and Virgil the addressees in the three poems preceding, points to it being "more than a simple occasional piece".

Sestius' bearing upon the poem may be even closer: in a letter to his friend Atticus, Cicero mention's "Sestius' vessels", brick stamps with his name (indicating ownership of a brickyard) have been found at the towered villa of Settefinestre, and he is named on amphorae (used in shipping wine); these may be alluded to in the poem's "dry keels", "workshops", "towers", and "wine". Many of the bricks are stamped OF (officina, "workshop"), while an amphora stamp found at Cosa, LVC.LV.SE, may even intimate Lyc(idas) was a real person, perhaps a Greek slave or freedman of Lu(cius) Se(stius).

== Reception ==
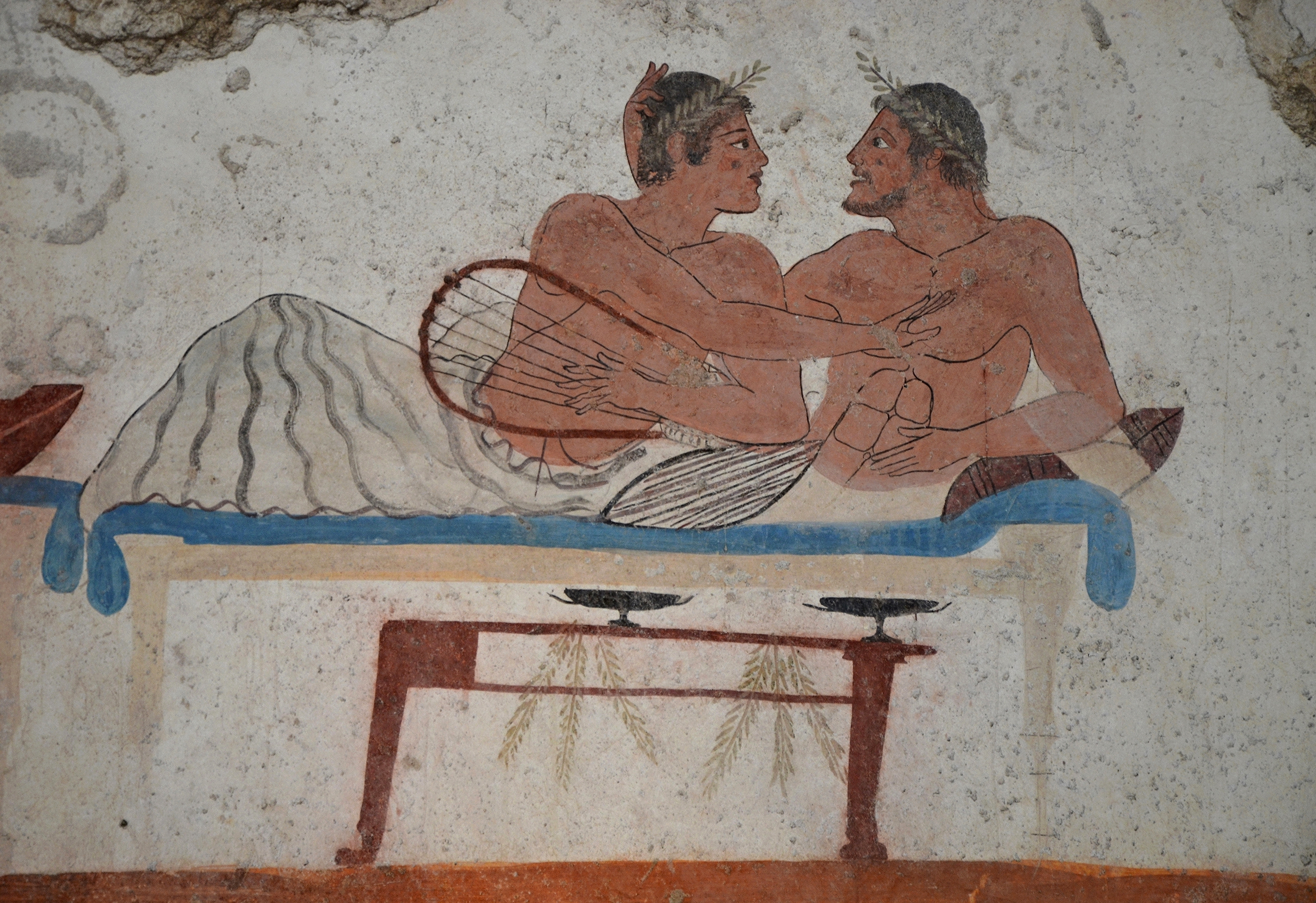
Symposium scene with kylikes (wine cups) on the table and garlanded symposiasts, the elder denoted by his beard, from the Tomb of the Diver at Poseidonia in Magna Graecia

The fourth of the twelfth-century Quirinalia of Metellus of Tegernsee begins with the line Solvitur acris hiemps tersa nive persecutionis, "Melteth harsh winter with the snow of persecution wiped away", echoing the incipit of the fourth of Horace's Odes. Eight centuries later, Paul Claudel would write a poem with which to greet spring entitled Solvitur acris hiems. In his search for the sources of Botticelli's Primavera, Aby Warburg noted a close relationship with Poliziano's Rusticus of 1483, vv. 217–221 of which draw in turn on Horace, borrowing alterno terram pede from line 7. In Milton's "Horatian" Sonnet 20 To Mr. Lawrence, there is "conscious imitation". Walter Savage Landor presented a copy of the works of Horace to Robert Browning, annotated in the margins with his own critiques, including, for Odes 1.4, the provocation that the pale death of line 13 "has nothing to do with the above". The image that follows, of death knocking at the door, recurs in the works of poets including Coleridge, Byron, and Tennyson. According to Ezra Pound, the ode's first line alone "has a week's work in it for any self-respecting translator", including at least one day of inspiration. In the translation of the Odes by British Prime Minister Gladstone, published in 1894, the year he left office, in line with Victorian mores, Lycidas goes unnamed, a "needful" disguise of the homoeroticism, a "paraphrase in mitigation". A setting to music of the ode, likely by Wolfgang Gräfinger, may be found in the marginalia to the 1505 Donnino Pinzi Venetian edition of the works of Horace in the Cantonal Library of St. Gallen. Another was published in 1930, with piano accompaniment, for singing in schools and colleges.

== See also ==
- Et in Arcadia ego (Poussin)
- Lycidas (Milton)
- Mead of poetry
