= Odes 1.23 =

One of the Odes of Horace

Odes 1.23, also known as Ad Chloen ('To Chloe'), or by its incipit, Vitas inuleo me similis, Chloe, is one of the Odes of Horace. The poem is written in the fourth Asclepiadean metre, and is of uncertain date; not after 23 BC.

== Summary ==
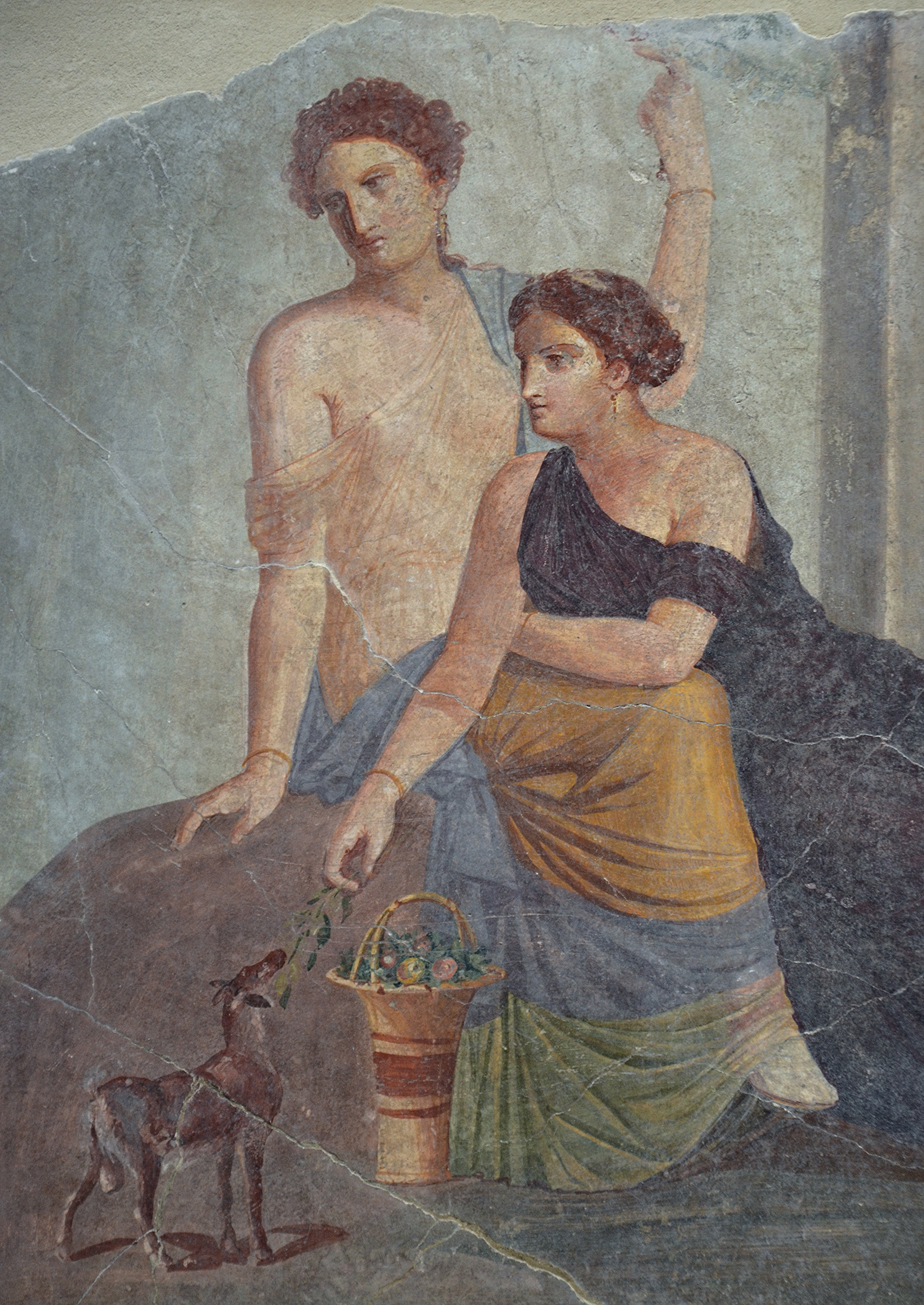
Women with a fawn, 1st century AD fresco from Pompeii

You shun me like a timid fawn (inuleus) that seeks its dam on the trackless mountain and trembles at the rustling bramble or the darting lizard (1–8). I am not a tiger or lion going to eat you. I'll do you no harm. Cease to cling to your mother. You are ripe for a mate (9–12).

== Analysis ==
Clifford Herschel Moore (1902) thinks this poem is a study from a Greek original; possibly from Anacreon's verses, of which we have a fragment (no. 51), which includes the same comparison of the girl to a fawn: "Gently as a new-born fawn unweaned, which quivers from terror, when left in the wood by its antlered mother."

== Reception ==
Cf. Dobson's roundel: "You shun me, Chloe, wild and shy, / As some stray fawn that seeks its mother". For difference between 1st century and 19th century feeling, cf. Landor's "Gracefully shy is yon Gazelle". Spenser, F. Q. 3.7.1: "Like as an hind forth singled from the herd, / That hath escaped from a ravenous beast, / Yet flies away of her own feet afeard; / And every leaf, that shaketh with the least / Murmur of wind, her terror hath increased."

== Bibliography ==
- Nielsen, Rosemary M. (1970). "Horace Odes 1.23: Innocence". Arion: A Journal of Humanities and the Classics. 9 (4): 373–78.
- Fredricksmeyer, Ernst A. (1994). "Horace's Chloe (Odes 1.23): Inamorata or Victim?". The Classical Journal. 89 (3): 251–59.

Attribution:

- Bennett, Charles E. (1901). Horace: Odes and Epodes. Norwood, MA: Allyn and Bacon. p. 31.
- Moore, Clifford Herschel (1902). Horace: The Odes and Epodes and Carmen Saeculare. United States: American Book Company. pp. 124–5.
- Shorey, Paul; Laing, Gordon J. (1911). Horace: Odes and Epodes (Rev. ed.). Boston, MA: Benj. H. Sanborn & Co. pp. 207–8.
- Wickham, E. C. (1912). Horace. Vol. 1: The Odes, Carmen Saeculare and Epodes (New ed.). Oxford: Clarendon Press. p. 56.
