= Odes 1.5 =

Odes 1.5, also known as Ad Pyrrham ('To Pyrrha'), or by its incipit, Quis multa gracilis te puer in rosa, is one of the Odes of Horace. The poem is written in one of the Asclepiadic metres and is of uncertain date; not after 23 BC.

== Summary ==
To a coquette or flirt: What slender innocent youth enjoys your smiles to-day, and courts you, Pyrrha? (1–5) Alas, he does not yet suspect that you are fickle as the sea; your smile lures on his love to shipwreck (5–13). Thank Heaven I escaped betimes: in Neptune's temple I hang my dripping clothes as votive gift (13–16).

== The text ==
Quis multa gracilis te puer in rosa
perfusus liquidis urget odoribus
grato, Pyrrha, sub antro?
cui flavam religas comam,

simplex munditiis? Heu quotiens fidem 5
mutatosque deos flebit et aspera
nigris aequora ventis
emirabitur insolens,

qui nunc te fruitur credulus aurea,
qui semper vacuam, semper amabilem 10
sperat, nescius aurae
fallacis. Miseri, quibus

intemptata nites. Me tabula sacer
votiva paries indicat uvida
suspendisse potenti 15
vestimenta maris deo.

== Ambiguous Final Line ==
The last words of the ode, potenti ... maris deo 'to the god who has power over the sea' are found in the manuscripts and in the ancient commentator Porphyrio; nonetheless, Nisbet and Hubbard in their commentary (1970), following a conjecture of Zielinski (1901), suggest that the original reading may have been potenti ... maris deae 'to the goddess who has power over the sea', i.e. Venus. They compare Odes 3.26.4ff: barbiton hic paries habebit / laevum marinae qui Veneris latus / custodit 'this wall, which guards the left side of Venus of the Sea, will have my lyre', where in a similar way Horace's intention to give up love affairs is symbolised by his dedicating his lyre in the temple of Venus. They argue that Neptune has nothing to do with the metaphorical sea of love. They quote several parallels for this idea from Greek epigrammatists, such as one which reads 'if you save those who are in the sea, Cypris (another name for Venus), save me too, who am a shipwrecked man perishing on the land'. They admit that the vast majority of readers will prefer the manuscript reading, but add "Yet deae rounds of the ode perfectly with a continuation of the maritime metaphor which Horace has exploited so ingeniously."

However, it has been argued that even if deo is kept in the text, it may refer to Venus as well as to Neptune: Hoppin (1984) writes: "The masculine form does not exclude a female goddess, and the Greek amatory epigrams that play on the dual aspects of Aphrodite (goddess of love and of the sea) create a context which encourages Horace's readers to think of Venus here."

== Translations ==
Milton's version, published in his Poems of 1673, is well known:

What slender Youth bedew'd with liquid odours
Courts thee on Roses in some pleasant Cave,
Pyrrha for whom bindst thou
In wreaths thy golden Hair,

Plain in thy neatness; O how oft shall he
On Faith and changed Gods complain: and Seas
Rough with black winds and storms
Unwonted shall admire:

Who now enjoyes thee credulous, all Gold,
Who alwayes vacant, alwayes amiable
Hopes thee; of flattering gales
Unmindfull. Hapless they

To whom thou untry'd seem'st fair. Me in my vow'd
Picture the sacred wall declares t' have hung
My dank and dropping weeds
To the stern God of Sea.

There is also an imitation by Cowley, and one by La Fontaine. According to Clifford Herschel Moore, "The perfected simplicity of this ode can best be tested by an attempt to alter or transpose a word, or by translation. Even Milton's well-known version is inadequate."

== Bibliography ==
- Bowditch, P. Lowell (2011). "Horace and the Pyrrhatechnics of Translation". The Classical World. 104 (3): 355–62.
- Hoppin, Meredith Clarke (1984). "New Perspectives on Horace, Odes 1.5". The American Journal of Philology. 105 (1): 54–68. doi:10.2307/294626.
- Mason, H. A. (1976). "Horace's Ode to Pyrrha". The Cambridge Quarterly. 7 (1): 27–62.
- Nisbet, R. G. M.; Hubbard, M. (1970). A Commentary on Horace Odes Book 1, Oxford University Press, pp. 72–80.
- Storrs, Ronald (1959). Ad Pyrrham: A Polyglot Collection of Translations of Horace's Ode to Pyrrha. London: Oxford University Press.

Attribution:

- Bennett, Charles E. (1901). Horace: Odes and Epodes. Norwood, MA: Allyn and Bacon. p. 8.
- Moore, Clifford Herschel (1902). Horace: The Odes and Epodes and Carmen Saeculare. United States: American Book Company. pp. 71–3.
- Shorey, Paul; Laing, Gordon J. (1911). Horace: Odes and Epodes (Rev. ed.). Boston, MA: Benj. H. Sanborn & Co. pp. 160–1.
