= Recitationes =

Public readings of texts in ancient Rome

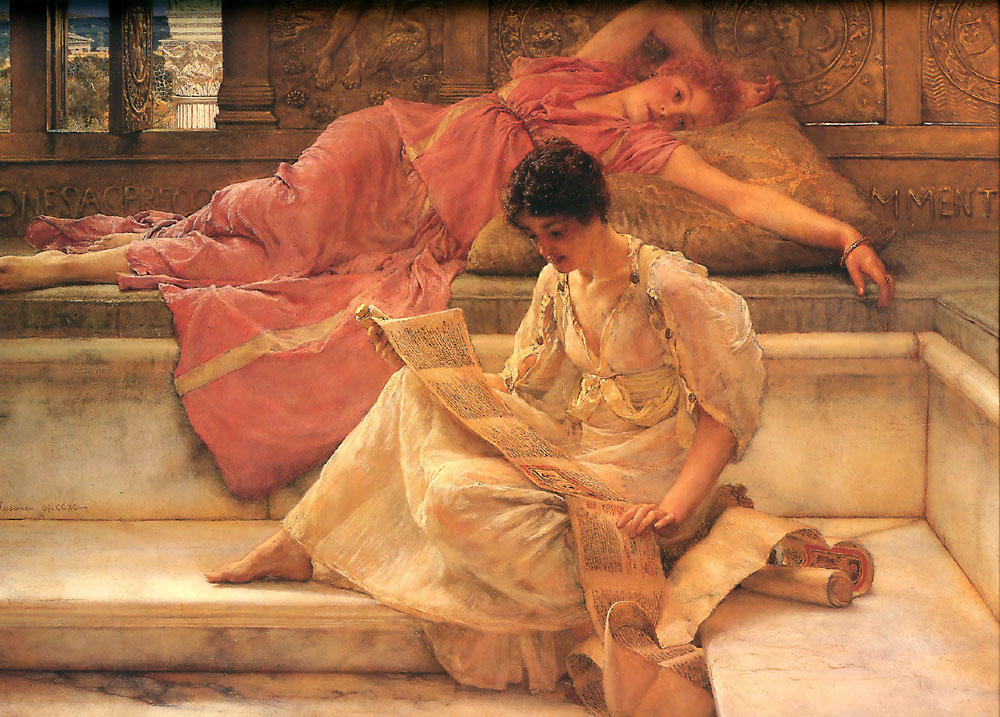
Recitation of a Roman woman, painting by Lawrence Alma-Tadema

Recitationes were a literary practice of ancient Rome that involved one or more public readings (recitatio, pl recitationes) of a text. Some of these occurred in public places (theaters and baths), and even in the Roman Forum.

== History ==
Before this public performance, authors would simply be known by their texts. These would be copied on scrolls by copyists, often freedmen of Greek origin, and were intended to be sold by these book publishers to wealthy people.

Starting towards the end of the Republic, the recitations developed substantially under the Empire, especially under the reign of Augustus, thanks to the poet and politician Gaius Asinius Pollio, who became well known because of the fashion for this new entertainment. The purpose of reading aloud in public was to make themselves known to an audience in order to obtain social and monetary protection; the recitations took place, for the most part, within privileged closed circles.

Each person reciting was the protégé of a patron. The purpose of a reader was to secure his career by being the protégé of the wealthiest of patrons. The patron, a politician or wealthy public figure, paid his artist and commissioned works in which the patron was thanked; the latter could even appear as one of the characters in the text read. The orders were often intended to reproduce Greek works in Latin and in the Roman fashion of the moment. This Latinization of Greek literature was explicit: most Roman citizens, and at least all those who attended the recitations, were bilingual and knew Greek perfectly, a language of commerce and literature. Thus, in the Eclogues, Virgil takes up the Greek topos of the dialogue between shepherds of Arcadia and builds from there a poem in Latin meter.

Horace, Virgil and Propertius were all famous authors of recitations. Some famous verses of the Odes of Horace make clear the stake of a recitatio: to erect an artistic monument as did the Greeks and by taking again the elements of their literature; to remain for posterity as one who will have settled in Rome a Latin literature reproducing the Greek literature.
