= Suffect =

A suffect (Latin: suffectus) is a substitute or replacement for a Roman magistrate who died in office. The most well-attested suffects are those of the consuls, who in the republican period were elected to fill vacancies if one of the consuls died. However, other magistracies could also have suffects, such as the plebeian tribunate.

In the case of the censorship, however, there was generally no suffect. In the early republic this was permitted. However, after the sack of the city by the Gauls in 387 BC occurred during a censorship with a suffect, a censor who found himself without colleague was required to resign and new censors were then elected.

== Suffect consulship ==
In the republican tradition, a consul (of which were two) was not required to fill a vacancy in the consular college if his colleague died. However, it was customary to do so and a consul would be pressured to do so unless the remainder of the term was minimal. If he chose to fill the vacancy, he would call elections which would return the suffect. A consul could choose to elect a colleague even if there was a minimal vacancy: Julius Caesar in 45 BC on the last day of the year found himself without colleague and then called an election to elect his friend Gaius Caninius Rebilus as consul for mere hours.

Already in 45 BC, Caesar had stepped down as consul ordinarius in place of two suffect consuls who, so rewarded for their loyalty, were intended to serve only from October through December. It was the death of one of the suffect consuls on the last year of December which allowed him to elect Rebilus. The events of 45 BC – both Rebilius' election for mere hours and the previous election suffects in place of consuls still able to serve – set the precedent, continued in the triumviral period and the empire, to reward loyal supporters of the dynasts by election to suffect consulships. Octavian's victory in the civil wars put a momentary stop to this process, which was probably seen by the public as irregular and contrary to tradition.

During the imperial period from AD 39, however, it again became customary for the consular pair who became consuls on 1 January to resign to make way for suffecti. The consuls who assumed office on 1 January, like their republican predecessors, were called the "ordinary" consuls and were the consuls used to date the year. Even the replacement suffecti would serve only a few months before also resigning to be replaced with a new pair. This system of rotation, which came common after AD 39, divided the consulship into two classes of honour: the ordinary consuls were of substantial prestige with their names also attached to the year; the many suffecti, however, continued to be largely obscure. The proliferation of suffect consulships through the empire led to their barely being recorded by the early fourth century AD.

== Bibliography ==
- Bagnall, Roger S; et al. (1987). Consuls of the later Roman Empire. Atlanta, GA: Scholars Press. ISBN 1-55540-099-X. LCCN 86-31452 – via Internet Archive.
- Broughton, Thomas Robert Shannon (1952). The magistrates of the Roman republic. Vol. 2. New York: American Philological Association.
- Lintott, Andrew W (1999). Constitution of the Roman Republic. Oxford: Clarendon Press. ISBN 978-0-19-815068-8 – via Internet Archive.
- Treves, Piero; Levick, Barbara (2012). "suffect, suffectio". Oxford Classical Dictionary (4th ed.). Oxford University Press. doi:10.1093/acrefore/9780199381135.013.6120.
- Pina Polo, Francisco (2018-05-07). "Magistrates without pedigree: the consules suffecti of the triumviral age". Journal of Roman Studies. 108: 99–114. doi:10.1017/s0075435818000278. ISSN 0075-4358.
