= Clifford Herschel Moore =

American Latin scholar

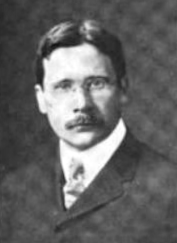
- Born: March 11, 1866; Sudbury, Massachusetts
- Died: August 31, 1931 (aged 65); Cambridge, Massachusetts
- Burial place: Mount Auburn Cemetery
- Education: Harvard College; Ludwig-Maximilians-Universität München
- Occupation: Academic
- Spouse: Lorena Leadbetter (m. 1890)

Clifford Herschel Moore (1866–1931) was an American Latin scholar.

== Biography ==
Clifford Herschel Moore was born in Sudbury, Massachusetts on March 11, 1866. He married Lorena Leadbetter on July 23, 1890.

He was educated at Harvard College (A.B., 1889) and in Europe at the Ludwig-Maximilians-Universität München (Ph.D., 1897). He taught classics in California (1889–92) and Massachusetts, at Phillips Academy in Andover (1892–94).

Moore then taught Latin at the University of Chicago (1894–98), and at Harvard from 1898 onward. He was a professor at the American School of Classical Studies in Rome, Italy.

Moore edited Frederic de Forest Allen's 1899 edition of Euripides' Medea and his 1902 edition Horace's Odes and Epodes (1902), and wrote the textbooks A First Latin Book (1903) and The Elements of Latin (1906).

Moore was elected to the American Academy of Arts and Sciences in 1910 and the American Philosophical Society in 1928.

He died at his home in Cambridge, Massachusetts on August 31, 1931. He was buried at Mount Auburn Cemetery.
