= Archilochian =

Greek and Latin poetic form

Archilochian or archilochean is a term used to describe several metres of Ancient Greek and Latin poetry. The name is derived from Archilochus, whose poetry first uses the rhythms.

== In Greek verse ==
=== Erasmonidean ===
In the analysis of Archaic and Classical Greek poetry, archilochian or archilochean usually describes the following length:

x – u u – u u – x | – u – u – x

(where "–" indicates a longum, "u" a breve, and "x" an anceps syllable). The alternative name erasmonideus or erasmonidean comes from Archilochus' fr. 168 (West):

Ἐρασμονίδη Χαρίλαε, | χρῆμά τοι γελοῖον
ἐρέω, πολὺ φίλταθ᾽ ἑταίρων, | τέρψεαι δ᾽ ἀκούων.

Erasmonídē Kharílae, | khrêmá toi geloîon
eréō, polù phíltath᾽ hetaírōn, | térpseai d᾽ akoúōn.

'Erasmonides Charilaos, I'm going to tell you an amusing thing,
most dearest of friends, and you will enjoy hearing it.'

As indicated, a caesura is observed before the ithyphallic (– u – u – –) ending of the verse. (Because of this, the name erasmonideus has sometimes been used to refer only to the colon x – u u – u u – x preceding the ithyphallic.)

The verse is also used stichically in Old Comedy, for example in Aristophanes, Wasps 1518-1537 (with irregular responsion) and in Cratinus fr. 360 (Kassel-Austin), where, as Hephaestion notes, no caesura is observed before the ithyphallic ending:

Χαῖρ᾽, ὦ μέγ᾽ ἀχρειόγελως ὅμιλε, ταῖς ἐπίβδαις,
τῆς ἡμετέρας σοφίας κριτὴς ἄριστε πάντων,
εὐδαίμον᾽ ἔτικτέ σε μήτηρ ἰκρίων ψόφησις.

Khaîr᾽, ô még᾽ akhreiógelōs hómile, taîs epíbdais,
tês hēmetéras sophías kritḕs áriste pántōn,
eudaímon᾽ étikté se mḗtēr ikríōn psóphēsis.

'Welcome, o foolishly-laughing crowd, to the post-festival days,
best of all critics of our wisdom,
your mother, the applause of the theatre-seats, bore you happy.'

The verse also occurs in the choral lyric of tragedy and comedy, with the same caesura as in the example from Archilochus, as a rule, for example in Aeschylus, Seven Against Thebes 756-7 ~ 764-5, Sophocles, Oedipus Rex 196-7 ~ 209-10, Euripides, Medea 989-90 ~ 996-7, Iphigenia in Tauris 403 ~ 417, and Aristophanes, Assemblywomen 580-1.

=== Another definition ===
The Byzantine metrician Trichas used the name archilocheion for the trochaic trimeter catalectic:

– u – x – u – x – u –,

This is seen in Archilochus, fr. 197 (West), and is used stichically by Callimachus, fr. 202 (Pfeiffer).

== In Latin verse ==
In Latin poetry, the term "archilochian" or "archilochean" is used to refer to a number of different metres, called the "1st, 2nd, 3rd, 4th archilochian". However, different authors disagree on the numbering. The description below follows Rudd (2004) and Raven (1965).

=== 1st archilochian stanza ===
(= Nisbet & Hubbard's 2nd archilochian)

The first archilochian stanza consists of a dactylic hexameter followed by a dactylic hemiepes:

– u u – u u – u u – u u – u u – x
– u u – u u x

An example is Horace, Odes 4.7, praised by A. E. Housman in a lecture in 1914 as "the most beautiful poem in Latin literature":

diffūgēre nivēs, redeunt iam grāmina campīs
arboribusque comae

'The snows have fled away, and grass is now returning to the plains
and leaves to the trees'

The above metre is called the "2nd Archilochian" by Nisbet & Hubbard (1970), who use "1st Archilochian" as another name for the Alcmanian (or Alcmanic) strophe, which consists of a dactylic hexameter followed by a dactylic tetrameter.

=== 2nd archilochian stanza ===
A dactylic hexameter, followed by an iambic dimeter + dactylic hemiepes:

– u u – u u – u u – u u – u u – x
x – u – x – u x | – u u – u u x

An example is Horace, Epodes 13:

horrida tempestās caelum contraxit et imbrēs
nivēsque dēdūcunt Iovem; nunc mare nunc siluae

'A dreadful storm has contracted the sky, and rain showers
and snows are drawing down Jupiter; now the sea, now the forests...'

=== 3rd archilochian stanza ===
An iambic trimeter, followed by a dactylic hemiepes + an iambic dimeter (the second line is known as an 'elegiambus'):

x – u – x – u – x – u x
– u u – u u x | x – u – x – u x

This is found in Horace, Epodes 11:

Pettī, nihil mē sīcut anteā iuvat
scrībere versiculōs amōre percussum gravī

'Pettius, it does not please me at all as in the past
to write little verses smitten by a serious love'

cf. Archilochus fr. 196 (West)

=== 4th archilochian stanza ===
(= Nisbet & Hubbard's 3rd archilochian)

A dactylic tetrameter + ithyphallic (3 trochees), followed by an iambic trimeter catalectic:

– u u – u u – u u – u u | – u – u – x
x – u – x | – u – u – x

(The first of these lines is known as the "greater archilochian".)

An example is Horace, Odes 1.4:

Solvitur ācris hiēms grātā vice | vēris et Favōnī
trahuntque siccās | māchinae carīnās,
ac neque iam stabulīs gaudet pecus | aut arātor ignī
nec prāta cānīs | albicant pruīnīs.

'Harsh winter is being loosened with a welcome change of spring and the West Wind;
and machines are dragging the dry keels (to the shore);
the cattle no longer rejoice in their stable or the ploughman in his fire;
nor are the meadows white with hoar frost.'

The metre's name reflects the precedent in Archilochus, for example, fr. 188 (West).

=== 1st pythiambic ===
Two other similar metrical couplets imitated from Archilochus combining dactylic and iambic metra are known as the 1st and 2nd pythiambic. The 1st pythiambic combines a dactylic hexameter with an iambic dimeter:

– u u – u u – u u – u u – u u – x
x – u – x – u x

This is found in Horace, Epodes 15 and 16. The following is the opening of Epode 15:

nox erat et caelō fulgēbat lūna serēnō
inter minōra sīdera

'It was night and the moon was shining in a clear sky
amidst the lesser stars'

=== 2nd pythiambic ===
The 2nd pythiambic combines a dactylic hexameter with an ionic trimeter. In Horace's Epode 16 the trimeter is "pure", that is, every anceps position is a short syllable:

– u u – u u – u u – u u – u u – x
u – u – u – u – u – u x

altera iam teritur bellīs cīvīlibus aetās
suīs et ipsa Rōma vīribus ruit

'Another generation is now being worn away by civil wars,
and Rome is being ruined by its own strength'

== Bibliography ==
- Nisbet, R. G. M.; Hubbard, M. (1970). A Commentary on Horace Odes Book 1. Oxford.
- Raven, D. S. (1962), Greek Metre. Faber & Faber.
- Raven, D. S. (1965). Latin Metre. Faber & Faber.
- Rudd, N. (2004). Horace Odes and Epodes. Loeb Classical Library 33, pp. 14–15.
- West, M. L. (1982). Greek Metre. Oxford.
- West, M. L. (1987). An Introduction to Greek Metre. Oxford.
