= Odes (Horace) =

Latin poetry collection

The Odes (Latin: Carmina) are a collection in four books of Latin lyric poems by Horace. The Horatian ode format and style has been emulated since by other poets. Books 1 to 3 were published in 23 BC. A fourth book, consisting of 15 poems, was published in 13 BC.

The Odes were developed as a conscious imitation of the short lyric poetry of Greek originals – Pindar, Sappho and Alcaeus are some of Horace's models. His genius lay in applying these older forms to the social life of Rome in the age of Augustus. The Odes cover a range of subjects – love; friendship; wine; religion; morality; patriotism; poems of eulogy addressed to Augustus and his relations; and verses written on a miscellany of subjects and incidents, including the uncertainty of life, the cultivation of tranquility and contentment, and the observance of moderation or the "golden mean."

The Odes have been considered traditionally by English-speaking scholars as purely literary works. Recent evidence by a Horatian scholar suggests they may have been intended as performance art, a Latin re-interpretation of Greek lyric song. The Roman writer Petronius, writing less than a century after Horace's death, remarked on the curiosa felicitas (studied spontaneity) of the Odes (Satyricon 118). The English poet Alfred Tennyson declared that the Odes provided "jewels five-words long, that on the stretched forefinger of all Time / Sparkle for ever" (The Princess, part II, l.355).

== Summary ==
The four books of odes contain 103 poems in total (104 if the Carmen Saeculare is included). They are not all of equal length. Books 1, 2, 3, and 4 have 876 lines, 572 lines, 1004 lines, and 582 lines respectively. (The Carmen Saeculare has 76 lines.) The number of poems in each book is 38, 20, 30, and 15. The odes range from 8 lines to 80 lines in length, the average being about 30 lines.

=== Book 1 ===
Book 1 consists of 38 poems. The opening sequence of nine poems are all in a different metre, with a tenth metre appearing in 1.11. It has been suggested that poems 1.12–1.18 form a second parade, this time of allusions to or imitations of a variety of Greek lyric poets: Pindar in 1.12, Sappho in 1.13, Alcaeus in 1.14, Bacchylides in 1.15, Stesichorus in 1.16, Anacreon in 1.17, and Alcaeus again in 1.18. The book contains many well-known phrases, such as nunc est bibendum (1.37.1), carpe diem (1.11.8), and nil desperandum (1.7.27).

The poems can be summarised as follows:

I.1, Maecenas atavis edite regibus... – Dedication of the First Three Books of the Odes to Maecenas (Horace's Patron) –
Every man is governed by his ruling passion: the Olympian charioteer, the politician, the trader, the husbandman, the merchant, the man of pleasure, the soldier, and the hunter. To win the title of a lyric poet is all that Horace desires.

I.2, Iam satis terris nivis atque dirae... – To Octavian, The Deliverer and Hope of the State –
The subject of this ode is the overflowing of the Tiber, which recalls to the poet the flood of Deucalion. He imagines that the disaster is caused by the wrath of Ilia (the wife of Tiber), the civil wars, and the assassination of Julius Caesar. Octavian, as Mercury in human shape, is invoked to save the empire.

I.3, Sic te diva potens Cypri... – To Virgil, Setting Out for Greece –
The ode begins with a prayer for the safe voyage of Virgil to Athens, which suggests the daring of the earliest mariners and the boldness of men in overcoming difficulties set by Nature.

I.4, Solvitur acris hiems... – A Hymn to Springtime –
The changing season warns us of the shortness of life. Horace urges his friend Sestius – vitae summa brevis spem nos vetat incohare longam (The brief sum of life forbids us cling to far-off hope).

I.5, Quis multa gracilis te puer in rosa... – To the flirt Pyrrha, who is as faithless as the winds or seas, and whose fancy no lover can hold onto. (See Odes 1.5.)

I.6, Scribēris Vario fortis et hostium victor... – Horace pleads his inability to worthily sing the praises of M. Vipsanius Agrippa, the distinguished Roman Commander.

I.7, Laudabunt alii claram Rhodon aut Mytilenen... – Fairest of Spots, O Plancus, is Tibur – There, or wherever you may be, drown your cares in wine.

I.8, Lydia, dic, per omnis te deos oro... – To Lydia, who has transformed Sybaris from a hardy athlete into a doting lover.

I.9, Vides ut alta stet nive candidum... – Winter Without Bids Us Make Merry Within (Soracte) –
(with borrowing from an original by Alcaeus) – To Thaliarchus. The snow is deep and the frost is keen – Pile high the hearth and bring out old wine – Leave all else to the gods.

I.10, Mercuri, facunde nepos Atlantis... – Hymn to Mercury –
Mercury is addressed as the god of eloquence and the promoter of the civilization of man; as the messenger of the gods and the inventor of the lyre; skilled in craft and cunning; and the conductor of souls to the Underworld.

I.11, Tu ne quaesieris... – Carpe Diem! –
The poet seeks to dissuade Leuconoe from giving heed to the false arts of astrologers and diviners. It is vain to inquire into the future – Let us enjoy the present, for this is all we can command. It closes with the famous line: carpe diem, quam minimum credula postero (Seize the day, trusting tomorrow as little as possible).

I.12, Quem virum aut heroa lyra... – The Praises of Octavian –
The poet praises Octavian by associating him with gods and heroes, and distinguished Romans of earlier days.

I.13, Cum tu, Lydia... – Jealousy –
Addressed to Lydia – The poet contrasts the misery of jealousy with the happiness secured by constancy in love.

I.14, O navis, referent in mare te novi fluctus... – The Ship of State –
Horace refers to a period during which the Roman state was tossed and nearly wrecked by perpetual storms. He exhorts it to beware of fresh perils and keep safely in harbor.

I.15, Pastor cum traheret... – The Prophecy of Nereus –
As Paris hurries from Sparta to Troy with Helen, Nereus stills the winds and prophesies – Ilium's doom is inevitable.

I.16, O matre pulchra filia pulchrior... – An Apology –
The poet has offended some lady by the intemperate utterances of his verse; he now seeks forgiveness for the fault. He describes the sad effects of unbridled anger, and urges her to restrain hers.

I.17, Velox amoenum saepe Lucretilem... – An Invitation to Tyndaris to Enjoy the Delights of the Country –
Horace invites Tyndaris to his Sabine farm, and describes the air of tranquility and security there, blessed as it is with favoring protection of Faunus and the rural deities.

I.18, Nullam, Vare, sacra vite prius severis arborem... – The Praise of Wine, and the ill effects of intemperance.

I.19, Mater saeva Cupidinum... – The Poet's Love for Glycera

I.20, Vile potabis modicis Sabinum cantharis... – An Invitation to Maecenas –
You will drink poor Sabine wine in modest bowls when you visit the poet.

I.21, Dianam tenerae dicite virgines... – Hymn to Diana and Apollo and their mother Latona

I.22, Integer vitae scelerisque purus... – Upright of Life and Free from Wickedness –
Addressed to Aristius Fuscus – Begins as a solemn praise of honest living and ends in a mock-heroic song of love for sweetly laughing "Lalage" (cf. II.5.16, Propertius IV.7.45).

I.23, Vitas inuleo me similis, Chloë... – Fear Me Not, Chloe, and do not shun me. (See Odes 1.23.)

I.24, Quis desiderio sit pudor aut modus... – To Virgil – A Lament for the Death of Quintilius

I.25, Parcius iunctas quatiunt fenestras... – Lydia, Thy Charms Are Past –
Horace taunts Lydia with her approaching old age and her lack of admirers.

I.26, Musis amicus tristitiam et metus tradam... – In Praise of Aelius Lamia –
The poet bids the Muses to inspire him to sing the praises of Aelius Lamia, a man distinguished for his exploits in war.

I.27, Natis in usum laetitiae scyphis... – Let Moderation Reign –
At a wine party, Horace endeavors to restrain his quarrelsome companions – He asks the brother of Megilla of Opus to confide the object of his affections.

I.28, Te maris et terrae numeroque... – Death, The Doom of All –
An unburied corpse first addresses the deceased philosopher Archytas with some philosophical reflections, then requests a passing merchant to stop and bury him.

I.29, Icci, beatis nunc Arabum invides... – The Scholar Turned Adventurer –
A remonstrance addressed to Iccius on his intention of giving up philosophy and of joining the expedition to Arabia Felix.

I.30, O Venus, regina Cnidi Paphique... – A Prayer to Venus –
Venus is invoked to abandon for a while her beloved Cyprus, and to honor with her presence the temple prepared for her at the home of Glycera.

I.31, Quid dedicatum poscit Apollinem vates?... – Prayer to Apollo on the consecration of his temple.

I.32, Poscimus, si quid vacui sub umbra... – Invocation to the Lyre –
The poet addresses his lyre, and blends with the address the praises of the Greek poet Alcaeus.

I.33, Albi, ne doleas plus nimio memor... – The Faithless Glycera –
A consolation to the contemporary poet Tibullus over a lost love.

I.34, Parcus deorum cultor et infrequens... – The Poet's Conversion from Error –
After hearing thunder in a cloudless sky, Horace renounces his former error and declares his belief in Jupiter, Fortuna, and the superintending providence of the gods.

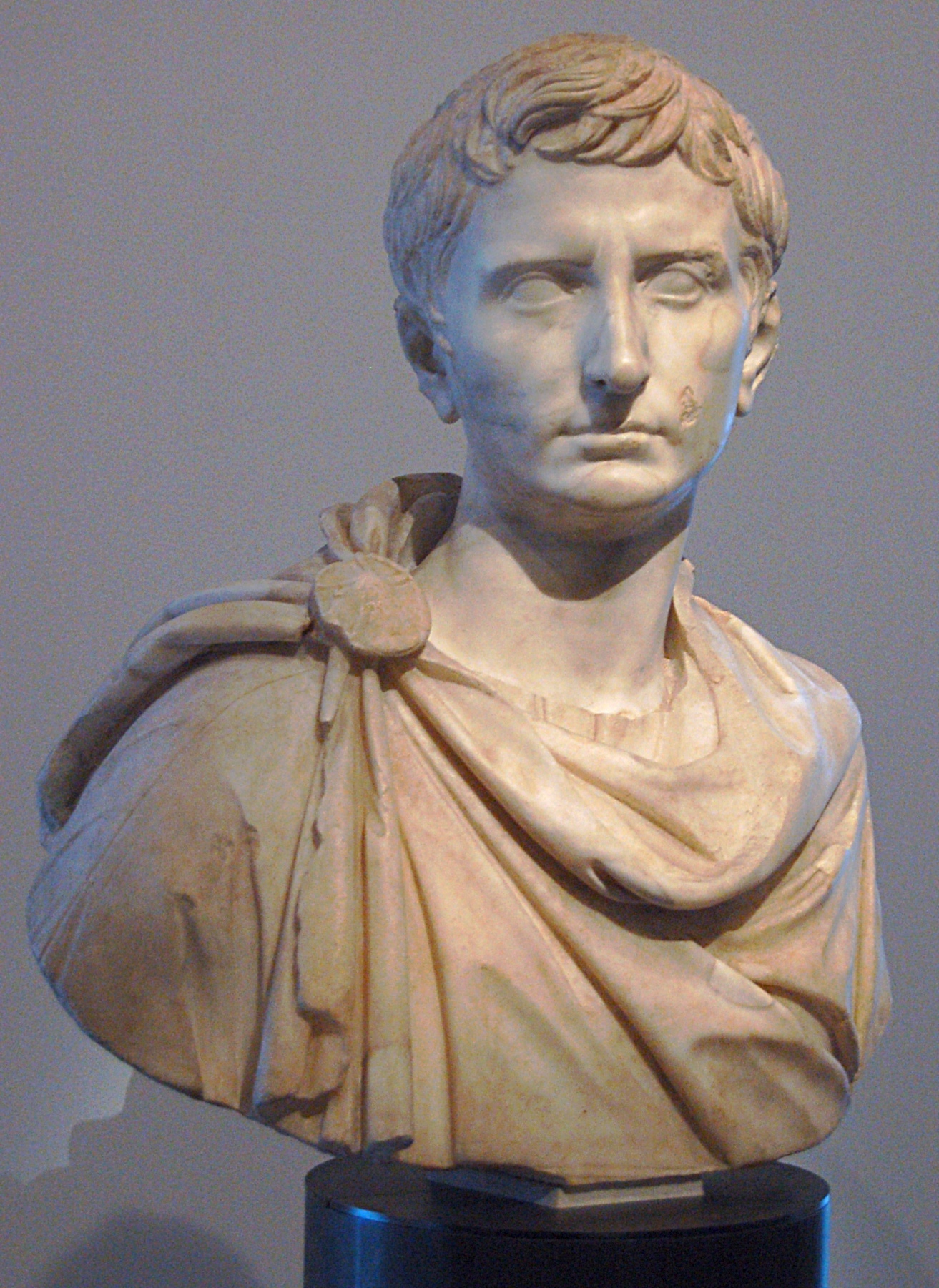
A bust of Octavian, dated c. 30 BC. Capitoline Museums, Rome

I.35, O diva, gratum quae regis Antium... – Hymn to Fortuna –
The poet invokes Fortune as an all-powerful goddess. He implores her to preserve Octavian in his distant expeditions, and to save the state from ruinous civil wars.

I.36, Et ture et fidibus iuvat – An Ode of Congratulation to Plotius Numida, on his safe return from Spain, where he had been serving under Octavian in a war against the Cantabrians.

I.37, Nunc est bibendum... – Now Is the Time to Drink! –
An ode for Octavian's victory at Actium, the capture of Alexandria, and the death of Cleopatra (30 BC). The poem's tone over the fallen queen is tempered by a tribute to her pride and courage.

I.38, Persicos odi, puer, apparatus... – Away With Oriental Luxury! –
Horace directs his servant to make the simplest preparations for his entertainment.

=== Book 2 ===
Book 2 consists of 20 poems. This book is noticeably different in style from book 1: the great variety of metres of book 1 has gone: instead, all but two of the odes are either Alcaic or Sapphic. The odes are a little longer on average than those in book 1: only one ode has less than 6 stanzas, compared with 24 in book 1; also there are no odes longer than 10 stanzas, a contrast with book 3, where 10 of the odes are longer. The poems seem carefully arranged: the first and last are addressed respectively to Pollio and Maecenas (Horace's two patrons), and the two central odes (10 and 11) are addressed to Lucius Licinius Varro Murena, who was Maecenas's brother-in-law, and a certain Quinctius, who may have been Pollio's brother-in-law. 13 of the 20 poems are addressed to living individuals, a higher proportion than in books 1 and 3. In many of them Horace gives advice drawn from different philosophical schools.

II.1, Motum ex Metello consule civicum... – To Asinius Pollio, the writer of tragedy, who is now composing a history of the civil wars. A lament for the carnage caused by the conflicts of the Romans with their fellow-citizens.

II.2, Nullus argento color est avaris... – The Wise Use of Money –
To Sallustius Crispus (nephew of the historian Sallust). The love of gain grows by self-indulgence. The moderate man is the genuine king.

II.3, Aequam memento rebus in arduis... – The Wisdom of Moderation, The Certainty of Death –
To Quintus Dellius. Let us enjoy our life while we may, for death will soon strip us all alike of our possessions.

II.4, Ne sit ancillae tibi amor pudori... – To Xanthias Phoceus – Horace encourages his friend on his love for Phyllis, his slave.

II.5, Nondum subacta ferre iugum valet... – Not Yet! –
The beautiful Lalage is still too young to return his passion – Soon it will be otherwise.

II.6, Septimi, Gadis aditure mecum et... – Fairest of All is Tibur – Yet Tarentum, Too, Is Fair –
To Horace's friend, the Roman knight Septimius, who would go with him to the ends of the earth. The poet prays that Tibur may be the resting-place of his old age; or, if that may not be, he will choose the country which lies around Tarentum.

II.7, O saepe mecum tempus in ultimum... – A Joyful Return –
An ode of congratulation to Pompeius Varus, once the poet's comrade in the army of Brutus, on his restoration to civil rights.

II.8, Ulla si iuris tibi peierati... – The Baleful Charms of Barine –
On the courtesan Barine's utter faithlessness, which Heaven will not punish – Indeed, her beauty and fascination are ever-increasing. She brings dread to mothers, fathers, and wives.

II.9, Non semper imbres nubibus hispidos... – A Truce to Sorrow, Valgius! –
To Gaius Valgius Rufus on the death of a boy called Mystes. Since all troubles have their natural end, do not mourn overmuch. Rather let us celebrate the latest victories of Augustus.

II.10, Rectius vives, Licini, neque altum... – The Golden Mean –
To Lucius Licinius Varro Murena. The moderate life is the perfect life.

II.11, Quid bellicosus Cantaber et Scythes... – Enjoy Life Wisely! –
Horace in a half-playful tone advises his friend Quinctius Hirpinus to enjoy life wisely, and not to fret.

II.12, Nolis longa ferae bella Numantiae... – The Charms of Licymnia –
Horace pleads the unfitness of his lyric poetry to record the wars of the Romans or the battles of mythology. He advises Maecenas to write in prose the history of Caesar's campaigns, while he himself will sing the praises of Licymnia (some commentators say that Licymnia was another name for Terentia, the wife of Maecenas).

II.13, Ille et nefasto te posuit die... – A Narrow Escape –
This ode owes its origin to Horace's narrow escape from sudden death by the falling of a tree on his Sabine estate. (This same event is also alluded to in Odes, II.17 line 28 and III.4 line 27.) After expressing his indignation against the person who planted the tree, he passes to a general reflection on the uncertainty of life and the realms of dark Proserpine.

II.14, Eheu fugaces, Postume, Postume... – Death is Inevitable –
Addressed to Postumus, a rich friend. Nothing can stay the advance of decay and death, the common doom of all on earth. Men pile up wealth, only for another to waste it.

II.15, Iam pauca aratro iugera regiae... – Against Luxury –
Horace describes the extravagant luxury prevalent among the rich, and praises the simplicity and frugality of the old Romans.

II.16, Otium divos rogat in patenti... – Contentment With Our Lot the Only True Happiness –
All men long for repose, which riches cannot buy. Contentment, not wealth, makes genuine happiness.

II.17, Cur me querellis exanimas tuis?... – To Maecenas on His Recovery from Illness –
Horace says that the same day must of necessity bring death to them both – Their horoscopes are wonderfully alike and they have both been saved from extreme peril.

II.18, Non ebur neque aureum... – The Vanity of Riches –
The poet, content with his own moderate fortune, inveighs against the blindness of avarice – for the same end awaits all men.

II.19, Bacchum in remotis carmina rupibus... – Hymn to Bacchus –
The poet celebrates Bacchus as all-powerful, all-conquering, and lord of creation; whom the earth, the sea and all nature obey; to whom men are subject, and the giants and the monsters of Orcus are all brought low.

II.20, Non usitata nec tenui ferar... – The Poet Prophesies His Own Immortality –
Transformed into a swan, the poet will soar away from the abodes of men, nor will he need the empty honors of a tomb.

=== Book 3 ===
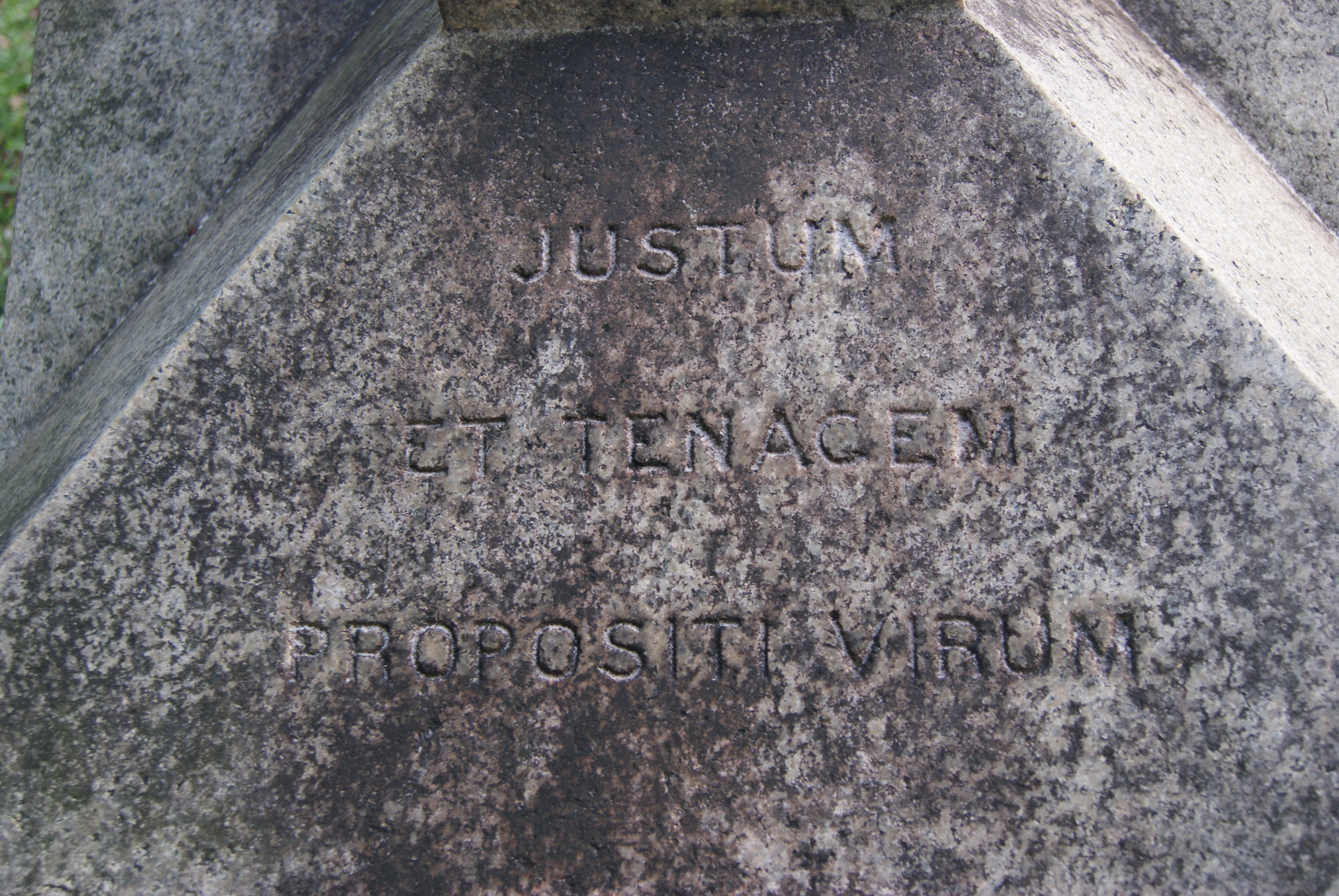
Justum et tenacem propositi virum – "a man just and steadfast in purpose", from Horace's Odes, III.3, on the gravestone of Elliot Charles Bovill, Chief Justice of the Straits Settlements, in Fort Canning Green, Singapore

The ancient editor Porphyrion read the first six odes of this book as a single sequence, one unified by a common moral purpose and addressed to all patriotic citizens of Rome. These six "Roman odes", as they have since been called (by H.T. Plüss in 1882), share a common metre and take as a common theme the glorification of Roman virtues and the attendant glory of Rome under Augustus. Ode III.2 contains the famous line Dulce et decorum est pro patria mori ("It is sweet and honorable to die for one's country"). Ode III.5 Caelo tonantem credidimus Jovem makes explicit identification of Augustus as a new Jove destined to restore in modern Rome the valor of past Roman heroes like Marcus Atilius Regulus, whose story occupies the second half of the poem.

Book 3 consists of 30 poems.

III.1, Odi profanum vulgus et arceo... – On Happiness –
Philosophy is a mystery which the uninitiated crowd cannot understand. The worthlessness of riches and rank. The praise of contentment. Care cannot be banished by change of scene.

III.2, Angustam amice pauperiem pati... – On Virtue –
Horace extols the virtue of endurance and valor in fighting for one's country, of integrity in politics, and of religious honor.

III.3, Iustum et tenacem propositi virum... – On Integrity and Perseverance –
The merit of integrity and resolution: the examples of Pollux, Hercules and Romulus. Juno's speech to the gods on the destiny of Rome.

III.4, Descende caelo et dic age tibia... – On Wise Counsel and Clemency –
The Muses have guarded and given counsel to Horace since his youth. They also do so to Augustus, and prompt him to clemency and kindness. The evils of violence and arrogance, on the other hand, are exemplified by the Titans and Giants, and others.

III.5, Caelo tonantem credidimus Iovem... – To Augustus – On Virtue and Fortitude –
Augustus will be recognized as a god on earth for his subjugation of the Britons and Parthians. The disgraceful actions of Crassus's troops (who married Parthians after being taken prisoner) are contrasted by the noble example of Regulus (who was released from Carthage to negotiate a peace, but dissuaded the Senate, and then returned to Carthage to be tortured to death).

III.6, Delicta maiorum inmeritus lues... – Piety & Chastity – Return to the Old Morals! –
Horace condemns the prevailing domestic immorality and contempt of the institutions of religion, and earnestly urges a speedy return to the simpler and purer manners of ancient times.

III.7, Quid fles, Asterie, quem tibi candidi... – Constancy, Asterie! –
Horace consoles Asterie on the absence of her lover Gyges, and warns her not to be unfaithful to her own vows.

III.8, Martis caelebs quid agam Kalendis... – A Happy Anniversary –
Horace invites Maecenas to celebrate with him the festival of the Calends of March (the Feast of the Matrons), which was also the anniversary of his narrow escape from sudden death by a falling tree.

III.9, Donec gratus eram tibi... – The Reconciliation of Two Lovers –
Often referred to as an "Amoebaean" ode (from the Greek αμείβω – to exchange), it describes, in graceful dialogue, a quarrel between two lovers and their reconciliation.

III.10, Extremum Tanain si biberes, Lyce... – A Lover's Complaint –
Horace warns Lyce that he cannot put up with her unkindness forever.

III.11, Mercuri, – nam te docilis magistro... – Take Warning, Lyde, from the Danaids! –
To Mercury – Horace begs the god to teach him such melody as will overcome the unkindness of Lyde. The ode concludes with the tale of the daughters of Danaus, and their doom in the underworld.

III.12, Miserarum est neque amori dare ludum... – Unhappy Neobule –
Joyless is the life of Neobule, ever under the watchful eye of a strict guardian. Only thoughts of handsome Hebrus take her mind off her troubles.

III.13, O fons Bandusiae splendidior vitro... – O, Fountain of Bandusia! –
Tomorrow a sacrifice will be offered to the fountain of Bandusia, whose refreshing coolness is offered to the flocks and herds, and which is now immortalized in verse.

III.14, Herculis ritu modo dictus, o plebs... – The Return of Augustus –
Horace proclaims a festal day on the return of Augustus from Spain (c. 24 BC), where he had reduced to subjection the fierce Cantabri.

III.15, Uxor pauperis Ibyci... – Chloris, Act Your Age! –
Horace taunts Chloris with her attempts to appear young, and with her frivolous life, while she is really an old woman.

III.16, Inclusam Danaen turris aenea... – Contentment is Genuine Wealth –
Gold is all-powerful, but its possession brings care and restlessness. True contentment is to be satisfied with little, as Horace is with his Sabine farm.

III.17, Aeli vetusto nobilis ab Lamo... – Prepare for Storms Tomorrow –
To Aelius Lamia – The crow foretells a stormy day tomorrow – Gather some firewood while you may, and spend the day in festivity.

III.18, Faune, Nympharum fugientum amator... – Hymn to Faunus –
Horace asks Faunus to bless his flocks and fields, for when Faunus is near, the whole countryside is glad.

III.19, Quantum distet ab Inacho... – Invitation to a Banquet –
Horace invites Telephus to give up for a time his historical researches, and join him at a banquet in honor of Murena.

III.20, Non vides quanto moveas periclo... – The Rivals –
Horace humorously describes a contest between Pyrrhus and some maiden for the exclusive regards of Nearchus.

III.21, O nata mecum consule Manlio... – To a Wine-Jar –
Horace, preparing to entertain his friend the orator Marcus Valerius Messalla Corvinus, sings of the manifold virtues of wine.

III.22, Montium custos nemorumque virgo – To Diana –
Horace dedicates a pine tree to Diana, and vows to the goddess a yearly sacrifice.

III.23, Caelo supinas si tuleris manus – Humble Sacrifices Devoutly Offered –
Horace assures the rustic Phidyle that the favor of the gods is gained not by costly offerings, but simple sacrifices such as salted meal offered with true feeling.

III.24, Intactis opulentior... – The Curse of Mammon –
Boundless riches cannot banish fear or avert death. A simple life like that of the Scythians is the healthiest and best. Stringent laws are needed to curb the present luxury and licentiousness.

III.25, Quo me, Bacche, rapis tui... – To Bacchus in Honor of Augustus –
Horace fancies himself carried along by Bacchus amid woods and wilds to celebrate, in some distant cave, the praises of Augustus.

III.26, Vixi puellis nuper idoneus... – Love's Triumphs Are Ended –
Scorned by the haughty Chloe, the poet, like a discharged soldier, abandons the arms of love. But he begs of Venus, as a last request, that his slighted love may not go unavenged.

III.27, Impios parrae recinentis omen... – Galatea, Beware! –
Addressed to Galatea, whom the poet wishes well on a voyage she is about to make across the stormy Adriatic Sea. He bids her to beware – for it was through lack of caution that Europa was carried away across the sea. It has been argued that the poem is allegorical: one suggestion is that Galatea is a girl about to embark on the stormy seas of love; another is that there is a reference to the Roman province of Galatia, which became part of the Roman Empire in 25 BC. It has also been noted that Horace develops the story of Europa as if she were a heroine in a tragic drama.

III.28, Festo quid potius die... – In Neptune's Honor –
An invitation to Lyde to visit the poet on the festival of Neptune, and join him in wine and song.

III.29, Tyrrhena regum progenies, tibi... – Invitation to Maecenas –
Horace invites Maecenas to leave the smoke and wealth and bustle of Rome, and come to visit him on his Sabine farm. He bids him to remember that we must live wisely and well in the present, as the future is uncertain.

III.30, Exegi monumentum aere perennius... – The Poet's Immortal Fame –
In this closing poem, Horace confidently predicts his enduring fame as the first and greatest of the lyric poets of Rome. He asserts: Exēgī monument(um) aere perennius (I have raised a monument more permanent than bronze).

=== Book 4 ===
Horace published a fourth book of Odes in 13 BC consisting of 15 poems. Horace acknowledged the gap in time with the first words of the opening poem of the collection: Intermissa, Venus, diū / rūrsus bella movēs (Venus, you return to battles long interrupted).

IV.1, Intermissa, Venus, diu... – Venus, Forbear! –
Horace complains that in advancing age he is vexed with new desires by the cruel goddess of love. He bids her to turn to a more youthful and worthy subject, his friend Paulus Maximus. But why is he, Horace, pining for the handsome Ligurinus?

IV.2, Pindarum quisquis studet aemulari... – Not for Me to Sing of Augustus! –
Horace was asked by Iulus Antonius (the son of Mark Antony and stepson of Augustus' sister Octavia) to sing of Augustus' victories in a Pindaric ode. Horace declines, alleging lack of talent, and requests Iulus to compose the poem himself.

IV.3, Quem tu, Melpomene, semel... – To Melpomene, Muse of Lyric Poetry –
To the Muse Melpomene Horace ascribes his poetic inspiration and the honors which he enjoys as the lyric poet of Rome.

IV.4, Qualem ministrum fulminis alitem... – In Praise of Drusus, the Younger Stepson of Augustus –
(A companion to Ode IV.14, which praises Tiberius). This ode praises Drusus, the younger son of the Empress Livia, on his victory over the Raeti and Vindelici. His stepfather Augustus is praised as having trained him to greatness. A speech of Hannibal about Rome's resilience is also included.

IV.5, Divis orte bonis, optume Romulae... – Augustus, Return! –
Horace begs Augustus to return to Rome, and describes the peace and good order of the principate under his reign.

IV.6, Dive, quem proles Niobaea magnae... – Invocation to Apollo –
In the year 17 BC, Augustus commissioned Horace to write the Carmen Saeculare, a hymn to be sung at the Saecular festival. This ode is an invocation to Apollo, begging help and inspiration for this important task.

IV.7, Diffugere nives, redeunt iam... – The Lesson of Spring's Return –
An ode on the same springtime theme as I.4 – Addressed to his friend Torquatus. Though the earth renews itself, and the waning moon waxes afresh, yet death is the ending of human life. Let us then make the best of our days while they last.

IV.8, Donarem pateras grataque commodus... – In Praise of Poetry –
This ode was written to C. Marcius Censorinus and probably sent as a Saturnalian gift. Horace would give bronze vases, or tripods, or gems of Grecian art, but he does not have these. What he has to give instead is the immortality of a poem. (The ode contains the line (28) dignum laude virum Mūsa vetat morī 'A man worthy of praise the Muse does not allow to die'.)

IV.9, Ne forte credas interitura quae... – In Praise of Lollius –
As in IV.8, Horace promises immortality through his verses, this time to Lollius, a man of wisdom and integrity.

IV.10, O crudelis adhuc et Veneris... – Beauty Is Fleeting –
An ode to a beautiful boy, Ligurinus, and the inevitability of old age.

IV.11, Est mihi nonum superantis annum... – A Joyous Birthday –
An invitation to Phyllis to celebrate the birthday of Maecenas at Horace's Sabine farm.

IV.12, Iam veris comites... – The Delights of Spring –
Addressed to Virgil (although not necessarily the poet, who died in 19 BC). The breezes and birds have returned – An invitation to a feast of Spring – The poet agrees to supply some fine wine, if Virgil will bring a jar of perfume.

IV.13, Audivere, Lyce, di mea vota... – Retribution –
Horace taunts Lyce, now growing old, on her desperate attempts to seem young and fascinating.

IV.14, Quae cura patrum quaeve Quiritium... – In Praise of Tiberius, the Elder Stepson of Augustus –
(A companion to Ode IV.4, which praises Drusus.) Horace honors the courage and exploits of Tiberius, the elder son of the empress Livia, on his victories over the tribes of the Raetian Alps. He then praises Augustus, whom he extols as the glory of the war, the defense of Roman and Italy, and as the undisputed ruler of the world.

IV.15, Phoebus volentem proelia me loqui... – The Praises of Augustus –
Horace records in song the victories of Augustus – Peace, good order, the establishment of public morals, the extended glory of the Roman name abroad, and security and happiness at home.

== Date of composition ==
=== Developments of style ===
In their commentary on Odes book 1, Nisbet and Hubbard (1970) observe certain developments in the style of Horace's Alcaics across the four books. These include, for example:

- a gradual decrease in the percentage of short first syllables in the first three lines of the stanza (7.2% in book 1, 3.1% in book 2, 2.0% in book 3, and 0% in book 4).
- a much larger proportion of polysyllable + disyllable endings (e.g. fātālis incestusque iūdex) in the 3rd line of the stanza in books 3 and 4: 5.0%, 5.8%, 24.6%, 30.2% respectively.
- the complete avoidance of quadrisyllabic or double disyllabic endings (e.g. nōdō coercēs vīperīnō or prōnōs relābī posse rīvōs) in the 3rd line of the stanza in books 3 and 4.
- the gradual decrease in the number of 4th lines beginning with a dactylic word (e.g. torquibus exiguīs renīdet): 35.0%, 22.1%, 17.8%, 13.2% respectively.

From these observations Nisbet and Hubbard deduce that the odes in books 1 to 3 are probably arranged roughly in order of composition, though they do not rule out that some of the poems in book 1 might be comparatively late. They add, however, that the use of lines of the type fātālis incestusque iūdex may not by itself be indicative of a late date, since such lines are associated with a grandiloquent style: in book 3, for example, there are 21 such lines in the six Roman Odes (3.1–6), but none in the slighter 3.17, 3.21, 3.23.

G. O. Hutchinson (2002) looks at several other stylistic features which support the view that the books were written in sequence. One is the decreasing use of atque 'and' pronounced as two syllables. In the four books of Odes, it occurs in 0.8%, 0.7%, 0.1%, and 0.3% of lines respectively. This trend is seen not only in the Odes, but also in other works of Horace and even in other poets such as Virgil.

Another indication that the books were written sequentially is the proportion of Sapphic 4th lines of the type terruit urbem) (3 syllables + 2) versus rara iuventūs (2 syllables + 3). The two types are equally common in book 1, but in later books the first type becomes increasingly common.

For these and other reasons Hutchinson argues that rather than being published all together, as is usually thought, it is likely that the first two books were at first published individually, but that all three books were later issued as a collection in 23 BC. This republication is probably what is referred to in Epistle 1.13, in which Horace requests his friend Vinnius to present a collection of books to Augustus at an opportune moment.

=== Datable odes ===
According to L. P. Wilkinson, there is no certain evidence that any of the Odes were written before 30 BC. In his view it would seem that Horace completed both the Epodes and the second book of his Satires in 30 BC, and immediately started work on the Odes. However, Nisbet and Hubbard, noting that 1.37 "does not read like a first attempt at Alcaics", believe that it is not possible to be sure that some the Odes were not written earlier.

In book 1 some odes can be approximately dated. 1.37 describes the death of Queen Cleopatra (30 BC). 1.31 appears to be set at the time of Octavian's dedication of the temple to Apollo on the Palatine Hill in 28 BC. 1.29 probably refers to Aelius Gallus's expedition to Arabia Felix in 26/25 BC.

In book 2, 2.9 must be after January 27 BC, since it names Octavian as Augustus, a title he was granted in that year. The title also occurs in books 3 and 4, but is not found in book 1, although Octavian is mentioned in that book six times, always under the name "Caesar". In 2.4, Horace claims to be 40 years old, an age he reached in December 25 BC. The mention of the Cantabrians in 2.6 perhaps refers to the rebellion of 25 or 24 BC.

In book 3 there are few certain dates, except for 3.14, which marks the return of Augustus from Spain in 24 BC.

After this there was a gap of a few years, and in this time, in 17 BC, Horace composed the Carmen saeculare.

In 4.1 Horace tells us that he is now "about" 50 years old, dating this poem to about 15 BC. The dramatic date of odes 4.2 and 4.5 is before summer 13 BC, which is probably the year when the fourth book was published.

== Arrangement of the poems ==
=== Books 1–3 ===
Although the first three books have different characters (e.g. book 1 starts with a variety of metres, while 3.1–6 are all in the same metre), yet there are some indications of a pattern in the arrangement of the poems in the collection as a whole. A number of schemes have been suggested, but one principle of arrangement appears to be that there is a symmetry (that is, a chiastic or ring structure) between the first and second half of the collection, so that several of the odes in the first half have a thematic or phrasal connection with corresponding odes in the second half.

For example, in the first (1.1) and last ode (3.30), which are both in the same rare metre and both addressed to Maecenas, Horace boasts of being the first poet to imitate aeolic-style lyric poetry in Latin. In both the 5th poem (1.5) and the 5th from the end (3.26) Horace signals his retirement from love affairs by stating that he has dedicated his clothes or lyre in the temple of the god or goddess of the sea. The 6th ode (1.6), in which he claims that the Muse forbids him from singing the praises of Caesar (Octavian), contrasts with the 6th from the end (3.25), in which he declares that Bacchus has inspired him to sing Caesar's praises. The 10th poem (1.10) is a hymn to Mercury, and the 10th from the end (3.21) is a hymn to a wine jar.

Sometimes the poems are linked by phrases rather than thematically. For example, the 18th poem (in praise of wine) and the 18th from the end (the spring of Bandusia) have little in common thematically, but are linked by the similar phrases perlucidior vitro 'more transparent than glass' in the last line of 1.18 and splendidior vitro 'more shining than glass' in the first line of 3.13. In 1.19, Horace admires the 'shining beauty of Glycera' (Glycerae nitor), and in 3.12 (19th from the end) the young girl Neobule admires the 'shining beauty of Hebrus' (nitor Hebri). In 1.24 Horace depicts Virgil as weeping for his friend Quintilius, while in 3.7 (24th from the end) he depicts a girl Asterie as weeping for her friend Gyges.

In one or two cases the position of the corresponding poems is not quite exact: for example, ode 1.3, in which Horace prays for a safe voyage across the dangerous Adriatic Sea for his friend Virgil, has links not to 3.28 (the 3rd from the end) but with 3.27, which starts by praying for a safe journey across the Adriatic for a certain Galatea; and the 20th poem (1.20), an invitation to Maecenas, matches not 3.11 as expected, but 3.8, which is also an invitation to Maecenas.

The central two poems, according to this symmetrical scheme, are 2.6 and 2.7 (the 44th from the beginning and 44th from the end respectively), which are both on the theme of friendship: in one Horace describes the places he imagines his friend Septimius would like to visit with him in the future, in the other he mentions places he has visited in the past with his friend Pompeius. There are also verbal echoes between these two poems, for example the word mecum 'with me' in the first line of each poem, and amici/amico 'friend' as the last word of each. The four poems preceding these (2.2–2.5) and four poems following them (2.8–2.11) also show symmetry: for example, in both 2.3 and 2.10 Horace recommends living by the "golden mean"; in 2.5 and 2.8 he describes two courtesans, one as yet inexperienced, the other experienced; and so on.

However, not all the odes are matched individually with their opposite in the other half of the collection. For example, the eight odes 1.8–1.14 appear to form an independent cycle. Within this group only one poem (1.10) can be matched with its opposite number (3.21), but the group as a whole balances another group of eight odes from 3.17–3.24. Similarly, the group 1.30–1.38 balances 2.13–2.20. Within each group, there may be internal correspondences: for example, 1.8 and 1.13 are both love poems addressed to Lydia. Thus the entire collection can be seen as symmetrical, even though the two halves are not of equal length (1040 and 1412 lines respectively).

Other scholars have noted that in some cases poems are paired thematically with the poem which follows. Thus in book 2, 2.2 and 2.3 both give philosophical advice; 2.4 and 2.5 both give advice on love affairs; 2.6 and 2.7 are both poems about friendship; 2.8 and 2.9 love poems; and 2.10 and 2.11 again philosophical, making a chiastic arrangement. However, some scholars claim that it is difficult to continue this principle throughout the book.

A chiastic arrangement has also been observed in other books of poems of this period, for example, in Virgil's Eclogues, Horace's Satires book 1, Propertius book 1, and in Tibullus book 1 and 2.

=== The Roman Odes ===
The six odes which begin book 3, all in the Alcaic metre, and on serious subjects such as the Roman Empire, virtue, and Augustus, have long been recognised as forming an independent group within the collection. Since Plüss (1882) they have generally been known as the "Roman Odes". At 336 lines, they form exactly one third of book 3, the 13 poems from 3.7 to 3.19 forming the second third, and the 11 poems from 3.20 to 3.30 the remainder.

Scholars have suggested a number of schemes showing how the six odes are structured, but a common view is that the longest ode, 3.4, describing the lifelong protection given to Horace by the Muses and the victory of Jupiter over the giants, is central. (At 80 lines, this is the longest of all the Odes in any book.) This central ode is flanked by two odes, 3.3 and 3.5, whose closely parallel structure has been noted. Among other points, both contain a long speech starting at line 18, one by Juno, the other by Regulus; one speaks of the fall of Troy, the other of Carthage. These in turn are flanked by 3.2 and 3.6, one describing the virtue required of Roman men, the other the moral degeneracy to be deplored in Roman women. According to this arrangement, the first ode, 3.1, serves as an introduction to the other five; its first eight lines in particular anticipate the themes of 3.4, marking out Horace as the priest of the Muses, and equating the victory of Jupiter over the giants with Augustus's rule over the empire.

The placing of 3.4 as the central ode is confirmed by the lengths of the odes. For it has been pointed out that if the lengths of the six odes, 48, 32, 72, 80, 56, and 48 lines, are examined, it will be seen that the combined length of 3.2 and 3.3 (104 lines) is exactly the same as the combined length of 3.5 and 3.6 (also 104 lines), making a symmetrical frame around the central ode. Another symmetry is that the combined length of 3.2 and 3.6 (80 lines) is equal to the length of the central ode 3.4 itself (also 80 lines). Similar numerical schemes have been found in other Augustan poetry collections such as Virgil's Eclogues and Tibullus book 2.

Another possibility is to take 3.1 and 3.2 together as balancing 3.6, keeping 3.4 as the central ode as before. This arrangement can also be supported by line numbers, since the sum of outer frame 3.1 + 3.2 + 3.6 (128 lines) is equal to that of the inner frame 3.3 + 3.5 (also 128 lines). The combination of 3.1 and 3.4 also adds up to 128 lines. It may perhaps not be a coincidence that the cycle in the second half of book 2 (2.13 to 2.20) can be divided into two halves, each of 128 lines.

Ode 3.2 (29th from the end of books 1–3) is one of the poems which has links to its counterpart in the first half of the book, 1.29 (29th from the beginning). The phrase acrem militiam/acri militia 'fierce warfare' is found in line 2 of both poems, and they are also linked by the shared vocabulary Medo/Parthos 'Persian(s)', virginum/virgo 'virgin(s)', and sponsus/sponso 'betrothed'. In both poems Horace appears to sympathise with the conquered barbarians more than the Roman conquerors, greedy for loot and slaves.

=== Book 4 ===
For book 4, several schemes have been suggested, such as pentadic or triadic, but a number of scholars such as Eduard Fraenkel have seen the central three poems (4.7–4.9), dealing with the inevitability of death, as forming a separate group. Helena Dettmer points out that this central group of three poems is flanked by two other groups (4.3–4.6 and 4.10–4.13), each consisting of four poems chiastically arranged: thus the themes of 4.3–4.6 are Carmen Saeculare – Praise of Drusus – Praise of Augustus – Carmen Saeculare, while those of 4.10–4.13 are Old Age and Love – Invitation – Invitation – Old Age and Love.

The poem at the centre of the book, 4.8, is unusual in that it uses the rare 1st Asclepiad metre, otherwise only used for the first and last poems of Odes 1–3; all three of these poems describe how Horace will gain everlasting fame through his poetry. With 38 lines it is also the only one of the 103 odes to have a number of lines not divisible by four (although some critics have tried to remedy this by suggesting two lines for deletion).

Dettmer notes further links between the first six poems and the last six, though these are not completely systematic. For example, 4.1~4.10 (Ligurinus), 4.2~4.11 (Celebration of Augustus's return / Maecenas's birthday, both in Sapphics), 4.3~4.12 (Horace and Virgil), 4.6~4.15 (both addressed to Apollo) and so on. The book begins and ends by naming the goddess Venus, who like Apollo was particularly venerated by Augustus.

== Metres ==
Altogether the four books contain 103 odes, to which may be added the Carmen Saeculare. A variety of different metres is used, but the main ones are Alcaic, Sapphic, and the various forms of Asclepiad.

The metres are not all evenly spread. Asclepiad metres, which are common in books 1, 3, and 4, are found only once in book 2. In book 2, all the odd-numbered poems are Alcaic, as well as 2.14 and 2.20; while most of the even numbered poems are Sapphic. The first nine poems of book 1 (known as the "parade odes") are each in a different metre; the first six poems of book 3 (known as the "Roman odes") are all in Alcaic.

The metre of most of the poems can be deduced from the first three syllables of their first line:

x – ᴗ = Alcaic
– ᴗ – = Sapphic (except 2.18)
– – – = Asclepiadic (except 1.7, 4.7)
ᴗ ᴗ – = Ionic

Thus the poem beginning ēheu fugācēs is Alcaic, integer vītae is Sapphic, ō fōns Bandusiae is Asclepiadic, and miserārum est is Ionic.

Because Alcaeus and Sappho wrote in the Aeolic Greek dialect, their metres are known as "Aeolic". Horace himself (Odes 3.30.13–14) claimed to be "the first to have brought Aeolic song to Latin poetry" (prīnceps Aeolium carmen ad Ītalōs/ dēdūxisse modōs); which is true if two poems written by Catullus (11 and 51) in Sapphic stanzas are not counted. Asclepiades lived in the 3rd century BC, and did not write in the Aeolic dialect. Only a few epigrams written by him survive, none of them in the asclepiadean metre.

=== Alcaic stanza ===
The four-line Alcaic stanza is used in 37 Odes. These are:

Book 1: 9, 16, 17, 26, 27, 29, 31, 34, 35, 37
Book 2: 1, 3, 5, 7, 9, 11, 13, 14, 15, 17, 19, 20
Book 3: 1, 2, 3, 4, 5, 6, 17, 21, 23, 26, 29
Book 4: 4, 9, 14, 15

In the Alcaic stanza the first two lines start with an iambic rhythm. The first syllable is sometimes short (13 times in book 1), but usually long. There is almost always a word-break after the 5th syllable. The third line has an iambic rhythm, but the fourth line starts with two dactyls.

x – ᴗ – – / – ᴗ ᴗ – ᴗ x
x – ᴗ – – / – ᴗ ᴗ – ᴗ x
x – ᴗ – – – ᴗ – x
– ᴗ ᴗ – ᴗ ᴗ – ᴗ – x

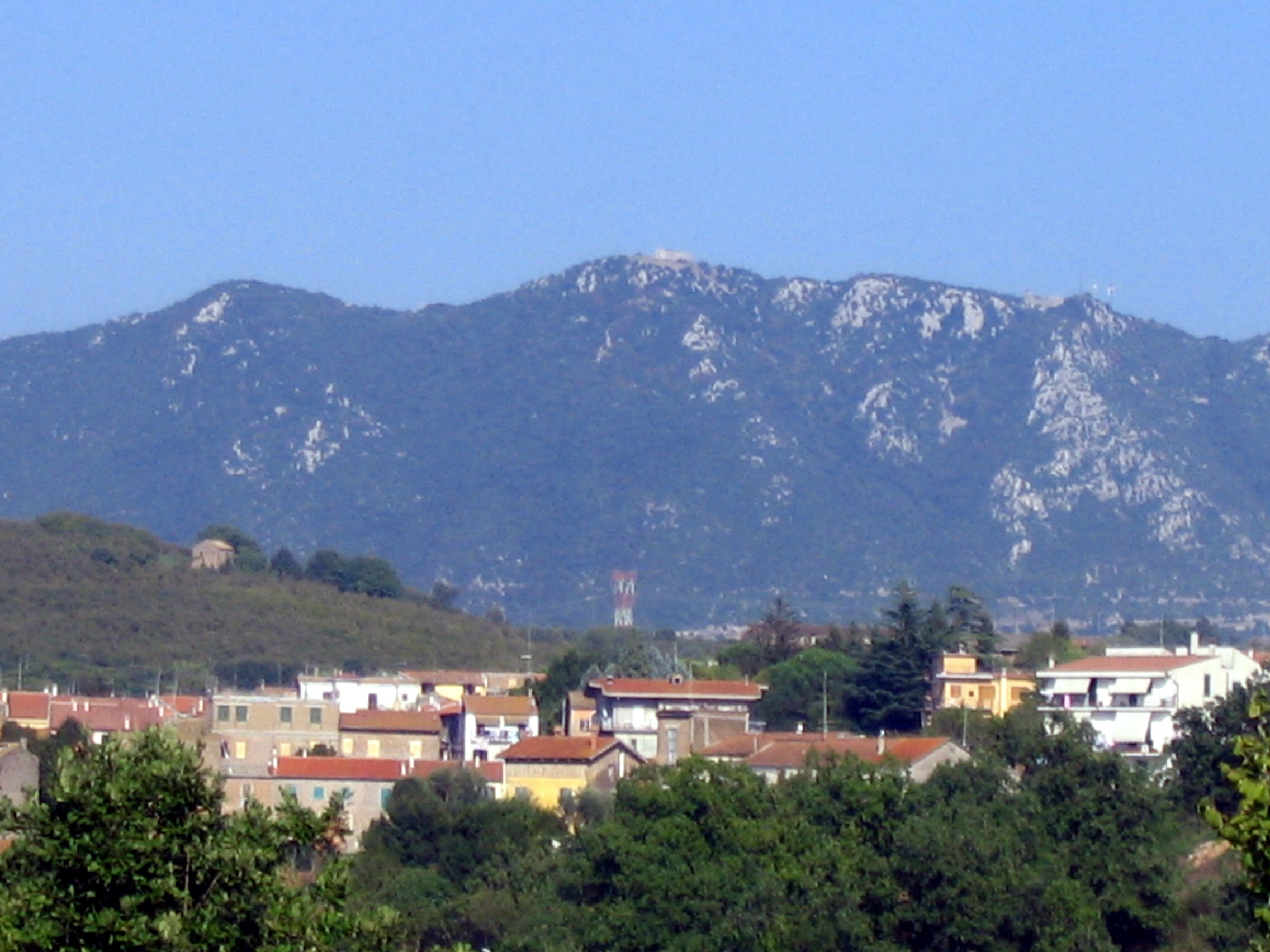
Monte Soratte (Soracte) seen from Via Flaminia

Vidēs ut altā / stet nive candidum
Soracte nec iam / sustineant onus
silvae labōrantēs gelūque
flūmina cōnstiterint acūtō?

'Do you see how Soracte is standing,
white with deep snow, and the labouring woods
no longer sustain their burden
and the rivers have frozen with sharp frost?'

The Alcaic stanza does not appear to have been used by any Roman poet before Horace. It is used in one poem of Statius (Silv. 4.5), imitating Horace, otherwise it does not appear to have been written by any major Latin poet.

The Alcaic stanza was often used by Horace for poems in the grand style, for example, the six Roman Odes (Odes 3.1–6), and the odes in praise of Drusus (4.4), Tiberius (4.14) and Augustus (4.15) in book 4.

=== Sapphic stanza ===
The Sapphic stanza is used in 25 odes, and in the Carmen Saeculare. The odes in this metre are:

Book 1: 2, 10, 12, 20, 22, 25, 30, 32, 38
Book 2: 2, 4, 6, 8, 10, 16
Book 3: 8, 11, 14, 18, 20, 22, 27
Book 4: 2, 6, 11
Carmen Saeculare

The first three lines of a Sapphic stanza have a trochaic rhythm. In Sappho and Alcaeus the fourth syllable can sometimes be short, but in Horace it is always long. There is normally a word-break after the fifth syllable, but occasionally (especially in the Carmen Saeculare and Odes book 4) it can come after the 6th syllable. The fourth line is an adonean (– ᴗ ᴗ – x).

– ᴗ – – – / ᴗ ᴗ – ᴗ – x
– ᴗ – – – / ᴗ ᴗ – ᴗ – x
– ᴗ – – – / ᴗ ᴗ – ᴗ – x
– ᴗ ᴗ – x

Iam satis terrīs / nivis atque dīrae
grandinis mīsit / Pater et rubente
dexterā sacrās / iaculātus arcēs
terruit Urbem,

'By now the Father has sent enough snow and fearsome
hail on the earth, and by casting thunderbolts
with red right hand at the sacred citadels
has terrified the City.'

The Sapphic stanza can be distinguished from the Alcaic and Asclepiad by the cretic rhythm (– ᴗ –) of its first three syllables.

Although called "Sapphic", in fact this metre was used by both Alcaeus and Sappho. In Latin, Catullus had already used the Sapphic stanza in poems 11 and 51 (the latter being a translation of one of Sappho's poems). The poet Statius wrote one poem in this metre (Silv. 4.7) and Seneca the Younger wrote a chorus (Medea 579–606) in Sapphic stanzas, as well as sometimes writing the longer line continuously (e.g. Phaedr. 274–324).

=== Asclepiad systems ===
The asclepiad line is a glyconic with an extra choriamb; the greater asclepiad has two extra choriambs. It is used in 5 different patterns, which are numbered differently in different authors. The numbers 1, 2, 3, 4, 5 used by Klingner (1939), Nisbet & Hubbard (1970), D. West (1995), and Mayer (2012), (followed here) are called 1, 4, 5, 3, 2 by Wickham (1896) and Raven (1965), and 1, 3, 4, 2, 5 by Page (1895), Bennett (1914), and Rudd (2004). In their joint edition of Odes book 3 (2004), Nisbet and Rudd drop the numbering and simply refer to "Asclepiad systems".

Altogether the various asclepiad metres are used in 34 odes.

1st Asclepiad (a continuous series of lesser asclepiad lines used stichically)

Book 1: 1
Book 3: 30
Book 4: 8

– – – ᴗ ᴗ – / – ᴗ ᴗ – ᴗ x

Maecēnās atavīs / ēdite rēgibus
ō et praesidi(um) et / dulce decus meum

'Maecenas, descended from ancestral kings,
and o! my protection and sweet glory'

In Horace, there is almost always a word-break after the sixth syllable of the asclepiad. In the Greek poets the first two syllables of the asclepiad, pherecratean, and glyconic can be long or short (making the so called "Aeolic base"), but in Horace they are always long (except apparently at 1.15.36). The asclepiad can easily be distinguished from the Alcaic and Sapphic metres by the three long syllables with which it begins.

2nd Asclepiad (a series of three asclepiads followed by a glyconic)

Book 1: 6, 15, 24, 33
Book 2: 12
Book 3: 10, 16
Book 4: 5, 12

– – – ᴗ ᴗ – / – ᴗ ᴗ – ᴗ x.
– – – ᴗ ᴗ – / – ᴗ ᴗ – ᴗ x.
– – – ᴗ ᴗ – / – ᴗ ᴗ – ᴗ x.
– – – ᴗ ᴗ – ᴗ x.

Iam vēris comitēs, / quae mare temperant,
impellunt animae / lintea Thrāciae,
iam nec prāta rigent, / nec fluviī strepunt
hībernā nive turgidī.

'Now spring's companions, the Thracian breezes,
which calm the sea, are driving on the sails;
now the meadows are no long frozen, nor do the rivers roar,
swollen with winter snow.'

3rd Asclepiad (two asclepiads followed by a pherecratean and a glyconic)

Book 1: 5, 14, 21, 23
Book 3: 7, 13
Book 4: 13

– – – ᴗ ᴗ – / – ᴗ ᴗ – ᴗ x.
– – – ᴗ ᴗ – / – ᴗ ᴗ – ᴗ x.
– – – ᴗ ᴗ – x
– – – ᴗ ᴗ – ᴗ x.

Quis multā gracilis / tē puer in rosā
perfūsus liquidīs / urget odōribus
grātō, Pyrrha, sub antrō?
cui flāvam religās comam?

'What slender boy, drenched in perfumed oil,
is pressing you on a bed of roses
in a pleasant grotto, Pyrrha?
For whom do you bind up your yellow hair...?

4th Asclepiad (a glyconic followed by an asclepiad)

Book 1: 3, 13, 19, 36
Book 3: 9, 15, 19, 24, 25, 28
Book 4: 1, 3

– – – ᴗ ᴗ – ᴗ x
– – – ᴗ ᴗ – / – ᴗ ᴗ – ᴗ x.

Māter saeva Cupīdinum
Thēbānaeque iubet / mē Semelae puer
et lascīva Licentia
fīnītīs animum / redder(e) amōribus.

'The cruel mother of the Cupids
and the son of Theban Semele
and wanton Licentiousness are bidding me
to return my mind to the loves I thought were finished.'

5th Asclepiad (a series of greater asclepiads used stichically)

Book 1: 11, 18
Book 4: 10

The greater asclepiad is similar to the lesser asclepiad, but lengthened by an extra choriamb (– ᴗ ᴗ –). In Horace it has a word-break after both the 6th and the 10th syllable. This metre is also found in Theocritus 28, 30 and Catullus 30, as well as several poems by Alcaeus.

– – – ᴗ ᴗ – / – ᴗ ᴗ – / – ᴗ ᴗ – ᴗ x

tū nē quaesierīs, / scīre nefās, / quem mihi, quem tibī
fīnem dī dederint, / Leuconoē, / nec Babylōniōs
temptārīs numerōs. / ut melius, / quidquid erit patī
seu plūrīs hiemēs, / seu tribuit / Iuppiter ultimam.

'Do not inquire – it is a sin to know – what end the gods
have given to me, and what to you, Leuconoë; and do not try out
Babylonian astrology. How much better it is to suffer whatever will be,
whether Jupiter will grant more winters, or has granted our last.'

=== Rarer metres ===
The remaining metres are only used in one or two poems each. As with the asclepiad metres, there is no general agreement among scholars as to the names of the archilochian ones.

==== 1st Archilochian ====
(a dactylic hexameter followed by a dactylic tetrameter)

Book 1: 7, 28

– ᴗ ᴗ – ᴗ ᴗ – / ᴗ ᴗ – ᴗ ᴗ – ᴗ ᴗ – x
– ᴗ ᴗ – ᴗ ᴗ – ᴗ ᴗ – x

Laudābunt aliī clāram Rhodon aut Mytilēnēn
aut Epheson bimarisve Corinthī
moenia vel Bacchō Thēbās vel Apolline Delphōs
īnsignīs aut Thessala Tempē:

'Others will praise famous Rhodes or Mytilene
or Ephesus or two-sea'd Corinth's
city walls or Thebes, notable for Bacchus, or Delphi for Apollo,
or Thessalian Tempe.'

This metre is also known as the Alcmanian (or Alcmanic) stanza. The metre is also used in Epode 12, and it is the only metre Horace uses in both the Odes and Epodes.

==== 2nd Archilochian ====
(a dactylic hexameter followed by a dactylic hemiepes.)

Book 4: 7

– ᴗ ᴗ – ᴗ ᴗ – / ᴗ ᴗ – ᴗ ᴗ – ᴗ ᴗ – x
– ᴗ ᴗ – ᴗ ᴗ x

Diffūgēre nivēs / redeunt iam grāmina campīs
arboribusque comae

'The snows have fled away and the grass is now returning to the plains
and the leaves to the trees'

This metre is also known as the "1st Archilochian".

==== 3rd Archilochian ====
(a dactylic tetrameter + ithyphallic (= 3 trochees), followed by an iambic trimeter catalectic)

Book 1: 4

– ᴗ ᴗ – ᴗ ᴗ – ᴗ ᴗ – ᴗ ᴗ / – ᴗ – ᴗ – x
x – ᴗ – – / – ᴗ – ᴗ – x

Solvitur ācris hiēms grātā vice / vēris et Favōnī
trahuntque siccās / māchinae carīnās,
ac neque iam stabulīs gaudet pecus / aut arātor ignī
nec prāta cānīs / albicant pruīnīs.

'Harsh winter is being loosened with a welcome change of spring and the West Wind;
and machines are dragging the dry keels (to the shore);
the cattle no longer rejoice in their stables or the ploughman in his fire;
nor are the meadows white with hoar frost.'

This metre is also called the "4th Archilochian". The first of these lines is known as a "greater Archilochian".

==== Hipponactean ====
(a trochaic dimeter catalectic, followed by an iambic trimeter catalectic)

Book 2: 18

– ᴗ – ᴗ – ᴗ x
x – ᴗ – x / – ᴗ – ᴗ – x

Nōn ebur nequ(e) aureum
meā renīdet / in domō lacūnar

'No ivory and no golden
panelled ceiling glitters in my house'

==== Greater Sapphic ====
(an aristophaneus followed by a greater Sapphic line)

Book 1: 8
– ᴗ ᴗ – ᴗ – x
– ᴗ – – – ᴗ ᴗ – / – ᴗ ᴗ – ᴗ – x

Lȳdia, dīc, per omnīs
hoc deōs vērē, Sybarin / cūr properēs amandō
perdere, cūr aprīcum
ōderit campum, patiēns / pulveris atque sōlis,...

'Lydia, by all the gods tell me
this truly, why do you hasten to destroy Sybaris by loving him,
why does he shun the sunny
Campus, though he can well tolerate the dust and the sun?'

Nisbet and Hubbard cite no other examples of this metrical form in Horace or in other poets. The metre is not found in the surviving fragments of Sappho and Alcaeus.

==== Ionic ====
(an ionic metron (ᴗ ᴗ – –) repeated ten times)

Book 3: 12

ᴗ ᴗ – – / ᴗ ᴗ – – / ᴗ ᴗ – – / ᴗ ᴗ – – /
ᴗ ᴗ – – / ᴗ ᴗ – – / ᴗ ᴗ – – / ᴗ ᴗ – – /
ᴗ ᴗ – – / ᴗ ᴗ – –

Miserārum (e)st / nequ(e) amōrī / dare lūdum / neque dulcī
mala vīnō / laver(e) aut exanimārī / metuentīs
patruae verbera linguae.

'It is only sad girls who do not play with love, or wash away
their troubles with sweet wine or faint for fear
of the lashings of an uncle's tongue.'

There tends to be a word-break after each metron, although not every time. The above arrangement is as given in Wickham's Oxford Classical Text. Other editors arrange the stanzas 4 + 4 + 2 or 4 + 3 + 3. Other editors, such as Gould (1977) and Quinn (1980), prefer to arrange the poem in four-line stanzas. Woodman (2021) agrees and prints it with a 2 + 2 + 4 + 2 arrangement as follows:

Miserārum (e)st nequ(e) Amōrī
dare lūdum neque dulcī
mala vīnō laver(e) aut exanimārī metuentēs
patruae verbera linguae.

This four-line arrangement is felt to be more in keeping with the rest of the Odes. Another advantage is that the number of lines in 3.7–3.19 (336) now becomes exactly the same as that of 3.1–3.6 and 3.20–3.30.

Another possibility, also in four-line stanzas, was suggested in the 19th century by a certain "S.S.I.", with a 3 + 3 + 3 + 1 arrangement.

Miserārum (e)st / nequ(e) amōrī / dare lūdum
neque dulcī / mala vīnō / laver(e) aut ex-
animārī / metuentīs / patruae ver-
bera linguae.

He suggested that by moving the position of the words simul ... undis in the 3rd stanza to follow victus, the word Bellerophonte comes at the end of a line where its anomalous short final vowel can perhaps be licensed by the principle of brevis in longo.

== See also ==
- Prosody (Latin)

== Works cited ==
- Dettmer, H. M. R. (1976). The Structural Pattern of Horace's Odes. University of Michigan PhD.
- Hutchinson, G. O. (2002). "The Publication and Individuality of Horace's Odes Books 1-3". The Classical Quarterly, Vol. 52, No. 2 (2002), pp. 517–537.
- Nisbet, R. G. M. & Hubbard, M. (1970). A Commentary on Horace Odes Book 1. Oxford.
- Nisbet, R. G. M. & Hubbard, M. (1978). A Commentary on Horace Odes, Book II. Oxford.
- Port, W. (1926). "Die Anordnung in Gedichtbüchern augusteischer Zeit". Philologus, 81(1-4)
