= Ludwig Rhesa =

Prussian academic (1776–1840)

Martin Ludwig Jedemin Rhesa
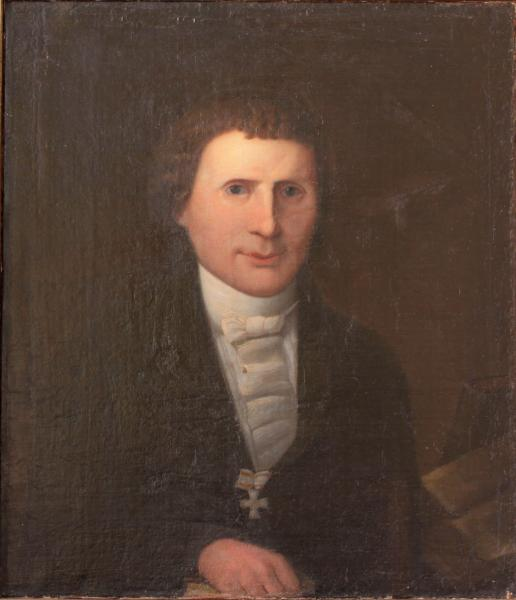
- Born: 9 January 1776; Karvaičiai (Karwaiten), East Prussia, Kingdom of Prussia
- Died: 30 August 1840 (aged 64); Königsberg, East Prussia, Kingdom of Prussia
- Education: University of Königsberg
- Occupations: Lutheran pastor, university professor

Martin Ludwig Jedemin Rhesa (Note: From around 1816, he usually replaced his second name Martin with Jedemin (after Grand Duke Gediminas).) (Lithuanian: Martynas Liudvikas Gediminas Rėza; 9 January 1776 – 30 August 1840) was a Lutheran pastor and a professor at the University of Königsberg in East Prussia. He is best remembered as publisher of Lithuanian texts. He was the last prominent advocate of the Lithuanian language in Lithuania Minor.

Orphaned at an early age, Rhesa was taken in by his distant relatives. Though interested in linguistics, he studied theology at the University of Königsberg as it provided a more secure employment after graduation. He became a military chaplain of the Königsberg garrison and participated in the Napoleonic Wars, including the French invasion of Russia and the Battle of Leipzig. In 1816, he resigned from the chaplaincy devoting the rest of his life to academics. He received doctorates in philosophy (1807) and theology (1819). In 1810, he became leader of the Lithuanian language seminar at the University of Königsberg. He revived the seminar and led it until his death, becoming an authority on the Lithuanian language.

Rhesa initiated a new revision to the 1755 Bible translation into Lithuanian which was published in 1816 and 1824. He worked diligently to correct translation errors and to improve the purity of the Lithuanian language (by, for example, replacing Germanisms with Lithuanian equivalents). Rhesa was the first to publish secular Lithuanian texts in Lithuania Minor, most important of which were the Lithuanian epic poem The Seasons by Kristijonas Donelaitis (1818) and a collection of 85 Lithuanian folk songs and their translations to German (1825). The collection became popular in western Europe and is considered the first study of Lithuanian folklore. These two publications were meant to showcase "creativity, richness and originality of spiritual culture" of the Lithuanian nation. Rhesa compiled an unfinished German–Lithuanian dictionary. He also published texts in German, including two poetry collections (1809 and 1825) and impressions from his travels during the Napoleonic Wars (1814).

== Biography ==
=== Early life and education ===
Rhesa was born on 9 January 1776 in the village of Karvaičiai (Karwaiten) on the Curonian Spit in the Kingdom of Prussia. The village was buried under the dunes in 1797. Rhesa's family lived in Lithuania Minor since at least the 16th century and included teachers and publishers. The family is likely of Curonian origin, but Rhesa considered himself to be a Lithuanian. His father owned an inn in Karvaičiai and guarded the coast. Youngest of eight children, Rhesa was orphaned at the age of 6 and was taken in by distant relatives – first, by a fisherman in Nagliai then by a postman in Rossitten (now Rybachy).

In 1785, Rhesa moved to live with his cousin-in-law Christian David Wittich who at the time was priest in Kaukehmen (now Yasnoye). Wittich recognized Rhesa's academic interests and taught him Latin and other subjects. In 1791–1794, Rhesa studied at a school in Löbenicht (a quarter of central Königsberg now Kaliningrad). To earn a living, Rhesa worked as a tutor. He completed his education in three years (usually, it took four years to graduate). In March 1795, he enrolled at the University of Königsberg to study theology. He attended lectures by Immanuel Kant, Christian Jakob Kraus, and was particularly close with professor Johann Gottfried Hasse. Upon theirs deaths, Rhesa composed poems in their memory. Rhesa was interested in linguistics and attended lectures on the Lithuanian language, but theology was more practical as it provided more secure employment after graduation.

=== Military chaplain ===
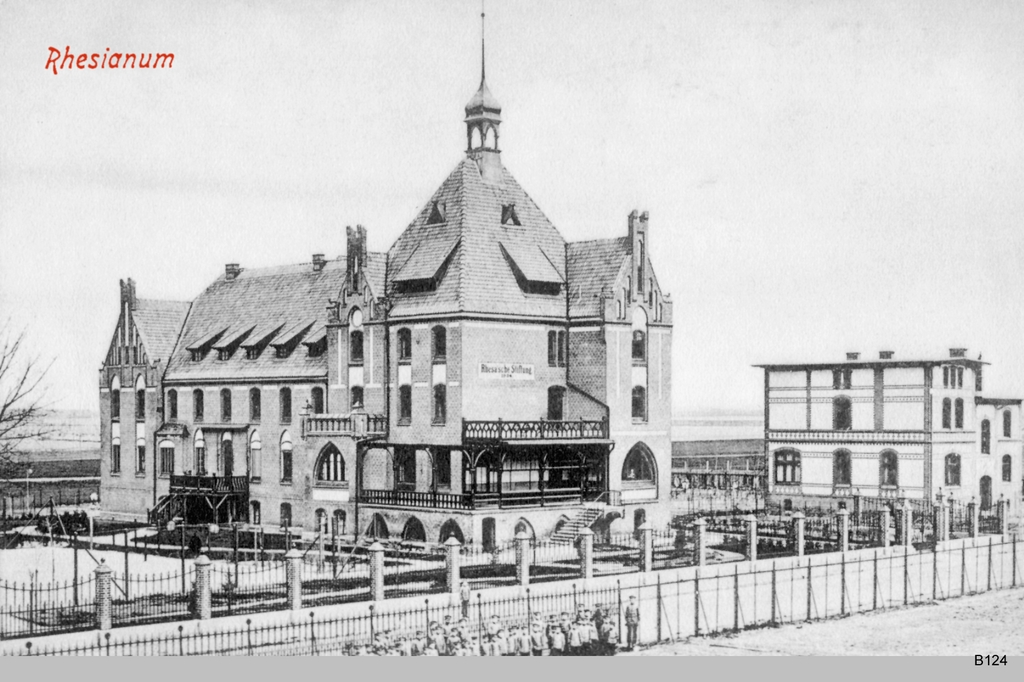
Student dormitory in Königsberg built according to Rhesa's last will

Rhesa graduated in 1799 and worked as a tutor for a few months. In August 1800, he was ordained as a military chaplain of the Königsberg garrison at Fort Friedrichsburg. In 1806, he joined the Masonic lodge Under Three Crowns and was its member until his death. In 1807, Rhesa completed his dissertation on the moral explanation of the holy texts based on teachings of Immanuel Kant, received doctorate in philosophy, and was invited to teach at the university as a privatdozent. In 1811, he was elected a true member of the Royal German Society.

He continued to work as a military chaplain and in 1811 was promoted to chaplain of a brigade. With his units participated in the French invasion of Russia and retreat to France. He was at the Battle of Leipzig. During these travels, Rhesa visited Lithuania proper and searched for academic contacts. He became acquainted with Karl von Lieven who later unsuccessfully attempted to recruit Rhesa to teach at the Imperial University of Dorpat. Rhesa was able to visit London and obtain 200 pounds sterling from the British and Foreign Bible Society for the Bible translation into Lithuanian. He returned to Königsberg in 1816 and resigned from the chaplaincy devoting the rest of his life to academics.

=== Leader of the Lithuanian language seminar ===
In 1810, after publishing a treatise on the Christianization of Lithuania, Rhesa became an extraordinary professor and director of the Lithuanian language seminar at the university. Earlier in 1809, the university considered shutting down the seminar due to lack of funds, but Rhesa was successful in defending the seminar. On several occasions, Rhesa defended the Lithuanian language against Germanization arguing that language is the greatest treasure bestowed by God upon a nation and the it expresses nation's spirit and character. He even suggested introducing Lithuanian language classes in gymnasiums in Tilsit (now Sovetsk), Gumbinnen (now Gusev), Insterburg (now Chernyakhovsk).

As the leader of the Lithuanian language seminar, Rhesa revived it and expanded its Lithuanian library. He separated students into two groups, one for beginners and another for more advanced students. The university set the number of students at 12, but the actual numbers was often double that. Rhesa later added the third group for advanced students which he taught without receiving compensation from the university. He long sought to hire a permanent lecturer for the seminar and to introduce Lithuanian language lessons at the Tilsit Gymnasium so that the university would not have teach the basics. However, that was achieved only after his death. During Rhesa's life, the university grew suspicious of the growing popularity of the seminar. Rhesa was ordered to return it to its roots – abandon academic aspirations and focus on teaching future priests how to communicate with their parishioners who spoke Lithuanian.

Rhesa was considered an authority on the Lithuanian language. In 1830–1831, he was visited by Jurgis Pliateris and Simonas Stanevičius. Russian philologist Pyotr Preis arrived to Königsberg to learn Lithuanian from Rhesa in 1839. In 1837, Rhesa employed Friedrich Kurschat, another Prussian Lithuanian, as his assistant. After Rhesa's death Kurschat became the leader the Lithuanian language seminar.

=== University professor ===
In April 1819, he defended his thesis on sources and origin of the first three canonical gospels, received doctorate in theology, and became an ordinary professor. He taught old oriental languages and theology. In 1825, he delivered a lecture to the Royal German Society on the poetry of Nicolas Boileau-Despréaux (1636–1711) and his poem L’Art poétique.

Intermittently, Rhesa served as dean of the theology faculty (1819, 1821–1823, 1825–1832, 1840) and as prorector of the university (1820/21, 1824/25, 1830/31 winter semesters). Since rector was heir to the Prussian throne, prorector was an acting rector. In 1829, he became consistorial councilor of the Evangelical Church in Prussia. Rhesa was awarded three Prussian state medals – medal for distinction in battle (1814), gold medal for merits for publishing the Lithuanian Bible (1818), and Order of the Red Eagle (4th class, 1840).

He lived a simple, disciplined life. As a professor, he was strict and thus not liked by his students.

=== Death, memory, and legacy ===
Rhesa died on 30 September 1840 and was buried near the Brandenburg Gate in Kneiphof. His tombstone depicted an open Bible with a Lithuanian inscription Tai esti visas Šventas Raštas (That is the entire holy scripture). The other side has inscriptions referencing his three main publications: collection of Lithuanian folk songs, epic poem The Seasons, and poetry collection Prutena. The grave was destroyed at the end of World War II. As he remained unmarried and without children, he left his money for the construction of a student dormitory, known as Rhesianum, which was completed in 1854. Rhesa also left personal library of about 3,000 books (among them 65 books and two periodicals in the Lithuanian language). Many of these books were acquired by historian Friedrich Wilhelm Schubert who published the first biography of Rhesa in 1855. Rhesa's manuscripts ended up at the Prussian State Archive Königsberg. In 1945, some of the materials were brought to Lithuania and are now stored at the Wroblewski Library of the Lithuanian Academy of Sciences.

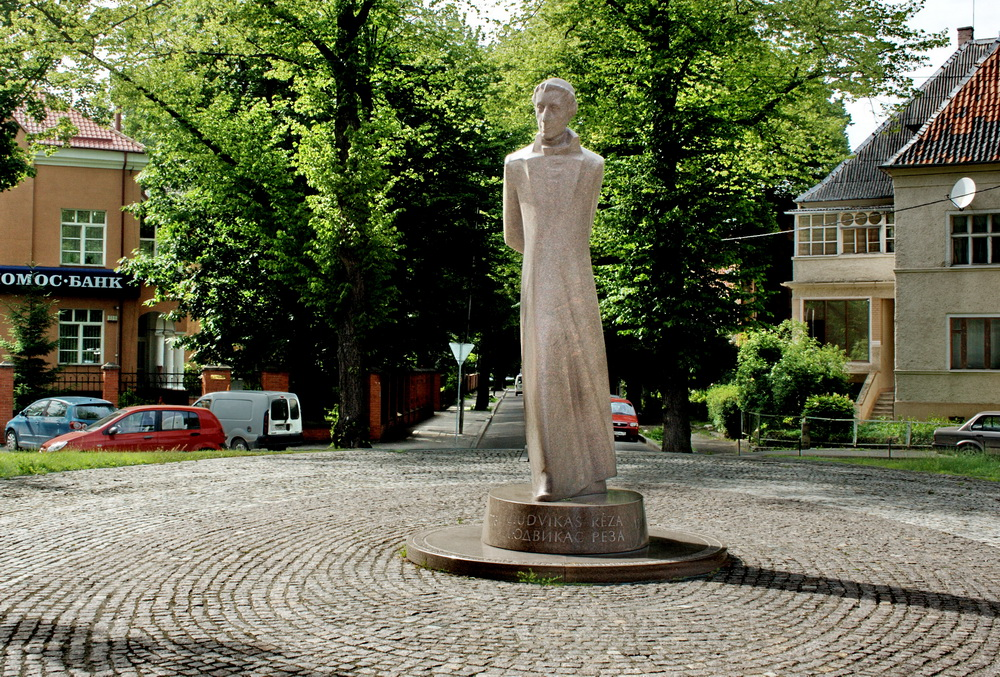
Munument to Rhesa in Kaliningrad

In 1975, to commemorate his 200th birth anniversary, a wooden sculpture by sculptor Eduardas Jonušas was erected near the former location of his native Karvaičiai village. Sculptor Arūnas Sakalauskas erected a stone sculpture in Rhesa's memory in Juodkrantė in 1994. In 2005, on the occasion of the 750th anniversary of the founding of Königsberg, the Lithuanian Ministry of Culture gifted a sculpture by Sakalauskas to Kaliningrad. In 2009, during the celebrations of the millennium of Lithuania, a symbolic Tree of Unity was unveiled in Vingis Park in Vilnius. A hundred names of most prominent Lithuanians, including Rhesa, were inscribed on the monument.

In 2007, a culture center named after Rhesa was opened in Juodkrantė. In 2008, Neringa Municipality established an award named after Rhesa for scientific, educational, or cultural achievements benefiting the Curonian Spit. The award ceremony is held annually on Rhesa's birthday.

Albinas Jovaišas published the first monograph about Rhesa in 1969. Since 2009, the Institute of Lithuanian Literature and Folklore has been working on collecting and publishing all works by Rhesa. Five volumes edited by Liucija Citavičiūtė were published by 2020.

Seimas (Lithuanian parliament) declared 2016 to be the year of Rhesa.

== Works ==
=== Lithuanian Bible ===
In 1809, Rhesa established contacts with Wilhelm von Humboldt, Prussian Minister of Education, who promised to support a new revision to the 1755 Bible translation into Lithuanian. The same year, Rhesa organized an editorial committee of local priests to review and revise the Lithuanian bible. Rhesa was the only university professor fluent in Lithuanian, thus most of the work was done by him. The war interrupted the efforts, but the bible was published in 1816 and 1824. In connection with this work, Rhesa published two philological studies in German: about the history of Bible translations into Lithuanian (1816) and with critical remarks on the translations (two parts in 1816 and 1824).

Rhesa was concerned with correcting various translation errors that misunderstood and twisted the original Biblical texts. To that end he critically reviewed the German Luther Bible, compared it with the Hebrew Bible, Greek Septuagint, Latin Vulgate, and consulted their translations into Syrian, Arabic, and other old languages. He also had various books on Biblical criticism by more than 150 authors. He was further concerned with the purity of the Lithuanian language – he worked to remove Germanisms and replace them with Lithuanian equivalents. He was less successful in identifying and removing Slavic loanwords. To find suitable Lithuanian words, Rhesa utilized the manuscript of the Lithuanian bible by Jonas Bretkūnas.

=== Lithuanian secular texts ===
While many religious texts in Lithuanian were published in Lithuania Minor with government's assistance, Rhesa was the first to publish secular Lithuanian texts.

==== The Seasons ====
After about a decade of work, Rhesa published the Lithuanian epic poem The Seasons (German: Das Jahr, Lithuanian: Metai) by Kristijonas Donelaitis and its translation to German in 1818. It was Rhesa who decided to title the poem The Seasons and start it with the part about spring. Rhesa's publication was more aimed at the educated German-speaking public than at academic study. As such, he freely edited the text, deleting 469 lines and adding a few new ones based on surviving letters and other drafts. He also added or modified words to strengthen the dactylic hexameter.

The publication started with a dedication (23-line German poem) to Wilhelm von Humboldt who had encouraged Rhesa to publish The Seasons. As an introduction, Rhesa added a study in German of the poem which discussed poem's genre and goals, artistic and educational value, verse and accentuation as well as difficulties translating it to German. Rhesa emphasized poem's originality and argued that it was not inspired by other German or classical works. He praised poem's linguistic richness, its strong Lithuanian character, and focus on the life and culture of Lithuanian serfs. Rhesa also included the first biography of Donelaitis. At the end, Rhesa added 82 comments to explain Lithuanian customs and traditions, for example he described the preparation of certain dishes, making of bast shoes, or use of a crooked staff known as krivulė.

==== Lithuanian folk songs ====
===== Content =====
In 1825, Rhesa published a collection of 85 Lithuanian folk songs and their translations to German titled Dainos oder Litthauische Volkslieder. It was the first published book of Lithuanian songs. The publication also included seven melodies, a study of Lithuanian folk songs by Rhesa, and detailed philological and other notes at the end. The book was dedicated to Karl vom Stein zum Altenstein, Minister of Education. A new edition of the songs was published by Friedrich Kurschat in 1843. Other editions were published in two volumes in 1935–1937 by Mykolas Biržiška and in 1958–1964.

The introductory study of the folk songs was an expanded and reworked version of his 1809 introduction to his poetry collection Prutena and his 1818 article published in Beiträge zur Kunde Preußens. In his study on the folk songs, Rhesa divided them into three main genres (songs, hymns, and archaic laments (rauda)) and identified their main characteristics. According to Rhesa, Lithuanian songs are natural and simple. They express tender and sincere feelings, not deep philosophical truths. They use plentiful diminutives which charm the listener but make the songs particularly hard to translate. While many songs are love songs, the word "love" is essentially missing. The feelings of love are expressed as gentle melancholy of the pure heart longing for the beloved. According to Rhesa, the songs are deeply virtuous and have no indecent references. Some songs have preserved remnants of the ancient Lithuanian mythology and contain references to pagan gods Perkūnas, Žemyna, etc. He then described the common metre (iamb, trochee, amphibrach, or mixed), melody (which is difficult to record), and rhythm (not an essential feature of Lithuanian songs).

Rhesa claimed that he worked on this publication for 15 years. He wanted to visit Lithuania proper to collect songs there, but was unable. Therefore, the publication includes only ten songs from Lithuania proper, all of them reprinted from Tygodnik Wileński. To get more interesting songs, Rhesa published an appeal to friends of the Lithuanian language to send him song samples. Songs from Lithuania Minor were contributed by nine priests and officials. Rhesa had more helpers and collected more songs (about 200) than what was published. 145 of the unpublished songs were collected and published in 1964. Since the collection also included 56 melodies composed by Vytautas Paltanavičius, it became very popular among folk assembles.

===== Reception =====
In 1820, Rhesa sent a manuscript with 89 songs to Johann Wolfgang von Goethe hoping to get his critique, support, or recommendation, but Goethe never replied. He did, however, publish a favorable review of Dainos in Über Kunst und Altertum. Goethe also wrote a second review, but it was only published posthumously in 1833. His review became instrumental in popularizing Lithuanian songs in western Europe. In total, at least nine reviews of Dainos, including by Jacob Grimm in Göttingische Gelehrte Anzeigen and Franciszek Siarczyński, were published in various German and Polish journals.

Songs from the collection were translated to Czech by František Čelakovský, Polish by Kazimierz Brodziński, Adam Rościszewski, Antoni Edward Odyniec, Franciszek Zatorski, Russian by Pavel Kukolnik (published by Adam Kirkor in 1854), English by Uriah Katzenelenbogen (19 songs published in 1935). Selected songs were republished in various other collections, including by Simonas Daukantas, Georg Heinrich Ferdinand Nesselmann, Nikolai Berg, Christian Bartsch, Vilius Kalvaitis.

Rhesa's study on the folk songs became highly influential and his main ideas were repeated by various authors, including by Adam Mickiewicz, Kazimierz Brodziński, Józef Ignacy Kraszewski, Franciszek Zatorski, Józef Jaroszewicz.

The songs from Rhesa's collection inspired several artists to create Lithuanian-themed works, including poet Julius Zeyer, composer Antonín Dvořák (song for male choir), writer Carl Friedrich Wilhelm Jordan (about 30 song-inspired texts), poet Adelbert von Chamisso (five poems), author Józef Ignacy Kraszewski (borrowed elements for epic poem Anafielas).

The songs were also used by researchers in other fields. For example, Friedrich Kurschat and August Schleicher used the collection in their linguistic studies of the Lithuanian language. Historian Teodor Narbutt used the songs to describe the Lithuanian mythology in his multi-volume history of Lithuania. Later authors, starting with Aleksander Brückner, expressed doubts whether songs with mythological elements are truly authentic. Albinas Jovaišas suspected that as many as 30 songs had mythological elements artificially inserted by Rhesa when he edited the texts.

==== Other Lithuanian texts ====
In addition to manuscripts by Donelaitis, Rhesa also owned Lithuanian texts by Christian Gottlieb Mielcke and Adam Friedrich Schimmelpfennig. In 1980, researchers discovered a published copy of Mielcke's 332-line Lithuanian poem Pilkainis. The copy is missing publisher's information, but it is believed that the publication was prepared and published by Rhesa around 1820–1825.

In 1824, Rhesa published a 70-page collection of 96 fables by Aesop and Christian Fürchtegott Gellert translated into Lithuanian and six Lithuanian fables by Kristijonas Donelaitis. Rhesa added a Lithuanian introduction which is one of a few original Lithuanian texts authored by him. Unlike other publications, the collection of fables was intended for less educated villagers, therefore the introduction briefly and simply explained was fables are and described biography of Aesop. Donelaitis' fables likely served as an inspiration to the six fables of Simonas Stanevičius published in 1829 (the publication also included Donelaitis' texts).

In 1811, he wrote a history of the 100-year old Lithuanian language seminar at the University of Königsberg in German. The work remained unpublished until a Lithuanian translation was prepared and published in 2003. The work was accompanied by an 81-line Lithuanian poem in dactylic hexameter which was published in 1824. It is a panegyric thanking for teaching Lithuanian language, criticizing the pope, and praising Martin Luther, Duke Albert, and King Frederick William I. Another Lithuanian panegyric by Rhesa was published in 1816 and 1818. His poem praising King Frederick William III of Prussia, Tsar Alexander I of Russia, Emperor Francis I of Austria for their victory over Napoleon was included in an ornate publication with poems in 43 languages celebrating the victory.

Rhesa had more Lithuanian texts which remained unpublished, including numerous Lithuanian folk songs and proverbs. He compiled an unfinished German–Lithuanian dictionary of spoken language based on Donelaitis' texts and Lithuanian folklore. Surviving records show that he drafted content for the letters B, D, G, I, J. Rhesa also attempted to recruit Endrikis Budrius to write a history of Lithuania in Lithuanian.

=== German publications ===
==== Poetry ====
Rhesa wrote poetry from at least 1797. The first six poems were published in 1799. Rhesa published two volumes of Prutena, oder preussische Volkslieder (Prutena, or Prussian Folk Songs), a collection of 61 Germans poems in 1809 and 41 poems in 1825. The poems often feature elements from the history of Lithuania, mythology, or folklore. Rhesa did not distinguish Prussian Lithuanians from Lithuanians and thus wrote about all Lithuanians. He idealized history, portrayed Old Prussians as noble people who valued freedom more than life. At the same time, Rhesa expressed loyalty to the Kingdom of Prussia. For example, he praised Prussian commander Gebhard Leberecht von Blücher and Louise, Queen of Prussia. He also lovingly described everyday village people and serene scenes of nature. One of his poems, a sentimental elegy, describes his native village which was buried by shifting sand dunes. Some of his poems are love stories, for example Adam and Eve, Grand Duke Vytautas and Anna, a young warrior who was killed in the Battle of Grunwald, a young fisherman.

His poetry reflected classicism and many of his poems are idylls (his favorite was Ancient Greek poet Theocritus). However, he was also influenced by romantic poetry and sentimentalism. A few of his poems are ballads. A few poems borrowed elements from Lithuanian folk songs, but overall elements from the classical antiquity are dominant. Prutena's title alluded to folk songs perhaps following the example of the poems by Ossian. The collection includes 22 poems that are described as Lithuanian folk songs, but only six are authentic songs, others are imitations. Rhesa's poetry reflects his values – quiet resignation to the greater power or destiny. Life's purpose is to add a little crumb to the greatness built by others. His poetry lacks imagination, depth of feeling, originality both in depiction and in expression.

==== Other German texts ====
In 1814, Rhesa published his diary from the military travels through Brandenburg, Pomerania, Berlin, Silesia, Bohemia, France, England in 1813–1814. He focused not on military movements, but on different cultures, national identities, art. He searched for people's soul (Volksseele) as described by Johann Gottfried Herder. A Lithuanian translation was published in 2000.

Rhesa was tasked with continuing a biographical dictionary, first published by Daniel Heinrich Arnoldt in 1777, of all priests in western Prussia. It was published in two volumes in 1834. Rhesa also wrote a 1,074-page manuscript on the history of the Catholic Church. It was used for his lectures and was revised as late as 1839. He also left a 672-page manuscript on the Gospels of Matthew and John.

== Bibliography ==
- Aleknavičienė, Ona (2019). "Asmeninis Martyno Liudviko Rėzos archyvas: rekonstrukcija". Knygotyra (in Lithuanian). 73: 113–202. doi:10.15388/Knygotyra.2019.73.37. ISSN 0204-2061. S2CID 212829507.
- Atodangos (30 August 2020). "Prieš 180 metų mirė Liudvikas Rėza" (in Lithuanian). 8 diena.
- Balsys, Rimantas (2001). "Dėl vienos L. Rėzos dainos autentiškumo". Tiltai. Priedas (in Lithuanian). 5: 11–17. ISSN 1648-3979.
- Biržiška, Vaclovas (1990) [1963]. Aleksandrynas: senųjų lietuvių rašytojų, rašiusių prieš 1865 m., biografijos, bibliografijos ir biobibliografijos (in Lithuanian). Vol. II (2nd ed.). Vilnius: Sietynas. OCLC 28707188.
- Citavičiūtė, Liucija (2007). "Martynas Liudvika Rėza - lietuvių raštijos ir rašto kultūros puoselėtojas Karaliaučiaus universitete" (PDF). In Strakauskaitė, Nijolė; Pocytė, Silva (eds.). Martynas Liudvikas Rėza: epochų atspindžiai (in Lithuanian). Klaipėda: Klaipėdos universiteto leidykla. ISBN 9789955182078.
- Citavičiūtė, Liucija (2009). "Martynas Liudvikas Rėza ir jo Filologinės-kritinės pastabos lietuviškai Biblijai". Senoji Lietuvos literatūra (in Lithuanian). 28: 93–303. ISSN 1822-3656.
- Citavičiūtė, Liucija (2013). "Martynas Liudvikas Rėza ir pirmoji lietuvių grožinės literatūros publikavimo programa Prūsijos Lietuvoje". Acta Historica Universitatis Klaipedensis (in Lithuanian). XXVI: 112–125. doi:10.15181/ahuk.v26i0.511. ISSN 1392-4095.
- Citavičiūtė, Liucija (2017). "Vokiečių ir lenkų recenzentų žvilgsnis į M. L. Rėzos parengtą lietuvių dainų rinkinį Dainos (1825)". Tautosakos Darbai (in Lithuanian). 54: 148–202. doi:10.51554/TD.2017.28530. ISSN 1392-2831. S2CID 253545032.
- Citavičiūtė, Liucija (2018). "Martyno Liudviko Rėzos Veimaro rankraštis". Tautosakos Darbai (in Lithuanian). 55: 60–81. doi:10.51554/TD.2018.28499. ISSN 1392-2831. S2CID 253545051.
- Citavičiūtė, Liucija (2019). "Martyno Liudviko Rėzos susirašinėjimas su lietuvių dainų rinkėjais provincijoje". Knygotyra (in Lithuanian). 72: 183–205. doi:10.15388/Knygotyra.2019.72.25. ISSN 0204-2061. S2CID 199282089.
- Citavičiūtė, Liucija; Kaunas, Domas; Gustaitis, Algirdas; Kšanienė, Daiva (2009). "Martynas Liudvikas Rėza". Mažosios Lietuvos enciklopedija (in Lithuanian). Mokslo ir enciklopedijų leidybos centras.
- Girdzijauskas, Juozas, ed. (2001). Lietuvių literatūros istorija: XIX amžius (in Lithuanian). Vilnius: Lietuvių literatūros ir tautosakos institutas. ISBN 9986513693.
- Jovaišas, Albinas (1969). Liudvikas Rėza (PDF) (in Lithuanian). Vilnius: Vaga. OCLC 1422171.
- Kaunas, Domas (2001). "Lietuviškas Liudviko Rėzos eilėraštis "Prasta giesmele" (1816)" (PDF). Archivum Lithuanicum (in Lithuanian). 3. ISSN 1392-737X.
- Lebedys, Jurgis (1972). Lituanistikos baruose (in Lithuanian). Vol. 2. Vilnius: Vaga. OCLC 1049923.
- Petkūnas, Darius (29 July 2022) [2018]. "Martynas Liudvikas Rėza". Visuotinė lietuvių enciklopedija (in Lithuanian). Mokslo ir enciklopedijų leidybos centras.
- Rekašiūtė, Kotryna (2018). "Kai kurie Martyno Liudviko Rėzos masoniškų ryšių aspektai ir lituanistinė veikla". Res Humanitariae (in Lithuanian). 24 (2): 121–140. doi:10.15181/rh.v24i0.1910. ISSN 1822-7708. S2CID 166480713.
- Rėza, Liudvikas (2000). Pociūtė, Dainora (ed.). Žinios ir pastabos apie 1813 ir 1814 metų karo žygius iš vieno Prūsijos armijos kapeliono dienoraščio: mūšių, kurių liudininku teko būti pačiam autoriui, aprašymai (in Lithuanian). Vilnius: Lietuvių literatūros ir tautosakos institutas. ISBN 9986513863.
- Sabaliauskas, Algirdas (2006). "Prisiminkime Fridrichą Kuršaitį" (PDF). Tautosakos darbai (in Lithuanian). XXXI: 251–255. ISSN 1392-2831.
- Sliužinskas, Rimantas (2007), "Martyno Liudviko Rėzos dainos oder Litthauische volkslieder : interpretacijos stereotipai ir naujovės", in Strakauskaitė, Nijolė; Pocytė, Silva (eds.), Martynas Liudvikas Rėza: epochų atspindžiai (in Lithuanian), Klaipėda: Klaipėdos universiteto leidykla, ISBN 9789955182078
- Zinkevičius, Zigmas (1990). Lietuvių kalbos istorija (in Lithuanian). Vol. IV. Mokslas. ISBN 5-420-00661-8.
