= Dactylic hexameter =

Poetic meter consisting of six feet

Dactylic hexameter is a form of meter commonly used in both Ancient Greek and Latin poetry. The best known use is for epic poems, such as Homer's Iliad and Odyssey and Virgil's Aeneid, but it was also used for didactic and pastoral poetry in both languages, and in Latin for satire. It is also combined with a dactylic pentameter to make elegiac couplets, used in Greek for elegies and epigrams, and, especially in Latin, for love poetry.

The name dactylic is derived from Greek δάκτυλος (dáktulos), "finger", referring to the basic rhythm of one long and two short syllables (resembling the long and two short bones of a finger). Hexameter comes from Greek ἕξ (héx), "six", because the line consists of six feet. The first five feet contain either a dactyl (a long and two short syllables, written – ᴗ ᴗ) or a spondee (two long syllables, written – –). The last foot contains either a spondee or a long syllable followed by one short syllable, a trochee (– ᴗ). The six feet and their variation is symbolically represented below:

1	|	2	|	3	|	4	|	5	|	6
– ᴗ ᴗ	|	– ᴗ ᴗ	|	– ᴗ ᴗ	|	– ᴗ ᴗ	|	– ᴗ ᴗ	|	– x

== Genre ==
The hexameter is traditionally associated with classical epic poetry in both Greek and Latin. Consequently, it has been considered to be the grand style of Western classical poetry. Examples of epics in hexameter are Homer's Iliad and Odyssey, Apollonius of Rhodes's Argonautica, Virgil's Aeneid, Lucan's Pharsalia, Valerius Flaccus's Argonautica, and Statius's Thebaid.

The meter also had a wide use outside of epic. Greek works in dactylic hexameter include Hesiod's didactic Works and Days and Theogony, some of Theocritus's Idylls, and Callimachus's hymns. In Latin famous works include Lucretius's philosophical De rerum natura, Virgil's pastoral Eclogues, the same author's Georgics (a work on farming), Ovid's Metamorphoses (a collection of mythological stories), book 10 of Columella's manual on agriculture, the Astronomica (a work on astrology attributed to Marcus Manilius), as well as satirical works of Lucilius, Horace, Persius, and Juvenal. Later the hexameter continued to be used in Christian times, for example in the Carmen paschale of the 5th-century Irish poet Sedulius and Bernard of Cluny's 12th-century satire De contemptu mundi among many others.

Dactylic hexameters were also often paired with dactylic pentameters to make a form known as an elegiac couplet.. Elegiac couplets were used in Greek for funeral elegies, and poems on war, politics, love, and other themes. In Latin they were used for love poetry by Propertius, Tibullus, and Ovid, for Ovid's letters from exile, and for many of the epigrams of Catullus and Martial.

== Structure ==
Dactylic hexameter poetry consists of lines, which are divided into feet and further divided into syllables.

=== Feet ===
A hexameter verse contains six feet. The first five feet can be either a dactyl or a spondee Because Latin is much richer in long syllables than Greek, spondaic feet are more common in Latin hexameter. In both Greek and Latin hexameter the fifth foot is usually a dactyl, and a spondee is also rare in the third foot in Greek hexameter. The sixth foot can be filled by either a trochee or a spondee. Thus a dactylic hexameter line is scanned as follows:

— ᴗ ᴗ | — ᴗ ᴗ | — ᴗ ᴗ | — ᴗ ᴗ | — ᴗ ᴗ | — ×

An example of this in Latin is the first line of Virgil's Aeneid:

arma virumque canō, Troiae quī prīmus ab ōrīs
"I sing of arms, and of the man who first from the shores of Troy ..."

The scansion is generally marked as follows, by placing long and short marks above the central vowel of each syllable:

— ᴗ ᴗ	|	— ᴗ ᴗ	|	— —	|	— —	|	— ᴗ ᴗ	|	— —
ar ma vi	|	rum que ca	|	nō Troi	|	ae quī	|	prī mus ab	|	ō rīs
dactyl	|	dactyl	|	spondee	|	spondee	|	dactyl	|	spondee

In dactylic verse, short syllables always come in pairs, so words such as mīlitēs "soldiers" or facilius "more easily" cannot be used in a hexameter, although the substitutes "warrior" and "easier" could be.

=== Syllables ===
Unlike English verse, which is based on stress, ancient Greek and Latin poetry is based on the length, i.e. relative duration, of a syllable. In scansion only the sounds are meaningful, and word boundaries do not matter.

In Greek, a long syllable is called συλλαβὴ μακρά (sullabḕ makrá) and a short syllable is called συλλαβὴ βραχεῖα (sullabḕ brakheîa). In Latin the terms are syllaba longa and syllaba brevis.

==== Greek ====
In Greek, a syllable is long if it contains a long vowel, a diphthong, or two consonants follow the vowel(s) of the syllable. That is to say, a syllable with a short vowel is scanned as long as it contains a long vowel, a diphthong, or if it is closed; and a syllable is closed only if it ends with a consonant, otherwise it is open.

For example, all syllables in μήτηρ, οἰκτείρω, and φλόξ are long. However, there are exceptions to the rules mentioned above.

==== Latin ====
In Latin, a syllable is long (by nature) if it contains a long vowel or a diphthong and long (by position) if it contains a short vowel followed by two consonants, even if these are in different words.. For example, all syllables in Ae-nē-ās and au-rō are long by nature, whereas et, ter, tot, and vol in et terrīs, tot vol-ve-re are long by position.

However, when a liquid — l or r — follows a plosive, a syllable containing a short vowel may remain short by position. For example, pa-trem could be scanned either as having a short first syllable pa-trem or as having a long first syllable pat-rem.

In scansion the letter h is ignored, and qu counts as a single consonant. So, for example in the phrase et horret the syllable et remains short, and in the word aqua the first syllable remains short too.

The semiconsonantal i and u are scanned as consonants. For example, in Iuppiter and iēcit, i is considered a consonant, pronounced like the English y. Thus Iup-pi-ter has three syllables and iē-cit has two. But, in I-ū-lius the first I is a vowel and forms a separate syllable. Additionally, an i between two or more vowels stands almost without exception for a double consonant; so, for example a-io, standing for a-iio has two syllables.

In some editions of Latin texts the consonant v is written as u, in which case u is also often consonantal. This can sometimes cause ambiguity; e.g., in the word uoluit (= vol-vit) "he rolls" the second u is a consonant, but in uoluit (= vo-lu-it) "he wanted" the second u is a vowel.

=== Elision ===
In Latin, when a word ends in a vowel or -m and is followed by a word starting with a vowel or h, the last vowel is usually suppressed or elided. For example, poss(e) Ītalia; Teucrōr(um) āvertere, monstr(um) horrendum.

In Greek, short vowels elide freely; however, long vowels are not elided, though they may be shortened in some cases.: E.g. Πηληϊάδεω Ἀχιλῆος (Pēlēïádeō Akhilêos)

In modern Greek writing the elision is shown by an apostrophe. For example:

ἣ μυρί᾽ Ἀχαιοῖς ἄλγε᾽ ἔθηκε

hḕ murí᾽ Akhaioîs álge᾽ éthēke

which caused countless sufferings for the Achaeans

— Homer, Iliad, 1.2

The Greek style of not eliding a long vowel is sometimes imitated in Latin for special effect, for example, fēmineō ululātu "with womanly wailing" (Aen. 9.477).

When a vowel is elided, it does not count in the scansion. So, for the purposes of scansion, Iu-n(o) ae-ter-num has four syllables.

=== Caesura ===
A caesura is a word break in the middle of a foot or metron. In Greek hexameter there is a caesura after i) the first syllable of the 3rd foot, a strong or masculine caesura, ii) the second syllable of a dactyl in the 3rd foot, a weak or feminine caesura, or iii) the first syllable of the 4th foot; the first two being more common than the last. In Latin hexameter the weak caesura is rarer than in Greek hexameter. On the one hand, in Virgil the strong caesura is found in ca. 85% of the time.

An example of a weak caesura can be found from the first line of Homer's Odyssey:

ἄνδρα μοι / ἔννεπε, / μοῦσα, πο/λύτροπον, / ὃς μάλα / πολλὰ
ándra moi / énnepe, / moûsa, po/lútropon, / hòs mála / pollà
"Tell me, Muse, of the man of many wiles, who very much"

And an example of a strong caesura follows on the next line of the Odyssey:

πλάγχθη, ἐ/πεὶ Τροί/ης ἱερ/ὸν πτολί/εθρον ἔ/περσεν:
plánkhthē, e/peì Troí/ēs hier/òn ptolí/ethron é/persen:
"wandered, after having sacked the sacred citadel of Troy."

In Latin (but not in Greek, as the above example shows), a feminine caesura in the 3rd foot is usually accompanied with masculine caesuras in the 2nd and especially in the 4th feet:

infan/dum, re/gina, iu/bes reno/vare do/lorem
"You are bidding me, o queen, to renew an unspeakable sorrow"

Sometimes caesuras in the 2nd and 4th feet of a line make do, and there is no caesura in the 3rd foot. For example:

inde to/ro pater / Aene/as sic / orsus ab / alto
"then from his high couch Father Aeneas began as follows"

== In Greek ==
The hexameter was first used by early Greek poets of the oral tradition, and the most complete extant examples of their works are the Iliad and the Odyssey, which influenced the authors of all later classical epics that survive today. Early epic poetry was also accompanied by music, and pitch changes associated with the accented Greek must have highlighted the melody, though the exact mechanism is still a topic of discussion.

The first line of Homer's Iliad provides an example:

μῆνιν ἄειδε, θεά, Πηληϊάδεω Ἀχιλῆος
mênin áeide, theá, Pēlēïádeō Akhilêos
"Sing, goddess, the anger of Peleus' son Achilles"

Dividing the line into metrical units or feet it can be scanned as follows:

μῆ-νιν ἄ / ει-δε, θε / ά, Πη / λη-ϊ-ά / δεω Ἀ-χι / λῆ-ος
mê-nin á / ei-de, the / á, Pē / lē-ï-á / deō A-khi / lê-os (-deō is one syllable)
— ∪ ∪ | — ∪ ∪ | — — | — ∪ ∪ | — ∪ ∪ | — —

This line also includes a masculine caesura after θεά, a break that separates the line into two parts. Homer employs a feminine caesura more commonly than later writers. An example occurs in Iliad 1.5:

οἰωνοῖσί τε πᾶσι, Διὸς δ’ ἐτελείετο βουλή
"... and every bird; and the plan of Zeus was fulfilled"

οἰ-ω / νοῖ-σί τε / πᾶ-σι, Δι / ὸς δ’ ἐ-τε / λεί-ε-το / βου-λή,
oi-ō / noî-sí te / pâ-si, Di / òs d’ e-te / leí-e-to / bou-lḗ,
— — | — ∪ ∪ | — ∪, ∪ | — ∪ ∪ | — ∪ ∪ | — —

Homer's hexameters contain a higher proportion of dactyls than later hexameter poetry. They are also characterized by a laxer following of verse principles than later epicists almost invariably adhered to. For example, Homer allows spondaic fifth feet (albeit not often), whereas many later authors do not.

Homer also altered the forms of words to allow them to fit the hexameter, typically by using a dialectal form: ptolis is an epic form used instead of the Attic polis as necessary for the meter. Proper names sometimes take forms to fit the meter, for example Pouludamas instead of the metrically unviable Poludamas.

Some lines require a knowledge of the digamma for their scansion, e.g. Iliad 1.108:

ἐσθλὸν δ’ οὐτέ τί πω εἶπας ἔπος οὔτ’ ἐτέλεσσας
esthlòn d’ outé tí pō eîpas épos oút’ etélessas
"you have not yet spoken a good word nor brought one to pass"

ἐσ-θλὸν / δ’ οὐ-τέ τί / πω εἶ/πας ἔ-πος / οὔτ’ ἐ-τέ / λεσ-σας
es-thlòn / d’ ou-té tí / pō eî/pas é-pos / oút’ e-té / les-sas
— — | — ∪ ∪ | — — | — ∪ ∪ | — ∪ ∪ | — —

Here the word ἔπος (epos) was originally ϝέπος (wepos) in Ionian; the digamma, later lost, lengthened the last syllable of the preceding εἶπας (eipas) and removed the apparent defect in the meter. A digamma also saved the hiatus in the third foot. This example demonstrates the oral tradition of the Homeric epics that flourished before they were written down sometime in the 7th century BC.

Most of the later rules of hexameter composition have their origins in the methods and practices of Homer.

== In Latin ==
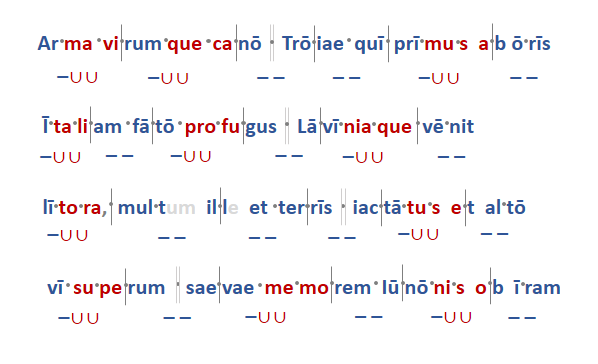
Diagramming of the opening lines of the Aeneid

The dactylic hexameter was adapted from Greek to Latin. Though the metre was taken from Greek unaltered, the Latin language has a higher proportion of long syllables than Greek, and so it is by nature more spondaic. Additionally, the Roman poets did not avoid the weak caesura in the fourth foot as much as the Greeks did.

=== Ennius ===
The earliest example of hexameter in Latin poetry is the panegyric history of Rome, Annales, by Ennius, establishing a standard for later Latin epics. Ennius experimented with different kinds of lines, for example, lines with five dactyls:

tum tuba / terribi/li soni/tu tara/tantara / dixit
"Then the trumpet with terrifying sound went 'taratantara!'"

or lines consisting entirely of spondees:

olli / respon/dit rex / Alba/i Lon/gai
"To him replied the king of Alba Longa"

lines without a caesura:

sparsis / hastis / longis / campus / splendet et / horret
"With scattered long spears the plain gleams and bristles"

lines ending in a one-syllable word or in words of more than three syllables:

unus ho/mo no/bis cunc/tando / restitu/it rem
"A single man, by delaying, restored the situation for us."

nec m(i) au/rum pos/co nec /mi preti/um dede/ritis
non cau/ponan/tes bel/lum sed / bellige/rantes
"I do not demand gold for myself nor should you give me a price:
not buying and selling war, but waging it"

or even lines starting with two short syllables:

melanu/rum, tur/dum, meru/lamqu(e) um/bramque ma/rinam
| u u – | – – | –, u u | – – | – u u | – –
"the blacktail, the rainbow wrasse, the bird wrasse, and the maigre" (kinds of fish)

However, most of these features were abandoned by later writers or used only occasionally for special effect.

=== Later writers ===
Later Republican writers, such as Lucretius, Catullus, and even Cicero, wrote hexameter compositions, and it was at this time that the principles of Latin hexameter were firmly established and followed by later writers such as Virgil, Horace, Ovid, Lucan, and Juvenal. Virgil's opening line for the Aeneid is a classic example:

Arma vi/rumque ca/nō, Trō/iae quī/ prīmus ab/ ōrīs
"I sing of arms and of the man who first from the shores of Troy ..."

In Latin, lines were arranged so that the metrically long syllables — those occurring at the beginning of a foot — often avoided the natural stress of a word. In the earlier feet of a line, meter and stress were expected to clash, while in the last two feet they were expected to coincide, as in prímus ab/ óris above. The coincidence of word accent and meter in the last two feet could be achieved by restricting the last word to one of two or three syllables.

Most lines (about 85% in Virgil) have a caesura or word division after the first syllable of the 3rd foot, as above ca/nō. Because of the penultimate accent in Latin, this ensures that the word accent and meter will not coincide in the 3rd foot. But in those lines with a feminine or weak caesura, such as the following, there is inevitably a coincidence of meter and accent in the 3rd foot:

insequi/tur cla/mórque vi/rum stri/dórque ru/déntum
"there follows shouting of men and rattling of ropes"

To offset this, whenever there was a feminine caesura in the 3rd foot, there was usually also a masculine caesura in the 2nd and 4th feet, to ensure that in those feet at least, the word accent and meter did not coincide.

=== Metrical effects ===
By the age of Augustus, poets like Virgil closely followed the rules of the meter and approached it in a highly rhetorical way, looking for effects that can be exploited in skilled recitation. For example, the following line from the Aeneid (8.596) describes the movement and sound of galloping horses:

quadrupe/dante pu/trem soni/tū quatit/ ungula/ campum
"with four-footed sound the hoof shakes the crumbling plain"

This line is made up of five dactyls and a closing spondee, an unusual rhythmic arrangement that imitates the described action. A different effect is found in 8.452, where Virgil describes how the blacksmith sons of Vulcan forged Aeneas' shield. The five spondees and the word accents cutting across the verse rhythm give an impression of huge effort:

ill(ī) in/ter sē/sē mul/tā vī / bracchia / tollunt
"They with much force raise their arms one after another"

A slightly different effect is found in the following line (3.658), describing the terrifying one-eyed giant Polyphemus, blinded by Ulysses. Here again there are five spondees but there are also three elisions, which cause the word accent of all the words but ingens to coincide with the beginning of each foot:

monstr(um) hor/rend(um), in/form(e), in/gens, cui / lumen a/demptum
"A horrendous huge shapeless monster, whose eye (lit. light) had been removed"

A succession of long syllables in some lines indicates slow movement, as in the following example where Aeneas and his companion the Sibyl (a priestess of Apollo) were entering the darkness of the world of the dead:

ibant / obscu/ri so/la sub / nocte per / umbram
"they were going in the darkness beneath the lonely night through the shadow"

The following example (Aeneid 2.9) describes how Aeneas is reluctant to begin his narrative, since it is already past midnight. The feminine caesura after suadentque without a following 4th-foot caesura ensures that all the last four feet have word accent at the beginning, which is unusual. The monotonous effect is reinforced by the assonance of dent ... dent and the alliteration of S ... S:

... Et / iam nox / umida / caelo
praecipi/tat, sua/déntque ca/déntia / sídera / sómnos.
"And already the moist night is falling from the sky
and the setting constellations are inviting sleep"

Dactyls are associated with sleep again in the following unusual line, which describes the activity of a priestess who is feeding a magic serpent (Aen. 4.486). In this line, there are five dactyls, and every one is accented on the first syllable:

spárgens / úmida / mélla so/pórife/rúmque pa/páver
"sprinkling moist honey and sleep-inducing poppy"

A different technique, at 1.105, is used when describing a ship at sea during a storm. Here Virgil places a single-syllable word at the end of the line. This produces a jarring rhythm that echoes the crash of a large wave against the side of the ship:

... et undīs
dat latus;/ insequi/tur cumu/lo prae/ruptus a/quae mōns.
"(The boat) gives its side to the waves; there immediately follows in a heap a steep mountain of water."

The Roman poet Horace uses a similar trick to highlight the comedic irony in this famous line from his Ars Poetica (line 139):

Parturi/ent mon/tes, nas/cetur/ rīdicu/lus mūs
"The mountains will be in labor, but all that will be born is a ridiculous ... mouse"

Usually in Latin the 5th foot of a hexameter is a dactyl. However, in his poem 64, Catullus several times uses a 5th foot spondee, which gives a Greek flavour to his verse, as in this line describing the forested Vale of Tempe in northern Greece:

Tempe, / quae sil/vae cin/gunt super /impen/dentes,
"Tempe, which woods surround, hanging over it"

Virgil also occasionally imitates Greek practice, for example, in the first line of his 3rd Eclogue:

dīc mihi, / Dāmoe/tā, cu/ium pecus? // an Meli/boei?
"Tell me, Damoetas, whose cattle are these? Are they Meliboeus's?"

Here there is a break in sense after a 4th-foot dactyl, a feature known as a bucolic diaeresis, because it is frequently used in Greek pastoral poetry. In fact it is common in Homer too (as in the first line of the Odyssey quoted above), but rare in Latin epic.

=== Stylistic features of epic ===
Certain stylistic features are characteristic of epic hexameter poetry, especially as written by Virgil.

==== Enjambment ====
Hexameters are frequently enjambed—the meaning runs over from one line to the next, without terminal punctuation—which helps to create the long, flowing narrative of epic. Sentences can also end in different places in the line, for example, after the first foot. In this, classical epic differs from medieval Latin, where the lines are often composed individually, with a break in sense at the end of each one.

==== Poetic vocabulary ====
Often in poetry ordinary words are replaced by poetic ones, for example unda or lympha for water, aequora for sea, puppis for ship, amnis for river, and so on. Some ordinary Latin words are avoided, e.g. audiunt, mīlitēs, hominibus, facilius, mulierēs, familiae, voluptātibus etc., simply because they do not fit into a hexameter verse.

==== Hyperbaton ====
It is common in poetry for adjectives to be widely separated from their nouns, and quite often one adjective–noun pair is interleaved with another. This feature is known as hyperbaton "stepping over". An example is the opening line of Lucan's epic on the Civil War:

bella per Emathios – plus quam civilia – campos
"Wars through the Emathian – more than civil – plains"

Another example is the opening of Ovid's mythological poem Metamorphoses where the word nova "new" is in a different line from corpora "bodies" which it describes:

in nova fert animus mutatas dicere formas / corpora (Ovid, Metamorphoses 1.1)
"My spirit leads me to tell of forms transformed into new bodies."

One particular arrangement of words that seems to have been particularly admired is the golden line, a line which contains two adjectives, a verb, and two nouns, with the first adjective corresponding to the first noun such as:

barbaraqu(e) horribili stridebat tibia cantu
"and the barbarian pipe was strident with horrible music"

Catullus was the first to use this kind of line, as in the above example. Later authors used it rarely (1% of lines in Ovid), but in silver Latin it became increasingly popular.

==== Alliteration and assonance ====
Virgil in particular used alliteration and assonance frequently, although it is much less common in Ovid. Often more than one consonant was alliterated and not necessarily at the beginning of words, for example:

at ReGina GRavi iamdudum sauCia Cura
VuLNus aLit VeNis et CaeCo Carpitur igni.
"But the queen, now long wounded by grave anxiety,
feeds the wound in her veins and is tormented by an unseen fire"

Also in Virgil:

LoCa NoCTe TaCeNTia LaTe "places silent with night everywhere"
iLLae Remis VaDa LiViDa VeRRunt "those ones with oars sweep the dark shallows"

Sometimes the same vowel is repeated:

mē, mē, adsum qui fēci, in mē convertite ferrum
"on me, me, I who did it am here, turn your swords on me!"

nec frena remittit, / nec retiNere valet, Nec Nomina Novit equorum
"he does not let go of the reins, but he is not strong enough to hold them back, and he does not know the names of the horses"

==== Rhetorical techniques ====
Rhetorical devices such as anaphora, antithesis, and rhetorical questions are frequently used in epic poetry. Tricolon is also common:

haec omnis, quam cernis, inops inhumataque turba est;
portitor ille Charon; hi, quos vehit unda, sepulti.
"All this crowd that you see, are the poor and unburied;
that ferryman is Charon; these, that the wave is carrying, are the buried."

==== Genre of subject matter ====
The poems of Homer, Virgil, and Ovid often vary their narrative with speeches. Well known examples are the speech of Queen Dido cursing Aeneas in book 4 of the Aeneid, the lament of the nymph Juturna when she is unable to save her brother Turnus in book 12 of the Aeneid, and the quarrel between Ajax and Ulysses over the arms of Achilles in book 13 of Ovid's Metamorphoses. Some speeches are themselves narratives, as when Aeneas tells Queen Dido about the fall of Troy and his voyage to Africa in books 2 and 3 of the Aeneid. Other styles of writing include vivid descriptions, such as Virgil's description of the god Charon in Aeneid 6, or Ovid's description of Daedalus's labyrinth in book 8 of the Metamorphoses; similes, such as Virgil's comparison of the souls of the dead to autumn leaves or clouds of migrating birds in Aeneid 6; and lists of names, such as when Ovid names 36 of the dogs who tore their master Actaeon to pieces in book 3 of the Metamorphoses.

=== Conversational style ===
Raven divides the various styles of the hexameter in classical Latin into three types: the early stage (Ennius), the fully developed type (Cicero, Catullus, Virgil, and Ovid, with Lucretius about midway between Ennius and Cicero), and the conversational type, especially Horace, but also to an extent Persius and Juvenal. One feature which marks these off is their often irregular line endings (for example, words of one syllable) and also the very conversational, un-epic style. Horace in fact called his satires sermones ("conversations"). The word order and vocabulary is much as might be expected in prose. An example is the opening of the 9th satire of book 1:

Ibam forte Via Sacra, sicut meus est mos,
nescio quid meditans nugarum, totus in illis:
accurrit quidam notus mihi nomine tantum:
arreptaque manu, 'quid agis, dulcissime rerum?'

"I was walking by chance along the Sacred Way, as is my custom,
meditating on some trifle or other, completely absorbed in it,
when suddenly up ran a certain person known to me by name only.
He grabbed my hand and said 'How are you, sweetest of things?'"

=== Silver Age and Late Empire ===
The verse innovations of the Augustan writers were carefully imitated by their successors in the Silver Age of Latin literature. The verse form itself then was little changed as the quality of a poet's hexameter was judged against the standard set by Virgil and the other Augustan poets, a respect for literary precedent encompassed by the Latin word aemulātiō. Deviations were generally regarded as idiosyncrasies or hallmarks of personal style and were not imitated by later poets. Juvenal, for example, was fond of occasionally creating verses that placed a sense break between the fourth and fifth foot (instead of in the usual caesura positions), but this technique—known as the bucolic diaeresis—did not catch on with other poets.

In the late empire, writers experimented again by adding unusual restrictions to the standard hexameter. The rhopalic verse of Ausonius is a good example; besides following the standard hexameter pattern, each word in the line is one syllable longer than the previous, e.g.:

Spēs, deus, / aeter/nae stati/ōnis / concili/ātor,
sī cas/tīs preci/bus veni/ālēs / invigi/lāmus,
hīs, pater, / ōrā/tis plā/cābili/s adstipu/lāre.

"O God, Hope of Eternal Life, Conciliator,
if, with chaste entreaties, hoping for pardon, we keep vigil,
look kindly on us and grant these prayers."

Also notable is the tendency among late grammarians to thoroughly dissect the hexameters of Virgil and earlier poets. A treatise on poetry by Diomedes Grammaticus is a good example, as this work categorizes dactylic hexameter verses in ways that were later interpreted under the golden line rubric. Independently, these two trends show the form becoming highly artificial—more like a puzzle to solve than a medium for personal poetic expression.

=== Middle Ages ===
By the Middle Ages, some writers adopted more relaxed versions of the meter. Bernard of Cluny, in the 12th century, for example, employs it in his De Contemptu Mundi, but ignores classical conventions in favor of accentual effects and predictable rhyme both within and between verses, e.g.:

Hora no/vissima, / tempora / pessima / sunt: vigi/lemus.
Ecce mi/naciter / imminet / arbiter / ille su/premus.
Imminet / imminet / ut mala / terminet, / aequa co/ronet,
Recta re/muneret, / anxia / liberet, / aethera / donet.

"These are the last days, the worst of times: let us keep watch.
Behold the menacing arrival of the supreme Judge.
He is coming, he is coming to end evil, to crown just actions,
Reward what is right, free us from anxieties, and give the heavens."

Not all medieval writers are so at odds with the Virgilian standard, and with the rediscovery of classical literature, later Medieval and Renaissance writers are far more orthodox, but by then the form had become an academic exercise. Petrarch, for example, devoted much time to his Africa, a dactylic hexameter epic on Scipio Africanus, completed in 1341, but this work was unappreciated in his time and remains little read today. It begins as follows:

Et michi / conspicu/um meri/tis bel/loque tre/mendum,
Musa, vi/rum refe/res, Ita/lis cui / fracta sub / armis
Nobilis / eter/num prius / attulit / Africa / nomen.

"To me also, o Muse, tell of the man,
conspicuous for his merits and fearsome in war,
to whom noble Africa, broken beneath Italian arms,
first gave its eternal name."

In contrast, Dante decided to write his epic, the Divine Comedy in Italian—a choice that defied the traditional choice of writing epics in Latin dactylic hexameters—producing a masterpiece beloved both then and now.

With the Neo-Latin period, the language itself came to be regarded as a medium only for serious and learned expression, a view that left little room for Latin poetry. The emergence of Recent Latin in the 20th century restored classical orthodoxy among Latinists and sparked a general (if still academic) interest in the beauty of Latin poetry. Today, the modern Latin poets who use the dactylic hexameter are generally as faithful to Virgil as Rome's Silver Age poets.

== In modern languages ==
=== In English ===
Many poets have attempted to write dactylic hexameters in English, though few works composed in the meter have stood the test of time. Most such works are accentual rather than quantitative. Perhaps the most famous is Longfellow's "Evangeline", whose first lines are as follows:

"This is the / forest pri/meval. The / murmuring / pines and the / hemlocks
Bearded with / moss, and in / garments / green, indis/tinct in the / twilight,
Stand like / Druids of / eld, with / voices / sad and pro/phetic..."

Contemporary poet Annie Finch wrote her epic libretto Among the Goddesses in dactylic tetrameter, which she claims is the most accurate English accentual equivalent of dactylic hexameter. Poets who have written quantitative hexameters in English include Robert Bridges and Rodney Merrill, whose translation of part of the Iliad begins as follows (see External links below):

"Sing now, / goddess, the / wrath of A/chilles the / scion of / Peleus,
Ruinous / rage, which / brought the A/chaeans un/counted af/flictions;
Many the / powerful / souls it / sent to the / dwelling of / Hades..."

Although the rules seem simple, it is hard to use classical hexameter in English because English is a stress-timed language that condenses vowels and consonants between stressed syllables, while hexameter relies on the regular timing of the phonetic sounds. Languages having the latter properties (i.e., languages that are not stress-timed) include Ancient Greek, Latin, Lithuanian and Hungarian.

=== In German ===
Dactylic hexameter has proved more successful in German than in most modern languages. Friedrich Gottlieb Klopstock's epic Der Messias popularized accentual dactylic hexameter in German. Subsequent German poets to employ the form include Goethe (notably in his Reineke Fuchs) and Schiller.

The opening lines of Goethe's Reineke Fuchs ("Reynard the Fox"), written in 1793–1794, are:

Pfingsten, das / liebliche / Fest, war ge/kommen; es / grünten und / blühten
Feld und / Wald; auf / Hügeln und / Höhn, in / Büschen und / Hecken
Übten ein / fröhliches / Lied die / neuer/munterten / Vögel;
Jede / Wiese / sproßte von / Blumen in / duftenden / Gründen,
Festlich / heiter / glänzte der / Himmel und / farbig die / Erde.

"Pentecost, the lovely festival, had come; field and forest
grew green and bloomed; on hills and ridges, in bushes and hedges
The newly encouraged birds practised a merry song;
Every meadow sprouted with flowers in fragrant grounds,
The sky shone festively cheerfully and the earth was colourful."

=== In French ===
Jean-Antoine de Baïf (1532–1589) wrote poems regulated by quantity on the Greco–Roman model, a system which came to be known as vers mesurés, or vers mesurés à l'antique, which the French language of the Renaissance permitted. To do this, he invented a special phonetic alphabet. In works like his Étrénes de poézie Franzoęze an vęrs mezurés (1574) or Chansonnettes he used the dactylic hexameter, and other meters, in a quantitative way.

An example of one of his elegiac couplets is as follows. The final -e of vienne, autre, and regarde is sounded, and the word il is pronounced /i/:

Vienne le / beau Nar/cis, qui ja/mais n'aima / autre si/non soi,
Et qu'il re/garde te/s yeux, // Et, qu'il se / garde d'ai/mer.
| – u u | – – | – u u | – – | – u u | – –
| – u u | – u u | – || – u u | – u u | –
"Let the handsome Narcissus come, who never loved another except himself,
and let him look at your eyes, and let him try not to love you."

A modern attempt at reproducing the dactylic hexameter in French is this one, by André Markowicz (1985), translating Catullus's poem 63. Again the final -e and -es of pères, perfide, and désertes are sounded:

C'est ain/si que tu / m'as arra/chée aux au/tels de mes / pères,
Pour me lais/ser, per/fide Thé/sée, sur ces / rives dé/sertes ...
| – – | – u u | – u u | – u u | – u u | – – |
| – u u | – – | – u u | – u u | – u u | – – |
"Is it for this that you have snatched me from the altars of my ancestors,
to abandon me, traitorous Theseus, on these deserted shores?"

=== In Hungarian ===
Hungarian is extremely suitable to hexameter (and other forms of poetry based on quantitative meter). It has been applied to Hungarian since 1541, introduced by the grammarian János Sylvester.

A hexameter can even occur spontaneously. For example, a student may extricate themselves from failing to remember a poem by saying the following, which is a hexameter in Hungarian:

Itt elakadtam, sajnos nem jut eszembe a többi.
― ∪ ∪ / ― ― / ― ― / ― ∪ ∪ / ― ∪ ∪ / ― ―
"I'm stuck here, unfortunately the rest won't come into my mind."

Sándor Weöres included an ordinary nameplate text in one of his poems (this time, a pentameter):

Tóth Gyula bádogos és vízvezeték-szerelő.
― ∪ ∪ / ― ∪ ∪ / ― // ― ∪ ∪ / ― ∪ ∪ / ―
"Gyula Tóth tinsmith and plumber"

Similar present-day, spontaneous hexameters have been spotted by contemporary poets such as Dániel Varró and János Lackfi:

(on a bar of chocolate)
Tejcsokoládé sárgabarack- és kekszdarabokkal
― ∪ ∪ / ― ― / ― ∪ ∪ / ― ― / ― ∪ ∪ / ― ―
"Milk chocolate with apricot and biscuit bits"

(at a cash desk)
Áfás számla igényét, kérjük, előre jelezze!
― ― / ― ∪ ∪ / ― ― / ― ∪ ∪ / ― ∪ ∪ / ― ―
"Please indicate in advance your need for a VAT invoice."

(at a government customer service counter)
Gépjárművezető-igazolványok kiadása
― ― / ― ∪ ∪ / ― ∪ ∪ / ― ― / ― ∪ ∪ / ― ―
"Issuance of driver’s licenses"

Due to this feature, the hexameter has been widely used both in translated (Greek and Roman) and in original Hungarian poetry up to the twentieth century (e.g. by Miklós Radnóti).

=== In Lithuanian ===
The Seasons (Metai) by Kristijonas Donelaitis is a famous Lithuanian poem in quantitative dactylic hexameters. Because of the nature of Lithuanian, more than half of the lines of the poem are entirely spondaic save for the mandatory dactyl in the fifth foot.

== See also ==
- Latin rhythmic hexameter
- Prosody (Greek)
- Prosody (Latin)
- Meters of Roman comedy
- Trochaic septenarius
- Brevis in longo
- Anceps
- Biceps
- Resolution (meter)
