= The Seasons (poem) =

Lithuanian poem written by Kristijonas Donelaitis

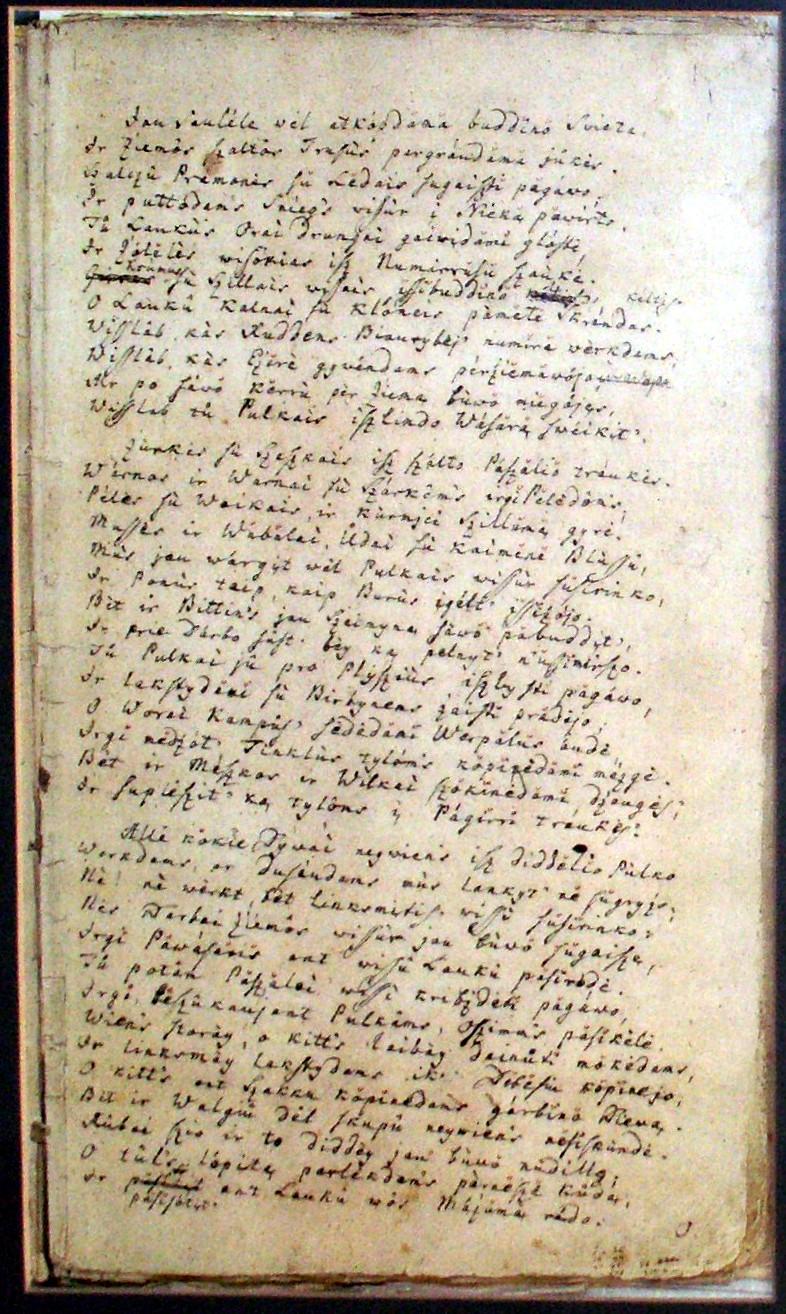
First page of the Donelaitis' manuscript for the part "Spring Joys"

The Seasons (Lithuanian: Metai) is the first Lithuanian poem written by Kristijonas Donelaitis around 1765–1775. It is in quantitative dactylic hexameters as often used for Latin and Ancient Greek poetry. It was published as "Das Jahr" in Königsberg, 1818 by Ludwig Rhesa, who also named the poem and selected the arrangement of the parts. The German translation was included in the first edition of the poem. The book was dedicated to Wilhelm von Humboldt. The poem is considered a masterpiece of early Lithuanian literature.

== Synopsis ==
The poem consists of 4 parts: "Spring Joys" (Pavasario linksmybės), "Summer Toils" (Vasaros darbai), "Autumn Boons" (Rudenio gėrybės), and "Winter Cares" (Žiemos rūpesčiai). In these 4 idylls, totaling 2997 hexameters, are depicted the natural setting of Lithuania Minor, its people, their work, and their customs. The poem depicts a realistic portrayal of Lietuvininkai (Prussian Lithuanians) peasants' life in the middle 18th century, as it was affected by colonization of East Prussia. Germans and Austrians, Swiss and French, brought in and given special consideration by the government, became the upper class of landlords and officials, while the indigenous population became the lower class of serfs. In The Seasons the village life of the latter is depicted as patriarchal in structure. The natural virtues idealized by the Pietist movement, diligence, piety, honesty, and submission to authority, flourish. Social consciousness of the people is largely dormant. There appear only a few characters through whose lips the poet accuses the gentry and the government of exploiting the people. However, such characters are not portrayed sympathetically; they are considered degenerates by the villagers in the poem and by its author. The poet contents himself with telling his readers that all men were created equal in the beginning and that only later did some become lords and others serfs. Donelaitis calls the latter būrai (boors), and shows deep sympathy for them. He reprimands their evil exploiters, but he does not raise any protest against the system of serfdom.

The social contrast coincided with a national and even a moral division. The villagers, who cultivated the aforementioned virtues, were Lithuanian. The immigrant colonists tended to weaken these virtues with their drunkenness and their backsliding from the Church. The poet condemns the imported vices and urges his brother Lithuanians (Lietuvininkai) not to succumb to the novelties but to preserve their traditions, including their language, customs, and dress. In a word he preaches passive resistance, though with some exceptions. The author recognizes certain desirable traits in the newcomers. For instance, he urges Lithuanian women to learn industriousness and other useful virtues from the German women. In the general picture portrayed by the poem it is evident that with the aging and passing of the exponents of the old patriarchal culture the Lithuanian village with its traditions is sinking in the maelstrom of immigrant culture.

== Style ==
The Seasons does not have any single, simple plot, with characters described in detail. The narrative of the poem is often interrupted by asides, didactic passages and lyrical reflections. The characters are sketchy; they are simply good or simply bad, with few nuances. Donelaitis is not giving too detailed description of objects or persons. He shows them in the dynamic of life, acting and speaking, even larger than life. The poet, moreover, knows the psychology of peasant and serf. To this end the poet makes ingenious use of synecdoche. He also employs hyperbole, exaggerating tempo of action, distances, and results to the point of demolishing the bounds of reality and creating a new artistic world.

Donelaitis has nature operating in terms which only a villager’s associations could attribute to it. The picturesque vocabulary of Donelaitis is akin to folklore. He never waters down a phrase, nor does he euphemize, but is able to recreate in words the substantiality of the world and the speech of the rustics he portrays. His diction is crisp and fresh, and - because of its authenticity - simple and dignified. On the other hand, the language is full of unique metaphors, personifications, analogies, and hyperbolas which make it highly poetical.

It is in quantitative dactylic hexameters as often used for Latin and Ancient Greek poetry, but due to the nature of the Lithuanian language it has far fewer dactyls than in Virgil or Homer, and in more than half of the lines the only dactylic foot is the 5th.

== Literary context ==
This poem of Donelaitis did not differ in literary form from fables, poems, and idylls then in vogue in Germany and Europe in general, nor did it depart from the fashion of writing in imitation of the ancient Greek and Roman poets. The Seasons, moreover, followed the literary tendency of the day to portray not cities and aristocrats but rather the natural setting of the village and its inhabitants (for example James Thomson, Albrecht von Haller, Ewald Christian von Kleist, Barthold Heinrich Brockes). In the poem the reader finds a good deal of the didactic element so popular at the time.

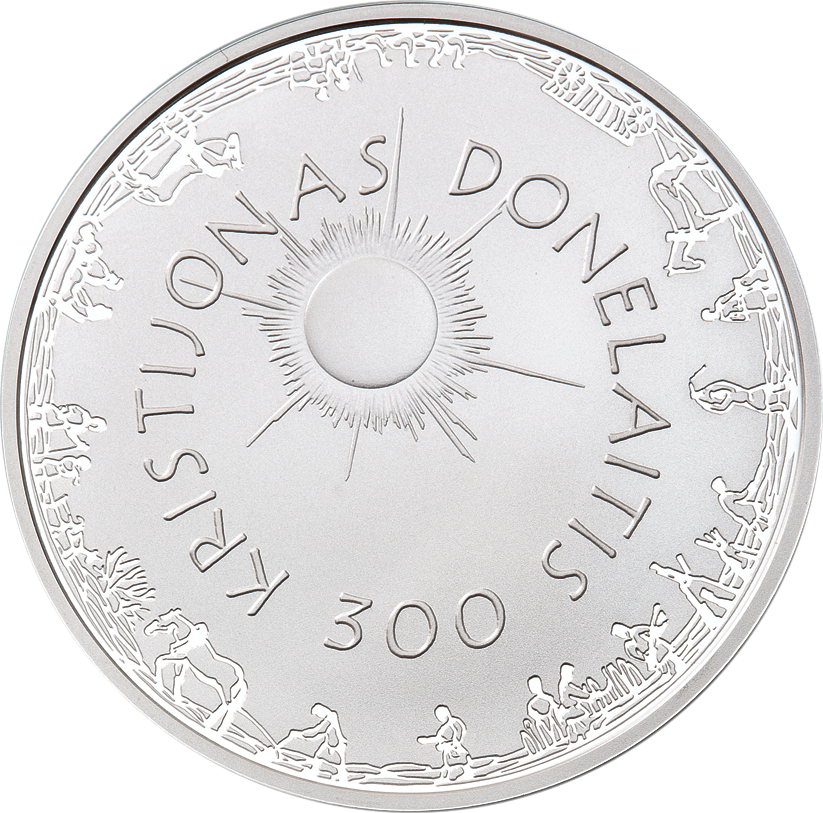
Lithuanian 50 litų coin commemorating the 300th anniversary of Donelaitis' birth, 2014, showing motifs of the poem.

Donelaitis was among the first European writers of the age to employ the classical hexameter. (Friedrich Gottlieb Klopstock, for example, used it in 1748). Furtheron, this Lithuanian poet nature was not conceived in the spirit of the Age of Enlightenment; the peasants he portrayed were not sentimentalized stereotypes. People in The Seasons are drawn realistically, with their labors, experiences, cares, and primitive mentality, abounding with mythology. Thirdly, Donelaitis is characterized by his clear stand in the social, ethnic, and moral clash between the immigrant colonists and the old Lithuanian inhabitants. This was his original contribution.

== Cultural significance ==
The Seasons is the first classical piece of fiction written in the Lithuanian language, the first Lithuanian poem as well as the most successful Lithuanian hexameter piece to date. It has long stepped over the borders of Lithuanian literature: it has been translated into Belarusian, Bulgarian, Czech, English, Finnish, French, Georgian, German, Hungarian, Japanese, Yiddish, Italian, Latvian, Polish, Russian, Romanian and Esperanto. The Seasons (most probably in its German translation) was highly valued by Adam Mickiewicz and has inspired him to write a poem, Konrad Wallenrod. Goethe is also said to have liked the poem.

Acclaimed Lithuanian theatre director Eimuntas Nekrošius has adapted the first and third part of the piece to the performances Donelaitis. Metai. Pavasario linksmybės (Donelaitis.The Seasons.Spring joys) and Donelaitis. Metai. Rudens darbai (Donelaitis.The Seasons.Autumn toils), staged in 2003.
