= Adam Friedrich Schimmelpfennig =

Lutheran pastor known for translating and publishing Lithuanian religious texts

- Born: 25 July 1699; Picktupöhnen (Piktupėnai), Duchy of Prussia
- Died: 22 November 1763 (aged 64); Popelken (Vysokoye), Kingdom of Prussia
- Education: University of Königsberg
- Occupation: Lutheran pastor

Adam Friedrich Schimmelpfennig (Lithuanian: Adomas Fridrichas Šimelpenigis; 1699–1763) was an East Prussian Lutheran pastor known for translating and publishing Lithuanian religious texts. He translated sections of the Old Testament and edited the translation of the Bible into Lithuanian. He also edited a Lithuanian hymnal in which he included his own original hymns. He is sometimes nicknamed "the younger" to distinguish him from his uncle (1677–1740) of the same name.

== Biography ==
Schimmelpfennig hailed from a large family with roots in Holland. The family moved to Prussia in the 15th century due to religious prosecutions.

Schimmelpfennig was born in the village of Picktupöhnen (Piktupėnai in the present-day Pagėgiai Municipality). He enrolled at the University of Königsberg in July 1718. Upon graduation in 1722, he was assigned as precentor to Szillen (Zhilino in the present-day Kaliningrad Oblast). In August 1726, he was ordained as a priest and reassigned as a pastor to Popelken (Vysokoye) where he lived until his death in 1763.

== Works ==
=== Bible translation ===
According to a 1730 plan, Schimmelpfennig was tasked with translating the Book of Joshua and Book of Judges into Lithuanian. This edited translation of the Bible into Lithuanian was sponsored by Johann Jakob Quandt and published in 1735. However, since many people worked on this translation, it was very inconsistent. Schimmelpfennig reedited this edition in an attempt to standardize the translation. The new Bible was published in 1755 with his 192-line poetic preface in which he briefly discussed the history of publishing Lithuanian religious texts in Prussia. However, the two editions were very similar as Schimmelpfennig corrected only individual words.

=== Lithuanian hymns ===
He also translated and wrote original religious hymns. 51 of such hymns were included in the official Lutheran hymnal compiled by Johann Behrendt and published in 1732. After Behrendt's death, Schimmelpfennig published two new editions of this hymnal in 1745 and 1748. These editions combined hymnals by Behrendt and Fabian Ulrich Gläser. In 1750, Schimmelpfennig substantially revamped this hymnal and included 142 new original hymns that he created. His hymns were republished numerous times up until the 19th century. The new hymnal had a total of 542 hymns. While the hymnal was an improvement over its predecessors, it was still written in poor Lithuanian language and poor verse.

=== Poems and other texts ===
In 1753, he published an original German and Lithuanian sermon on the occasion of the ordination of Theodor Gabriel Mielcke. He also wrote commemorative poems and epigrams. Three of his poems survive: poetic preface to the Bible translation (published in 1755), a poem urging his relative to support a student attending the University of Königsberg (private correspondence with rather humorous tone), and a poem on the occasion of the marriage of his daughter (based on a pun on groom's last name, Schimmelpfennig compares the groom to a wolf who wants to steal his sheep/daughter but then discovers that the groom is a priest – a religious shepherd). These poems are one of the first original non-religious texts in Lithuanian. His two surviving epigrams are the first epigrams in Lithuanian literature.

His surviving manuscripts contain seven Lithuanian folk songs written down near Bittehnen (Yagodnoye), but it is unclear whether they were written down by Schimmelpfennig or by someone else.

His manuscript with the translation of Wahres Christentum by Johann Arndt was lost during the Seven Years' War.
