= Bible translations into Lithuanian =

The first known translations of the Bible into the Lithuanian language appeared in the middle of the 16th century following the spread of the Protestant Reformation. The full Protestant Bible was first published in 1735 in Königsberg. The full Roman Catholic translation was published in 1911–1937 in Kaunas.

== Protestant Bibles ==
The first book in Lithuanian, Simple Words of Catechism by Martynas Mažvydas, published in 1547, contained the Ten Commandments, two psalms, and short excerpts from the New Testament. In 1579, Baltramiejus Vilentas published a collection of selected excerpts from the Bible. In 1579–1590, Jonas Bretkūnas completed a translation of the full Luther Bible, but it was not published. Another translation was prepared by Samuel Bogusław Chyliński in Oxford in 1656–1660. The printing of the Old Testament was started but stopped in May–August 1662 due to financial difficulties and doubts on the quality of the translation.

The full New Testament was published in 1701 by Samuelis Bitneris and in 1727 by Pilypas Ruigys. The full Bible in Lithuanian was first published in 1735 in Königsberg. This translation was sponsored by Johann Jakob Quandt and was prepared by joint Lutheran and Calvinist efforts. This translation was edited by Ludwig Rhesa (published in 1816), Friedrich Kurschat (published in 1853), and Adomas Einoras (published in 1897).

Algirdas Jurėnas published the New Testament and Psalms in 1961 in London and the full Bible in 2000 in Duncanville, Texas. Alfredas Vėlius published the Bible and the Biblical apocrypha in 1988. Methodist Kostas Burbulys translated the Bible which was published in 1999 in Lithuania.

== Roman Catholic Bibles ==
The Roman Catholic Church showed no particular interest in publishing the Bible in the Lithuanian language. Some excerpts were published by Mikalojus Daukša (1599), Konstantinas Sirvydas (1629, 1644), and others. A collection of excerpts from the Bible was published by Jonas Jaknavičius in 1647. This work received some 30 revised and expanded editions.

The New Testament in the Samogitian dialect was not published until 1814. This translation was prepared by Juozapas Arnulfas Giedraitis, Bishop of Samogitia, but did not include the customary explanations.

The full bible, translated by Archbishop Juozapas Skvireckas from the Vulgate, was published in six volumes in 1911–1937 by the Society of Saint Casimir and Saliamonas Banaitis in Kaunas. An edited Old Testament was published in Rome in 1955–1956.

In 1972, priest Česlovas Kavaliauskas prepared and published a new translation of the New Testament (revised edition in 1988). In 1973, priest Antanas Liesis published Psalms translated from the Nova Vulgata. Ladas Tulaba published a new translation of the New Testament in 1979 in Rome. In 1990–1995, a new translation of the full Old Testament was prepared by Antanas Rubšys who was awarded the Lithuanian National Prize for Culture and Arts for the efforts. The joint book of the Old Testament by Rubšys and the New Testament by Kavaliauskas was published in 1998 and is the standard Bible edition in Lithuania.

The Lithuanian Bible Society prepared and published new translations of the Gospel of Mark and Gospel of Matthew in 2016–2017, and Paul's letters in 2021 with a goal to publish the full New Testament in the coming years.
