= János Lackfi =

Hungarian poet, writer

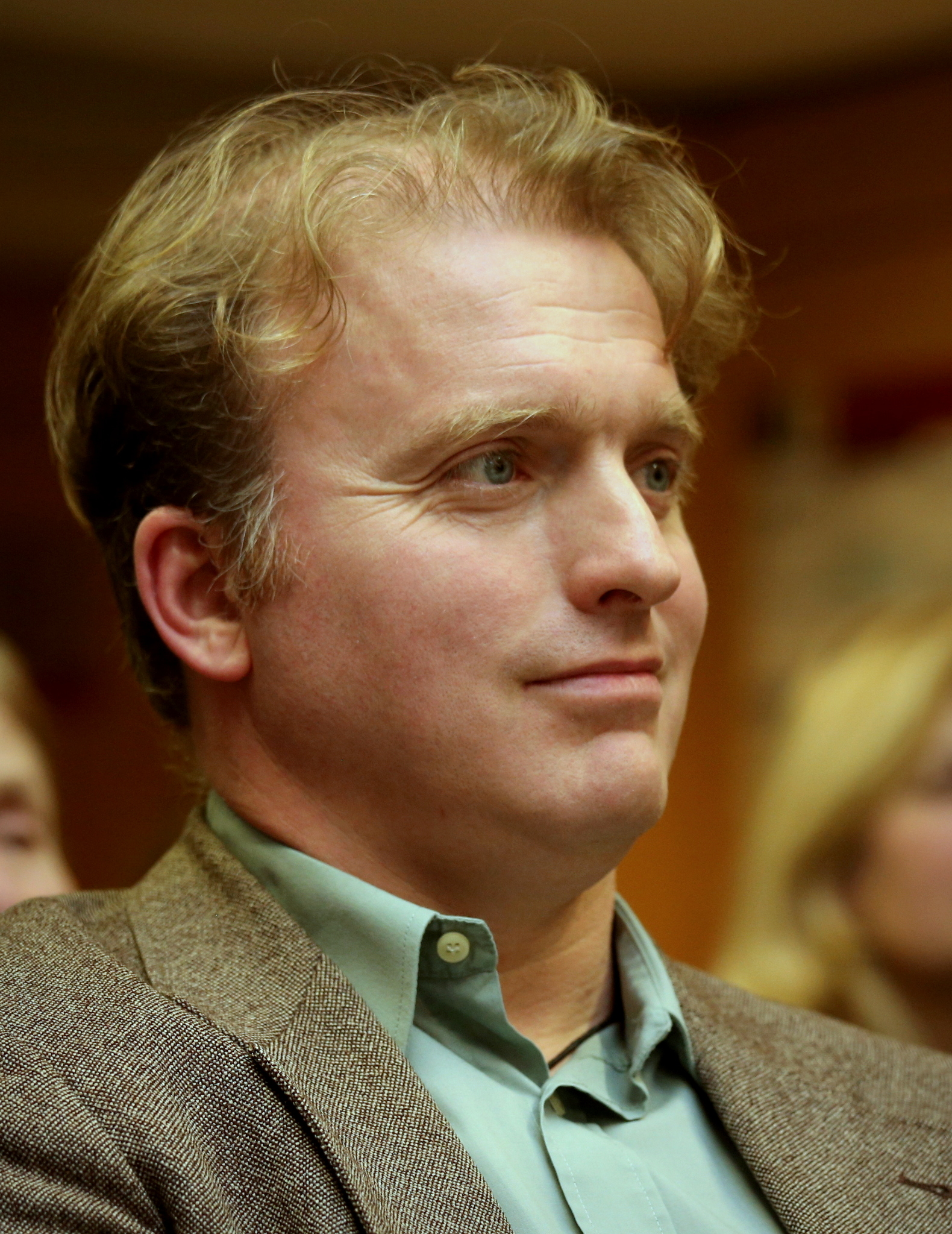
- in 2015
- Born: János Oláh; 18 May 1971 (age 55); Budapest
- Writing career
- Genres: poetry, prose
- Notable works: Magam ('Myself'), 1992
- Notable awards: Attila Gérecz Prize Attila József Prize Tibor Déry Prize
- Website: lackfi-janos.hu

János Lackfi (born János Oláh; 18 May 1971 in Budapest) is an Attila József Prize recipient Hungarian poet, writer, literary translator, teacher, Nyugat-expert, photographer.

== Life ==
Lackfi was born into a family where both his parents, Katalin Mezey and János Oláh were poets themselves. He attended Mihály Táncsics Secondary School from 1985 until 1989. During this period, his first writing was published in 1987 in a literary journal. After secondary school, he went on to study at Eötvös Lórand University where he received his diploma in Hungarian and French Literature. In 1994, he started teaching Belgian Literature at the university. He became a prominent young member of the Hungarian Writer's Union in 1996, and in the same year started his doctoral studies at Eötvös Lóránd University. After finishing his doctoral studies, he became the editor of Nagyvilág, which is a literary journal about world literature. In 1997, he started teaching on the French faculty of Péter Pázmány Catholic University and became the secretary of the Hungarian PEN Club. 2000 marked the point in his career when he became one of the founding editors of the Hungarian Internet journal Dokk.hu, which was an effort to support young writers and poets. The same year he received the Attila József Prize. Lackfi also authored the play Medveles (Bearspotting), which premiered in Hungary in 2024.

== Style ==
Lackfi is most known for his humour in his writings. He is able to approach serious topics such as death, alcoholism, suicide, love and faith in a manner that makes it easy for the reader to digest his lines. He uses puns, slang expressions, baby talk and jokes about parents to appeal to the younger audiences, and writes in warm and light-hearted tone about serious aspects of life to reach older readers. He is one of the favourite contemporary writers of Hungary because of his unique style, and how approachable it makes him as an artist and a man.

== Works ==
=== Poetry collections ===
- Magam (1992, "Myself")
- Illesztékek (1995, "Seams")
- Hosszú Öltésekkel (1998, "With Long Stitches")
- Elképzelhető (1999, "Imaginable")
- Öt Seb (2000, "Five Wounds")
- Hófogók (2001, "Snow-shields")
- Hőveszteség (2005, "Heat Loss")
- Élőhal (2011, "Live fish")

=== Prose collections ===
- Két csavart szaltó (1999, "Two twist somersaults")
- Halottnéző (2005, "Mortuary")
- A legnehezebb kabát (2011, "The Heaviest Coat")
- Csak úszóknak (2012, "Swimmers Only!")
- Milyenek a magyarok? (2012, "What are Hungarians like?")
- Milyenek még a magyarok? (2013, "What else are Hungarians like?")

=== Poems translated into English ===
- Points of Contact (Érintkezési pontok)
- After all, one has to eat (Enni azért kell)
- Granny in the Pictures (Nagyi a képeken)
- Browsing (Böngészés)
- Instructive Aim (Nevelési célzat)
- The Frame (A keret)
- Journey to the Moon in five minutes (Öt perc alatt a Holdra)
- Around us the Summer (Körül a nyár)
- They Bought Apples (Alma)
- The Question (A kérdés)
- The Other Side (Túloldal)
- The Guest (A vendég)
- Somebody (Valaki)
- Revelation (Megvilágosodás)
- Drama (Színjáték)
- In the Valley (Völgyben)

== Translations ==
- Jean Echenoz : A greenwichi hosszúsági kör (novel, 1996, Ferenczy)
- Paul Nougé: A költő arcképe (poems, 1996, JPTE-Belgiumi Francia Közösség)
- Guy Goffette: Vízhalász (poems, with Krisztina Tóth and András Imreh, 1997, Széphalom)
- A lélek tájképei – Hat belga szimbolista költő (essays, 1997, Széphalom)
- André Breton : Nadja (novel, 1997, Maecenas)
- Gérard Bayo: Válogatott versek (poems, with György Tímár, 1997, Orpheusz)
- Max Jacob : Örök újdonságok (poems; coll., trans., essay, 1998, PKE)
- Yves Namur: A hét kapu könyve (poems, with György Tímá, 1998, Széphalom)
- Liliane Wouters: A vér zarándoklata (poems, with Krisztina Tóth and László Ferenczi, 1999, Széphalom)
- Maurice Maeterlinck : Pelléas és Mélisande (selection of dramas, With Miklós Bárdos, epilogue, 1999, Széphalom)
- Lorand Gaspar : Az anyag negyedik halmazállapota (selection, translation with others, 1999, Múlt és Jövő)
- Jean-Pierre Lemaire: Körülmetélt szív (poems, coll., trans., essay, 1999, PKE)
- Pierre Reverdy : Üvegtócsák (selection, epilogue, translation with others, 1999, Orpheusz)
- Maurice Maeterlinck : A kék madár (2006)
- Szerelem a síneken, Kortárs francia-belga elbeszélők (collection of short stories, epilogue, translation with others, Nagyvilág, 2002)
- Christian Gailly: Be-bop (Mágus, 2003)
- A hatlapú rigó. Kortárs francia-belga költők (coll., epilogue, translation with others, Nagyvilág, 2004)
- Benno Barnard: A hajótörött (coll., epilogue, translation with Krisztina Tóth and Judit Gera, Széphalom, 2004)
- Yvon Givert: Gyümölcsök pálinkában (Széphalom, 2006)
