= Rhopalic verse =

Type of verse

A rhopalic verse is a form of restricted poetry in the antiquity. It was noticed that in one hexameter verse, Homer used a sequence of words that consisted of 1, 2, 3, 4, and 5 syllables. After that some poets tried to write whole poems in this style. The term derives from the Greek word ῥόπᾰλον rhópalon "a club", which gets progressively wider from the handle to the head. The most famous verse of this kind is Oratio by Ausonius, of which these are the first three lines:

Latin text	English translation
Spēs, deus, aeternae statiōnis conciliātor, sī castīs precibus veniālēs invigilāmus, hīs, pater, ōrātis plācābilis adstipulāre.	O God, Hope of Eternal Life, Conciliator, if, with chaste entreaties, hoping for pardon, we keep vigil, look kindly on us and grant these prayers.

In Russia, an attempt was made by Valery Bryusov, in a 1918 poem, "A Gnome about the Life":

Russian text	Transliteration	English translation
Жизнь — игра желаний мимолетных, Есть — пора мечтаний безотчетных, Есть, потом, — свершений горделивых, Скук, истом, томлений прозорливых;...	Zhizn — igra zhelaniy mimolyotnykh, Yest — pora mechtaniy bezotchotnych, Yest, potom, — sversheniy gordelivekh, Skuk, istom, tomleniy prozorlivykh;...	Life is a game of fleeting desires, There is - a time of unaccountable dreams, There is, then, - of proud accomplishments, Boredoms, languors, visionary yearnings;...

A similar exercise was invented by the French Oulipo group, called "boule de neige", 'snowball': a poem in which the first line consists of a single-letter word, the second line is a two-letter word, etc. Variations included adding syllables instead of letters, and some others.
