= Germanism (linguistics) =

Characteristic feature of German occurring in another language

A Germanism is a loan word or other loan element borrowed from German into some other language.

== By language ==
=== Croatian ===
In the Austro-Hungarian monarchy, typical Austrian German words such as paradajz (Paradeiser meaning from paradise, for tomato, the verbatim translation rajčica is increasingly used), špajza (Speise, "food", used in the sense of "pantry"), knedli (Knödel, "dumplings"), putar (Butter, "butter", natively maslac), ribizli (Ribisel, "currants"), šnicla (Schnitzel, "flat piece of meat", natively odrezak), Fijaker (Fiaker, "fiacre"), foranga (Vorhang, "curtain", natively zavjesa), herceg (Herzog, "Duke", natively vojvoda), majstor (Meister, "master", often in the sense of "repairman") or tišljar (Tischler, "carpenter", natively stolar).

=== Czech ===
German words were imported so frequently that already Jan Hus (1412) vehemently opposed them. There were words like hantuch from German Handtuch for towel, šorc from Schürze for apron, knedlík from Knödel, hausknecht, German Hausknecht, for servant and forman from Fuhrmann for waggoner. But Hus did not succeed. Knedlíky are still served, and in 1631, the school reformer Jan Amos Komenský did not object to translate the biblical term paradise with lusthaus (German Lusthaus "house of joy").

In the late 19th century, many Czech craftsmen worked in the German-speaking area of the Danube monarchy. Czech adopted many loan words from this category: ermloch from German Ärmelloch for arm hole, flikovat from German flicken for darning and piglovat from bügeln for ironing.

=== English ===
One notable German word in the English language is "kindergarten", meaning "garden for the children". The first kindergarten outside the German area was founded in 1851 in London. Five years later, Margarethe Schurz opened the first kindergarten in America in Watertown, Wisconsin. The language in the first kindergarten was German, as they were thought to be for the children of German immigrants. In 1882, the number of kindergartens in the US was 348. Meanwhile, the majority of Americans are no longer aware of the German origin of the word. The kindergarten teacher was first called "kindergartner", and later "kindergarten teacher". "Kindergartner" is now the child who attends the kindergarten. The verb "to kindergarten" means using the kindergarten method. Often, however, only the first letter 'K' of the word "kindergarten" is used, so a "pre-K" is a child who is not old enough for kindergarten.

In English, the German "über" (hyper, over) is sometimes (often spelled "uber") used in compositions, as in ubergeek, to express extreme progression. In German the prefix "super" is sometimes used, next to "über", in the sense of superior, as in Superminister. The peculiar feature of the German language to build compound nouns contributes to proliferation of Germanisms and interesting neologisms. American students often use the term "foosball" (German Fußball) for the tabletop soccer, for which in Germany however the English term "kicker" is used.

=== Hebrew ===
Modern Hebrew includes several Germanisms, some coming directly from German, and some via the Yiddish language. In the artisanal sector, some German phrases such as stecker (German Stecker for plug) and dübel (German Dübel for dowel), the latter pronounced [diːbl] due to the missing "ü" umlaut.

=== Hungarian ===
The German vocabulary had already influenced the Hungarian language at the time of the marriage of the state's founder Stephen I of Hungary to princess Giselle of Bavaria in the year 996. An early example is the word Herzog ("Duke"). The Hungarian word herceg formed as a result of vowel harmony, the alignment of vowels in a word. This Hungarian word was later borrowed into South Slavic languages and gave rise to the geographical name Hercegovina.

German clergy, farmers and craftsmen were linguistically influential, particularly in the 13th and 18th centuries, bringing their own terminology to Hungary. These include the job titles bakter (Wächter, night watchman, train guard), suszter (Schuster, cobbler) and sintér (Schinder, a knacker) as well as the terms kuncsaft (Kundschaft, customer) and mester (Meister, master). In some professions, a large part of technical terms came via German, e.g. in the field of carpentry lazur (Lasur, glaze), firnisz (Firnis, lacquer), lakk (Lack, varnish), smirgli (Schmirgelpapier, sandpaper) and colstok (Zollstock, foot rule).

Words were also loaned in the time of the monarchs from the House of Habsburg. This explains a number of German words that are mainly used in Austria. These include the words krampusz (Krampus, companion of Santa Claus), partvis (Bartwisch, hand brooms), nokedli (Nocken, dumpling), and ribizli (Ribisel, currant). Eszcájg derives from Esszeug. Second-hand goods dealers were called handlé (Händler, merchant). Further examples include fasírt (Austrian German faschiert, minced meat) and knődli (Knödel, hot dumplings).

Even a German sentence became a Hungarian word. Vigéc, derived from the German greeting Wie geht's? (How are you?) is the Hungarian word for a door-to-door salesman.

=== Japanese ===
Japanese includes some words with German origin, such as アルバイト (arubaito) from the German Arbeit ("work", "job"); however, in Japan it is used to denote a minor job, e.g., a student's sideline.

Other words transferred into Japanese are related to climbing, like ヒュッテ (hyutte) from German Hütte for mountain hut, ゲレンデ (gerende) from German "Gelände" for terrain, アイゼン (aizen) from German Eisen (short for Steigeisen) for crampons, エーデルワイス (ēderuwaisu) for the edelweiss flower, リュックサック (ryukkusakku) from German Rucksack for backpack and probably also シュラフ (shurafu) from German Schlafsack for sleeping bag. Also, the main Japanese mountain chain is called Japanese Alps.

Since the medical education initially was influenced by its German teachers, many German medical terms became part of the Japanese language. These include クランケ (kuranke) from German Kranke as a term for the sick ones, カルテ (karute) from German Karte (card) in the sense of a card to record the course of disease of a patient, ギプス (gipusu) from German Gips for an orthopedic cast, アレルギー (arerugī) from German Allergie for allergy, and ノイローゼ (noirōze) from German Neurose for neurosis. Even the word オルガスムス (orugasumusu) for orgasm originates from the German word Orgasmus.

Of the typical German food items, the most commonly found in Japan are ザワークラウト (sawākurauto, Sauerkraut) and the cake specialties シュトレン (shutoren, Stollen) and バウムクーヘン (baumukūhen, Baumkuchen).

=== Polish ===
The German language greatly influenced Polish and other West Slavic languages, especially due to German settlement, shared borders and the implied policy of Germanisation after the Partitions of Poland. The majority of all the borrowed words in Polish are of German or Germanic origin. For example, kajuta from German Kajüte for (ship) cabin, sztorm from German Sturm for storm, burmistrz from German Bürgermeister for mayor, szynka from German Schinken for ham, or handel from German Handel for trade. Because most cities in Poland were founded on German Magdeburg Law in the Middle Ages many construction-related terms were borrowed, for instance, rynek (Ring - square or place or market); plac - Platz - square; cegła - Ziegel - brick; budynek - Büding - building (medieval High German) - with scores of derivatives on building materials, etc. Gmach (building) - from Gemach - a room.

In Polish Upper Silesia most of inhabitants speak standard Polish language but there is minority, who speak the Silesian dialect/language, they also use German words in every day life as either slang or as directly borrowed terms. In Upper Silesia and Katowice it is customary to use blumy instead of kwiat for a flower (German: Blume), if someone speaks Silesian.

=== Russian ===
After Tsar Peter the Great returned from Western Europe in the year 1698, the loan words were no longer taken from Greek and Polish. With Peter, transfers from Polish were replaced by transfers from Western languages. For the drastic reforms in the military and administration, economic and administrative experts were recruited from Germany. 1716 Peter ordered that the administrative writers learn German:

"Some 30 young officials should be sent to Königsberg for the purpose of learning the German language so that they are more suitable for the college."

In some sectors of handicraft, the Germans were the majority; towards the end of the 18th Century, thirty German but only three Russian watchmakers worked in St. Petersburg.

Mikhail Lomonosov, who studied in Marburg and Freiberg, is regarded as founder of the Russian mining science, mineralogy and geology. In his writings about mining and metallurgy, he uses German words, the names of metals and minerals Wismut Висмут (bismuth), Wolfram Вольфрам (tungsten), Gneis Гнейс (gneiss), Kwarz (in German spelled Quarz) Кварц (quartz), Potasch (in German Pottasche) Поташ (potash), Zink Цинк (zinc), Schpaty (German Spat) шпаты (feldspar), and the expression schteiger (German Steiger) (foreman of miners). Also the terms geolog (German Geologe) (geologist), gletscher (glacier) metallurgia (German Metallurgie) (metallurgy), nikel (in German Nickel), schichta (German Schicht (layer), used both for ore layer and layer in a blast furnace), and schlif (German Schliff) (the grinding or cutting of a stone) fall into this category.

=== Slovene ===
Slovene Germanisms are primarily evident in the syntax, lexicon, semantics, and phraseology of the language. There are few Germanisms in Slovene phonology and morphology. Many Slovene lexical Germanisms come from Austrian German.

== Derivations of German words ==
Germanisms in foreign languages may have gone through a change of meaning, appearing as a false friend to the learner's eye. For instance, in Russian галстук galstuk is not a scarf (German literally: "Halstuch"), but a tie, even though the modern German equivalent "Krawatte" (Croatian neck tie) seems to be of a more recent date; nor would a парикмахер parikmacher (German literally: "Perückenmacher") be a "wig-maker", but actually is a hairdresser.

Likewise, in Japanese, a messer is not a knife, but a scalpel. Two more examples would be Japanese アルバイト (transliterated to "arubaito", derived from German: Arbeit ["work"] and abbreviated to "baito") and リュックサック (transliterated to "ryukkusakku"; derived from German "Rucksack"; abbreviated to リュック ["ryukku"]).

== Literature ==
- Karl-Heinz Best: "Deutsche Entlehnungen im Englischen". In: Glottometrics. H. 13, 2006, S. 66–72.
- I. Dhauteville: Le français alsacien. Fautes de prononciation et germanismes. Derivaux, Strasbourg 1852.
- Jutta Limbach: Ausgewanderte Wörter. Hueber, Ismaning 2007, ISBN 978-3-19-107891-1. (Beiträge zur internationalen Ausschreibung "Ausgewanderte Wörter")
- Andrea Stiberc: Sauerkraut, Weltschmerz, Kindergarten und Co. Deutsche Wörter in der Welt. Herder, Freiburg 1999, ISBN 978-3-451-04701-5.
