= Kristijonas Donelaitis =

Prussian Lithuanian poet and Lutheran pastor (1714–1780)

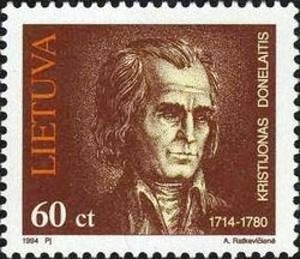
Donelaitis on a 1994 Lithuanian stamp

Kristijonas Donelaitis (Latin: Christian Donalitius; 1 January 1714 – 18 February 1780) was a Prussian Lithuanian poet and Lutheran pastor. He lived and worked in Lithuania Minor, a territory in the Kingdom of Prussia, that had a sizable Lithuanian-speaking minority. He wrote the first classic Lithuanian language poem, The Seasons (Lithuanian: Metai), which became one of the principal works of Lithuanian poetry. The poem, a classic work of Lithuanian literature, depicts everyday life of Lithuanian peasants, their struggle with serfdom, and the annual cycle of life.

== Biography ==
=== Early life ===
Donelaitis was born at Lasdinehlen estate (now Gusevsky District) near Gumbinnen, Prussia. His parents were free peasants who owned the land that they cultivated. His father died in 1720, leaving seven children (four sons and three daughters). One of his three brothers, Friedrich, became a goldsmith in Königsberg. Another brother, Michael, inherited the father's farm. His third brother, Adam, became a blacksmith and innkeeper.

In 1731, Donelaitis began attending the cathedral school in Kneiphof, a section of Königsberg. He lived in a pauper's dormitory and often went hungry for days. After graduation, he received a scholarship in 1736 to study at the University of Königsberg. For four years he studied Lutheran theology. His world view was shaped by the classical curriculum, required Lithuanian studies, and the Pietism movement. He learned Greek, Latin, French, and Hebrew languages, and studied the writings of classical authors such as Homer, Hesiod, Horace, and Virgil. After graduation, he was appointed as a cantor in Stallupönen. After the school rector died, Donelaitis took over his position. In 1743, he passed the required examination to become a pastor in Tollmingkehmen.

=== Life in Tollmingkehmen ===
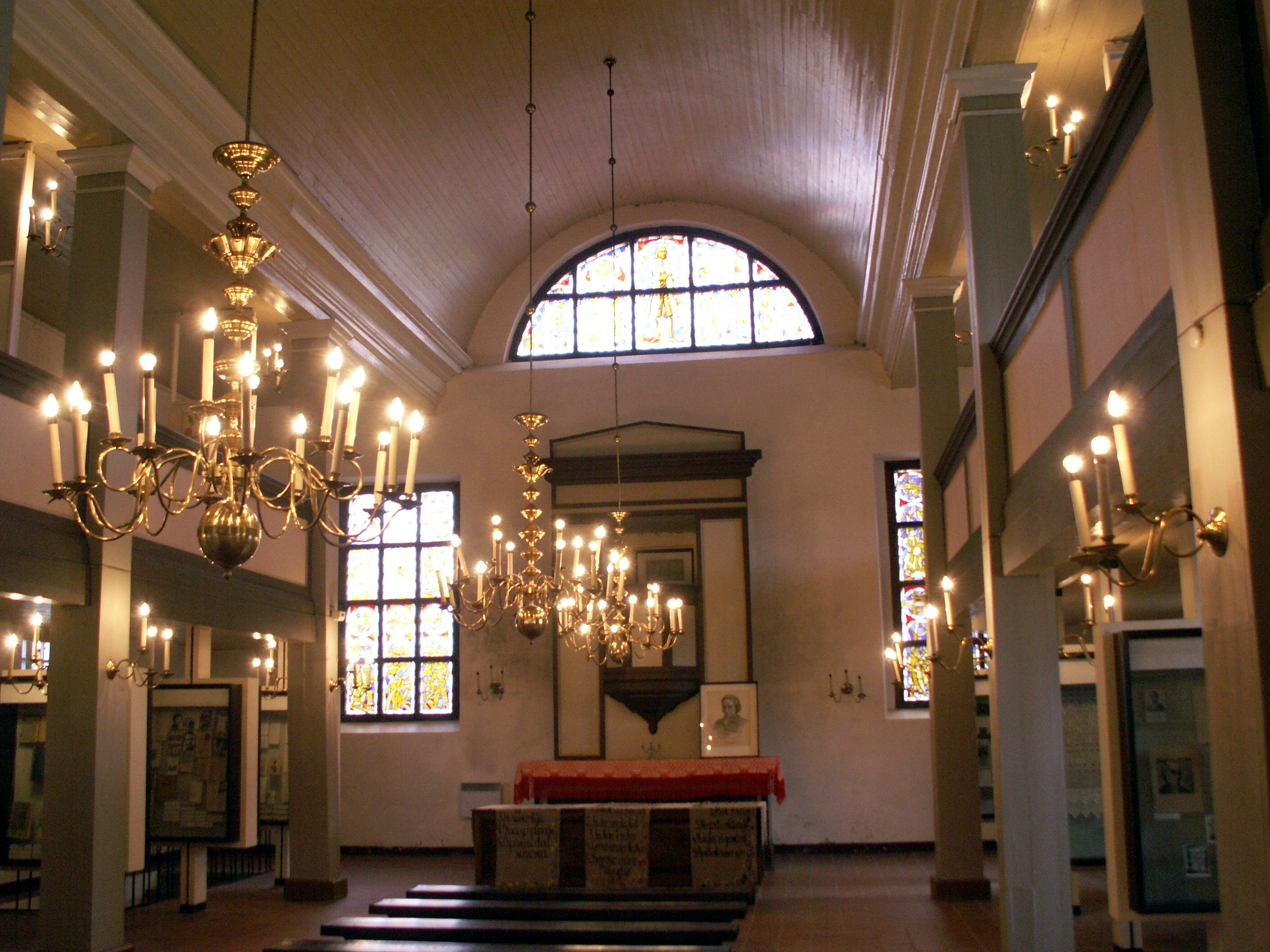
Inside the former Lutheran church of Tollmingkehmen, built by Donelaitis. In 1964, it was transformed into a memorial museum of Donelaitis.

Donelaitis lived in Tollmingkehmen from 1743 until his death in 1780. At the time, the parish of Tollmingkehmen had around 30 villages with around 3,000 residents. The population was about two-thirds German and one-third Lithuanian. In 1744, Donelaitis married Anna Regina Ohlefant, widow of the school rector in Stallupönen. In 1747, he worked to restore the rectory, and built a new brick church in 1756. In 1757, during the Seven Years' War, Donelaitis and his parishioners retreated to the Romincka Forest to hide from the advancing Imperial Russian Army. When he returned to the town, Donelaitis refused to preach praises to the Russian Tsar. After the war he rebuilt a burned school and sponsored construction of a shelter for widows. His hobbies included building thermometers and barometers, and constructing pianos and clavichords. He died, aged 66, in Tollmingkehmen, East Prussia.

== Works ==
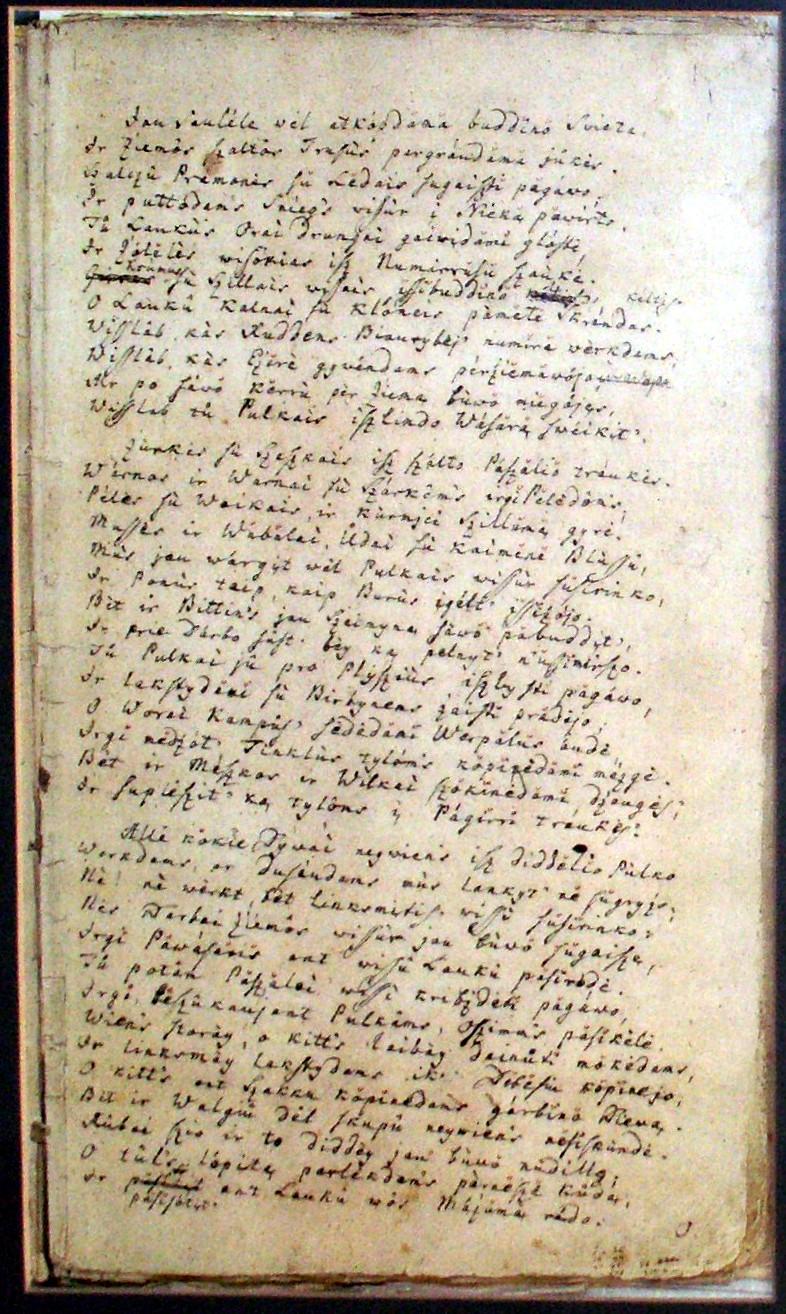
The original first page of Spring Joys, which is considered the beginning of The Seasons

None of Donelaitis's works were published during his lifetime. Donelaitis wrote at least three poems in the German language (An der Amstrath Donalitius nach dem Verlust seiner Gattin, Der Gott der Finsterniss, and Unschuld sei mein ganzes Leben). His Lithuanian works consist of six fables and the poem The Seasons. Donelaitis's publisher, Ludwig Rhesa, believed that the fables, based on Aesop's Fables, were written for his students in Stallupönen. Their language and poetic rhythm are not as well-developed as in his later works.

His major work, The Seasons, was titled by Rheza. It consisted of four idylls, totaling 2,997 hexameters. The work was a long-term project, often revised and rewritten, without a clear beginning or ending. Only two original idylls survive. The other two were destroyed during the Napoleonic Wars. The full work is known from a copy made by Pastor Hohlfeldt after 1794. Between 1809 and 1818, Rheza collected Donelaitis's works, edited and translated them, and finally published it as Das jahr in vier Gesängen. It was a heavily edited and censored edition, containing only about one sixth of the original poem. In 1824, Rheza also published the fables. A fuller publication of The Seasons was prepared by August Schleicher in 1865, but this edition was criticized by Georg H. F. Nesselmann, who prepared an edition in 1869.

== Legacy ==
Donelaitis and his works are considered to be an important part of Lithuanian culture, which also led to creation of literature and music works based on Donelaitis's life and his poem The Seasons. At the Lithuanian National Opera and Ballet Theatre in 1985, an opera Kristijonas by Algimantas Bražinskas was performed. In 2012, an oratorio Seasons by Bronius Kutavičius was performed.
