= Metron (poetry) =

Repeating 3 to 6-syllable section of a poetic metre

A metron /ˈmɛtrɒn/, /ˈmɛtrən/ (from ancient Greek μέτρον "measure"), plural metra, is a repeating section, 3 to 6 syllables long, of a poetic metre.

The word is particularly used in reference to ancient Greek. According to a definition by Paul Maas, usually a metron consists of two long elements and up to two other elements which can be short, anceps or biceps. Thus an iambic metron is x – ᴗ – (where "x" represents an anceps element), a trochaic metron is – ᴗ – x, an ionic metron is ᴗ ᴗ – –, an anapaestic metron is ᴗᴗ – ᴗᴗ –, a cretic metron – ᴗ –, a baccheus is ᴗ – –, and a spondee is – –.

This definition of the metron as having two long elements does not apply to the dactylic hexameter or to the dochmiac metre, however. Some scholars regard the dactyl (– ᴗᴗ) and the dochmiac (ᴗ – – ᴗ –) as metra in their own right. Some of the more complex lyric metres, such as the dactylo-epitrite used in some of Pindar's odes, are not usually analysed in terms of metra.

Some metra, such as the iambic x – ᴗ – or the trochaic – ᴗ – x, can be analysed as consisting of two "feet". In this case the metron is also sometimes known as a "dipody" /ˈdɪpədɪ/, from ancient Greek διποδία.

== "Metron" in ancient Greek ==
In ancient Greek, the word μέτρον had a variety of meanings. The basic meaning is the "measure, size, length" of something. Another meaning is "metre" or "verse", for example λὀγους εἰς μέτρα τιθέντες (logous eis métra tithéntes) "putting words into verse" (Plato); a μετρικός is an expert in metre. τὸ ἰαμβεῖον μέτρον (tò iambeîon métron) in Aristotle means "the iambic metre". But Aristotle also defines μέτρα as μόρια τῶν ῤυθμῶν (mória tôn ruthmôn) "parts of the rhythms".

The words δίμετρον dímetron "dimeter", τρίμετρον trímetron "trimeter" and τετράμετρον tetrámetron "tetrameter" are found in ancient Greek. This implies that the ancient Greek poets were aware that their verses could be divided into two, three, or four equal sections, even though the word the word μέτρον itself had no precise definition.

Ancient prosodists such as Hephaestion usually referred to metra using individual names for the different shapes: thus Hephaestion refers to the shape ᴗ ᴗ – ᴗ as the "third paeonic" and – ᴗ – – as the "second epitrite" and so on.

== Metron and foot ==
The equivalent of metra can also be found in the poetry of other languages, such as Arabic, Persian, and Sanskrit. However, in descriptions of the metres of these languages, what in Greek metrics is called a "metron" (i.e. a repeating section of 3 to 6 syllables) is often called a "foot" by modern scholars.

Thus in the traditional description of Arabic metre by William Wright, a section such as – – ᴗ – is referred to as a "foot". However, Golston and Riad refer to it as a "metron": "A crucial element of our analysis is that what is traditionally considered a verse foot is in fact a metron (two verse feet)."

Similarly Bruce Hayes and Finn Thiesen refer to a four-syllable repeating section of a Persian metre as a "foot". Despite using the term "foot", both Wright and Hayes refer to lines with two, three or four feet respectively as dimeters, trimeters and tetrameters.

== Trimeters and tetrameters ==
A line of poetry most commonly consists of from two to four metra, rarely of a single metron. The terms "monometer", "dimeter", "trimeter", and "tetrameter" are used for metres that consist of one, two, three, or four metra respectively.

Thus an ancient Greek iambic trimeter has the following pattern:

x – ᴗ – | x – ᴗ – | x – ᴗ –

A dactylic hexameter, however, has six feet, not six metra, since according to Paul Maas's definition a dactylic metron (as used in lyric poetry) is – ᴗᴗ – ᴗᴗ.

Normally in Greek and Latin, in those metres where a metron is defined as having two long elements, there are no more than four metra in any line of poetry. There are rare exceptions such as Callimachus fragment 399 (trochaic pentameter catalectic) and fragment 229 (a choriambic pentameter).

The same rule also applies in Arabic and Persian. Thus in Wright's list of Arabic metres, there are dimeters, trimeters, and tetrameters only, and similarly in Persian, no metre is longer than a tetrameter of 16 syllables, or shorter than 10 syllables.

In some kinds of Greek and Latin lyric poetry, however, the same type of metra may run on without stopping for a number of lines with no pause at the end of each line. Such passages are known as "systems" and can be found in trochaic, ionic, and anapaestic metres.

== Catalexis ==
In some cases the last element of a metre is omitted. In this case the metre is called "catalectic". For example, the following metre is known as a trochaic tetrameter catalectic (in Latin it is known as a trochaic septenarius):

– ᴗ – x | – ᴗ – x | – ᴗ – x | – ᴗ –

If an iambic metre ending in a long element is made catalectic, the final metron changes from x – ᴗ – to ᴗ – x (with brevis in longo at the end). For example, the iambic tetrameter catalectic is as follows:

x – ᴗ – | x – ᴗ – | x – ᴗ – | ᴗ – x

== Beating time ==
Although the iambic trimeter has six feet, the ancient metricians state that it had three "beats" (tres percussiones). Quintilian writes:

trimetrum et senarium promiscue dicere licet: sex enim pedes, tres percussiones habet.
"You can call it "trimeter" or senarius as you wish; for it has six feet, but three beats."

Similarly Terentianus Maurus states:

iambus ipse sex enim locis manet,
et inde nomen inditum est senario;
sed ter ferītur, hinc trimetrus dicitur.
scandendo binos quod pedes coniungimus,

"The iamb itself is found in six places,
and from that the name senarius is given.
But a beat is made three times, hence it is known as a "trimeter",
because when scanning we join the feet in pairs."

Terentianus also speaks of the teacher tapping his foot or clicking his thumb once every second iamb to help the pupil keep in time.

Another writer, a certain cavalry officer called Paccius Maximus (1st century AD), writes of keeping time when writing poetry by beating with a stick:

ῥάβδῳ δέ τις οἷα κατὰ μέλος δέμας δονηθείς
rhábdōi dé tis hoîa katà mélos démas donētheís
"like one who is tapped on his body with a stick in time with a melody"

It would therefore seem that the metra, being of equal length, created a rhythm that made it possible to beat time once each metron. The question remains on which of the two long elements the downbeat came. Wallace Lindsay writes:

Iambic, like Trochaic and Anapaestic Metre, was scanned by Dipodies, not by single feet. The chief metrical ictus of the line, in other words the syllables at which the baton of a conductor keeping time would fall, were in an Iambic Trimeter the 2nd, 4th, and 6th Arses (in a Trochaic Tetrameter the 1st, 3rd, 5th, and 7th). Hence the necessity of exhibiting the metre in its pure form at these parts of the line (Bassus ap. Rufin. 555K; Terent. 2246 sqq. K).

Despite this statement, Lindsay himself, when he wishes to show the ictus in a trimeter, always marks not the 2nd, 4th, and 6th but the 1st, 3rd, and 5th Arses with an accent, for example:

sequere hác me, gnata, ut múnus fungarís tuom
("follow me this way, daughter, so that you can perform your duty")

It is less usual for editors these days to mark the ictus, except sporadically. It is generally agreed by modern scholars that the word accents in Latin did not change to agree with the so-called "ictus" when poetry was recited, but that the length of the syllables alone determined the rhythm.

== Unequal metra ==
In the examples given above the same metron is repeated several times to make a metrical line. But in some metres different kinds of metron are mixed in the same line. In the anacreontic metre, according to the ancient grammarian Hephaestion, two different metra, one of five morae and one of seven, are joined into one line:

ᴗ ᴗ – ᴗ | – ᴗ – –

This phenomenon, where one metron "borrows" a time unit from the preceding metron, was referred to by ancient metrical writers such as Marius Victorinus as anaclasis ("bending back"). In recent metrical studies the term anaclasis has been extended to cover not just inversion across a metron boundary but any instance where the sequence x – corresponds to – x in a parallel part of the same metre.

== Placing the divisions ==
The Sotadean metre is particularly difficult to analyse. It is usually transcribed in the following form, consisting of alternating ionicus a maiore and di-trochaic metra:

– – ᴗ ᴗ | – – ᴗ ᴗ | – ᴗ – ᴗ | – x

In this regular form of the metre, as used by Petronius and Martial, the ionic rhythm is found in the first two metra, and the trochaic in the third, but in other authors the trochaic rhythm may be found also in the first or second metron, or all three metra may be ionic.

An alternative scansion, however, suggested by D. S. Raven, is to analyse the metre as ionic a minore (ᴗ ᴗ – –) rather than ionic a maiore (– – ᴗ ᴗ):

– – | ᴗ ᴗ – – | ᴗ ᴗ – ᴗ | – ᴗ – –

Similar problems of deciding where the metra begin and end are found in certain Persian metres such as the ruba'i (quatrain), with different scholars suggesting different solutions (see below).

== Aeolic verse ==
Aeolic metres are not usually analysed in terms of metra. D. S. Raven writes: "Unlike the metres described in previous chapters, aeolic does not run on any regular 'metron-scheme'."

However, according to a recent analysis by Paul Kiparsky, aeolic metres too can be analysed into metra. For example, the glyconic metre can be analysed as a dimeter:

x x – ᴗ | ᴗ – ᴗ –

Kiparsky compares this metre to the metres of the earliest Indian poetry, the Vedic hymns, where in the same way a line often consists of eight syllables, with a syncopated rhythm in the first part of the line, given way to regular iambic in the second half. In the same way, Kiparsky analyses the phalaecian hendecasyllable as a catalectic trimeter, as follows:

x x – ᴗ | ᴗ – ᴗ – | ᴗ – –
vivamus, mea Lesbia, atque amemus

== Sanskrit ==
Classical Sanskrit is said to have as many as 600 different metres, most of which are difficult to analyse into metra. The very earliest metres, however, used in hymns included in the Rigveda, were written in lines mostly of iambic character, which are often analysed as being divided into sections of four syllables each.

Thus the 8-syllable lines used in the anuṣṭubh (4 × 8 syllables) and gāyatrī (3 × 8) metres are usually represented as follows:

x – x – | ᴗ – ᴗ x

There can, however, be rhythmic inversions or substitutions, especially in the first half of the line, disturbing the mainly iambic rhythm.

In the later hymns in the Rigveda, the anuṣṭubh metre developed into the epic śloka, in which a trochaic cadence in the 2nd and 6th metron alternates with an iambic cadence in the 4th and 8th:

x x x x | ᴗ – – x || x x x x | ᴗ – ᴗ x (x2)

There is less consensus among scholars as to the division of the 11-syllable triṣṭubh and 12-syllable jagatī. Arnold (1905) mentions that some scholars divide the triṣṭubh into two parts at the caesura (which comes either after the 4th syllable or the 5th). He himself divides it into three "members", of 4 + 3 + 4 syllables. Other scholars such as H. N. Randle (1957) and Paul Kiparsky prefer to divide it into 4 + 4 + 3. Different styles of triṣṭubh were popular in different periods, but in most styles the second "member" tends not to be iambic. Common patterns are:

x – x – | –, ᴗ ᴗ – | ᴗ – x
x – x –, | ᴗ ᴗ – – | ᴗ – x

== Arabic ==
Arab metricians traditionally divide a line into sections using a series of mnemonic words based on the verb faʿala "do", known as tafāʿīl. In this system the tawīl metre is described as

faʿūlun mafāʿīlun faʿūlun mafāʿilun

Put into European notation this becomes:

ᴗ – x | ᴗ – – – | ᴗ – x | ᴗ – ᴗ – (2x)

The basīt metre is described by the Arab metricians as

mustafʿilun fāʿilun mustafʿilun faʿilun.

and by Europeans as follows:

x – ᴗ – | x ᴗ – | – – ᴗ – | ᴗ ᴗ – (2x)

Thus these two very common metres of classical Arabic, although they can be divided into four sections, and are described by Wright as "tetrameters", differ from Greek metres in that alternate sections have only one long element instead of two. One solution to this discrepancy is that of Paul Kiparsky and Ashwini Deo, who suggest that the shorter metra (or feet) of Arabic metres like the tawīl can be considered to be catalectic. They write:

"Catalexis, i.e. a missing position at the end of a foot, can likewise occur in Arabic in any foot, whereas Persian and Urdu only allow it at the end of a line, or at the end of a half line in those meters which require a caesura at the middle of a line."

Some Arabic metres are divided by Arab metricians into metra of the same kind as in Greek, containing two long elements in each metron. For example the kāmil:

ᴗᴗ – ᴗ – | ᴗᴗ – ᴗ – | ᴗᴗ – ᴗ –

The wāfir is a catalectic trimeter as follows:

ᴗ – ᴗᴗ – | ᴗ – ᴗᴗ – | ᴗ – – |

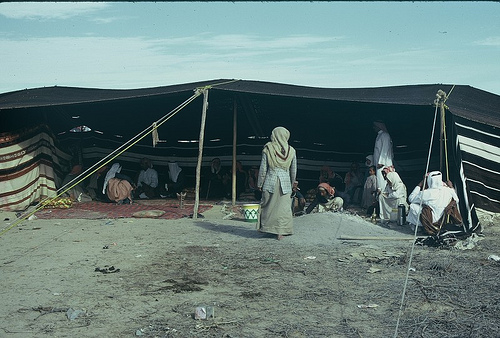
A Bedouin tent in Saudi Arabia in the 1970s

The 8th-century Arab metrician al-Khalīl used metaphorical language referring to a Beduin tent to describe a line of verse. A complete couplet of six or eight feet or metra is described as a bayt "tent", and the feet or metra themselves are called arkān (singular rukn) "support poles". In this system, each foot or metron is composed of a watad or watid (plural awtād) "tent-peg" and either one or two asbāb (singular sabab) "guy-ropes". The "pegs" are fixed points in the line, usually consisting of a short plus a long syllable (but sometimes the reverse), while the "ropes" can be variable. Thus in the tawīl metre the "pegs" are the ᴗ – sections at the beginning of each metron:

ᴗ – x | ᴗ – – – | ᴗ – x | ᴗ – ᴗ – (2x)

Whereas in the kāmil metre, the pegs are the ᴗ – at the end of each metron:

ᴗᴗ – ᴗ – | ᴗᴗ – ᴗ – | ᴗᴗ – ᴗ – (2x)

In the basīt the "pegs" likewise are the ᴗ – sections at the end of each metron:

x – ᴗ – | x ᴗ – | – – ᴗ – | ᴗ ᴗ – (2x)

In the khafīf metre, the second "peg" is a trochee (– ᴗ) instead of an iamb (ᴗ –), according to Khalil's system:

| x ᴗ – x | – – ᴗ – | x ᴗ – x | (2x)

The orientalist Gotthold Weil, who was the first to fully explain al-Khalil's system, argued that in early times when poetry was recited the "peg" was stressed. However, other scholars have doubted this, since in recitation, the word-accents often do not correspond to the "pegs". According to one recent assessment, "There is no conclusive evidence that stress is one of the factors shaping Arabic prosody."

== Persian ==
In Persian every metre in common use can be analysed as falling into regular sections of either 3 or 4 syllables which repeat periodically. For example, the metre of Ferdowsi's Shahnameh is traditionally analysed as a catalectic tetrameter:

ᴗ – – | ᴗ – – | ᴗ – – | ᴗ –

This metre, known as mutaqārib, and its 12 syllable acatalectic version, are the only metres in which the line is divided into three-syllable sections. In all the rest, the division is into sections of four syllables.

Thus Rumi's Masnavi is a catalectic trimeter:

– ᴗ – – | – ᴗ – – | – ᴗ –

The following, the metre of the Do-baytī, is equally a catalectic trimeter, but starting from the short syllable:

ᴗ – – – | ᴗ – – – | ᴗ – –

The following metre, known as mojtass, common in the Persian poet Hafez, is traditionally analysed as a catalectic tetrameter with anaclasis (i.e. alternation of – u and u –) in the 2nd and 3rd elements of the metron:

ᴗ – ᴗ – | ᴗ ᴗ – – | ᴗ – ᴗ – | ᴗ ᴗ –

In most cases, as above, scholars are in agreement where the metra begin and end. However, there are some metres, such as the metre of the ruba'i, where the division is less certain, and different authors have different views.

Finn Thiessen suggested that one possible criterion is to use internal rhyme to show the position where a metron ends, as in the following line:

na be dīdār o be dīnār o be sūd ō be ziān
ᴗ ᴗ – – | ᴗ ᴗ – – | ᴗ ᴗ – – | ᴗ ᴗ –

By this criterion, the following metre starts mid-metron:

khīzīd o khaz ārīd, ke hengām-e khazān ast
– – | ᴗ ᴗ – – | ᴗ ᴗ – – | ᴗ ᴗ – –

The Persian metricist Masood Farzaad suggested another criterion, namely that a metron often ends at a place where there is often a break in the syntax. Using this criterion Farzaad analysed the two versions of the 13-syllable ruba'i metre as follows:

– | – ᴗ ᴗ – || – ᴗ ᴗ – | – ᴗ ᴗ – or:
– | – ᴗ ᴗ – || ᴗ – ᴗ – | – ᴗ ᴗ –

However, other metricians have suggested different analyses. In view of the uncertainties in placing the metron boundaries in some of the metres, L.P. Elwell-Sutton does not mark foot divisions in his analysis of the Persian metres contained in his book The Persian Metres (1976).
