= Greek and Latin metre =

Poetry meters

Greek and Latin metre is an overall term used for the various rhythms in which Greek and Latin poems were composed. The individual rhythmical patterns used in Greek and Latin poetry are also known as "metres" (US "meters").

Greek poetry developed first, starting in the 8th century BC or earlier with the epic poems of Homer and the later didactic poems of Hesiod, which were composed in the dactylic hexameter. A variety of other metres were used for lyric poetry and for classical Greek drama.

Some of the earliest Latin poems, dating from the 3rd century BC, were composed in Saturnian verse, which is not used in Greek. Apart from these Saturnian poems, which today survive only in fragments, all Latin poetry is written in adaptations of various Greek metres. Although a large number of Greek metres were adapted, Latin verse tends to imitate only the simpler forms, and complex stanzas in irregular and rapidly changing metres such as the dactylo-epitrite used in many of Pindar's choral odes are not found in Latin.

== Prosody ==
Apart from Saturnian verse, whose basis is not well understood, and some types of medieval rhythmic verse, all classical Greek and Latin metre is quantitative, that is, based on different patterns of long and short syllables, rather than syllabic-accentual, that is, based on patterns of stressed and unstressed syllables.

Prosody, that is, the rules for deciding which syllables are short and which are long, is more or less the same in Greek and Latin. Syllables which end in a short vowel, like the first syllable of Greek πα-τήρ or Latin pa-ter 'father', are treated as short; syllables which contain a long vowel or diphthong, or which ended with a consonant, like the first syllable of Rō-ma 'Rome', sae-pe 'often', or stul-tus 'foolish', were treated as long.

If a single consonant comes between two vowels, it is usually taken with the second syllable, even at the end of a word: thus miser est 'he is wretched' is divided mi-se-rest (short, short, long). If two consonants came between two vowels, they are usually divided between the syllables, e.g. stul-tus 'foolish'. However, there are some ambiguous cases; for example, the first syllable of patrem 'father (accusative case)' can be treated as either long (pat-rem) or short (pa-trem) in Virgil.

An important feature of both Greek and Latin prosody is elision. If a word ending in a short vowel (or -m in Latin) is followed by a word beginning with a vowel (or h-), the final vowel is usually not regarded as a separate syllable. In Greek the vowel is replaced by an apostrophe. Thus the word δὲ 'and' is reduced to δ' in the phrase: πολλὰς δ' ἰφθίμους ψυχὰς (pollàs d' iphthímous psukhàs) 'and many mighty souls' (seven long syllables). In Latin the elided vowel continued to be written, but was presumably not pronounced or else pronounced very rapidly. Occasionally even a long vowel was elided, as in the following example, which also illustrates the ambiguity of patr-, since pa-tris has a short first syllable here and pat-rem a long one:

nāt(um) ant(e) ōra patris, patrem qu(ī) obtruncat ad ārās.
'who cuts down the son in front of his father, and the father at the altars'

The process of determining which syllables are long and which are short, and showing how the words of a poem match a metrical pattern, is known as scansion. The above line of Virgil is scanned as follows, where – represents a long syllable, and ᴗ a short one:

– – | – ᴗ ᴗ | – – | – – | – ᴗ ᴗ | – –

== Rhythmic types ==
The different individual metres can be classified according to their predominant rhythmic type. In the examples below, the symbol x represents a syllable that can be either long or short. For example:

- Iambic: x – ᴗ – ...
- Trochaic: - ᴗ – x ...
- Dactylic: – ᴗ ᴗ – ᴗ ᴗ ...
- Anapaestic: ᴗ ᴗ – ᴗ ᴗ – ...
- Choriambic: – ᴗ ᴗ – – ᴗ ᴗ – ...
- Ionic: ᴗ ᴗ – – ᴗ ᴗ – – ...
- Anacreontic: ᴗ ᴗ – ᴗ – ᴗ – – ...
- Bacchiac: ᴗ – – ᴗ – – ...
- Dochmiac: ᴗ – – ᴗ – ... or ᴗ ᴗ ᴗ – ᴗ – ... etc.
- Cretic: – ᴗ – – ᴗ – ...
- Spondaic: – – – – ...
- Aeolic: x x – ᴗ ᴗ – ᴗ – (and variations)

There are also metres which combine different rhythms, for example the dactylo-epitrite, which combines trochaic and dactylic elements.

== Major forms ==
The greater part of Ancient Greek poetry is composed of stichic (/ˈstɪkɪk/) metres, which are those in which the same verse-pattern is repeated line after line with no strophic structure. The six main stichic metres used in Greek, according to Martin Litchfield West, are the following. (Strictly speaking, the elegiac couplet is strophic, not stichic, but West considers its use in extended poems makes it suitable for inclusion here.)

- Dactylic hexameter, the meter of the Iliad, Odyssey and Aeneid, used for epic and other narrative and didactic poetry
- Elegiac couplet, consisting of a line of dactylic hexameter and one of dactylic pentameter, employed by Ovid for all his extant works except the Metamorphoses
- Iambic trimeter, the most common meter in the dialogue portions of tragedy and comedy (also known in Latin as Iambic senarius)
- Trochaic tetrameter (catalectic) (in Latin also known as Trochaic septenarius)
- Iambic tetrameter catalectic (in Latin also known as Iambic septenarius)
- Choliambic (also known as Scazon), a variation on the Iambic trimeter

These are not the only stichic metres used in Greek and Latin poetry. Among others are:

- Eupolidean
- Sotadean
- Anapaestic septenarius
- Galliambic
- Phalaecian hendecasyllable

== Lyric metres ==
=== Epodic metres ===
Epodic metres are a simple kind of strophic verse practised by some Ionian poets of the archaic period, namely Archilochus, Hipponax, and Anacreon. Mostly these consist of either a dactylic hexameter or an iambic trimeter, followed by an "epode", which is a shorter line either iambic or dactylic in character, or a mixture of these. The first or second line can also end with an ithyphallic colon (– ᴗ – ᴗ – x). For examples of such epodic strophes see:

- Archilochian
- Alcmanian

These metres were imitated in Latin in Horace's Epodes.

=== Aeolic verse ===
Aeolic verse begins with the short lyric poems of the Lesbian poets Sappho and Alcaeus. Nearly all the poems of Sappho and Alcaeus are composed in strophes (stanzas) of two, three, or four verses, in which at least one line would be different from the others. The most common rhythm is the glyconic (x x – ᴗ ᴗ – ᴗ x), but this could be expanded or varied in a number of ways.

- Glyconic
- Pherecratean
- Asclepiad
- Sapphic stanza, so called for Sappho
- Alcaic stanza, so called for Alcaeus
- Adonean or Adonic

The following is also a kind of aeolic verse, though used stichically:

- Phalaecian hendecasyllable

The simpler kinds of Aeolic verse were imitated in Latin by Horace in his Odes, while the Phalaecian hendecasyllable was used frequently by Catullus, Statius, and Martial.

=== Dorian lyric ===
The early Dorian lyric poets include Alcman, Stesichorus, and Ibycus. The choral odes of these poets tend not to be in any one metre, but consist of lines of irregular pattern containing dactylic, aeolic, and trochaic elements. Among the fragments of Alcman's poetry there are also some cretic and spondaic lines.

Later, in the choral odes of Simonides, Bacchylides, and Pindar, three main types of metre were used: dactylo-epitrite, aeolic, and iambic. The first of these is a mixture of dactylic elements (e.g. the hemiepes – ᴗ ᴗ – ᴗ ᴗ –) and so called "epitrite" elements (e.g. – ᴗ – x – ᴗ –) with linking syllables between them.

These poets wrote in the Doric dialect, with forms such as μᾶτερ 'mother' instead of the Attic μήτηρ, and this custom was continued in the choral songs in the tragedies written by Athenian poets such as Aeschylus, Sophocles and Euripides. The later Dorian poets wrote their odes in triadic structure (strophe, antistrophe, and epode), where the strophe and antistrophe were of identical metrical pattern, and the epode of a different pattern.

The complex rhythms of the Dorian poets are not found in Latin, but there are a few poems composed in the simple Alcmanian strophe, consisting of a dactylic hexameter followed by a dactylic tetrameter, as in Horace, Odes 1.7 and 1.28 and Epode 12.

=== Ionic metres ===
- Ionic
- Anacreontic
- Galliambic, a relatively rare form of which Carmen 63 by Catullus is the only complete example from antiquity
- Sotadean

Anacreon (late 6th century BC) was an Ionian rather than Dorian, and wrote all his poetry in the Ionian dialect. He wrote some songs in aeolic metres, or aeolic mixed with iambic elements. But he also wrote songs in ionic metre, often using the anaclastic form known as anacreontic, or a mixture of anacreontic and pure ionic elements.

The ionic metre is occasionally found in Greek tragedies in appropriate settings, for example in Aeschylus's The Persians and in Euripides' The Bacchae.

Ionic metres are rare in Latin. Horace Odes 3.12 is a rare example composed entirely in ionic feet, with ten feet to each stanza. Anacreontics are also very rare. The Galliambic metre of Catullus's poem 63 (but of which there are no extant examples in Greek) is a development of the anacreontic.

The Sotadean metre, named after the poet Sotades (3rd century BC) is another variation of ionic. It was also used occasionally in Latin, for example in two poems in Petronius.

=== Other lyric metres ===
- Anapaestic
- Dochmiac

== Bibliography ==
- Allen, W. S. (1978). Vox Latina: A Guide to the Pronunciation of Classical Latin (2nd edition). Cambridge.
- Maas, P. (translated H. Lloyd-Jones) (1962). Greek Metre. Oxford.
- Raven, D. S. (1962). Greek Metre: An Introduction. Faber & Faber.
- Raven, D. S. (1965). Latin Metre: An Introduction. Faber & Faber.
- West, M. L. (1982). Greek Metre. Oxford.
- West, M. L. (1987). An Introduction to Greek Metre. Oxford.
