= Anaclasis (poetry) =

Feature of poetic metre

Anaclasis /əˈnækləsɪs/ (from the Greek ἀνάκλασις "bending back, reflection") is a feature of poetic metre, in which a long and a short syllable (or long and anceps syllable) exchange places in a metrical pattern.

Ancient metricians used the term principally of the Greek galliambic rhythm | u u – u | – u – – |, which they believed was derived from a regular ionic dimeter | u u – – | u u – – | by a reversal of syllables 4 and 5, creating metra of unequal length | u u – u | and | – – u – |.

Although the original meaning of the term anaclasis referred to situations when the substitution of u – for – u occurred across the boundary between two metra, in modern times scholars have extended the term to any situation where the sequence x – (anceps + long) responds to – x (long + anceps) in a parallel part of a verse or poem. Thus for example, Martin West applies the term to metres of the aeolic type, in which sometimes | – x – u | or | u – u – | are treated as interchangeable with | – u u – |.

A similar phenomenon has also been observed in classical Persian poetry, for example in the metre of the ruba'i (quatrain), in which the iambic | u – u – | and choriambic | – u u – | rhythms can be used as alternatives in the same poem. Persian also exhibits a second form of anaclasis, in which the ionic dimeter | u u – – | u u – – | exists alongside | u – u – | u u – – |, with reversal of syllables 2 and 3. The metrician Paul Kiparsky has argued that anaclasis (or "syncopation") is a common feature of Greek, Sanskrit, and Persian metres and believes that is inherited from Indo-European poetry.

In English a feature similar to anaclasis can be found in inversion in the iambic pentameter, when stressed and unstressed elements are reversed, especially at the beginning of a line.

In optics, the word "anaclasis" refers to the bending of light as it passes from a less dense to a more dense medium. A ray of light entering a pool of water from an angle will be bent downwards.

Connected with anaclasis is the adjective anaclastic, but this is a relatively modern formation, first recorded, in an optical sense, in the 18th century.

== Ancient metrical writers ==
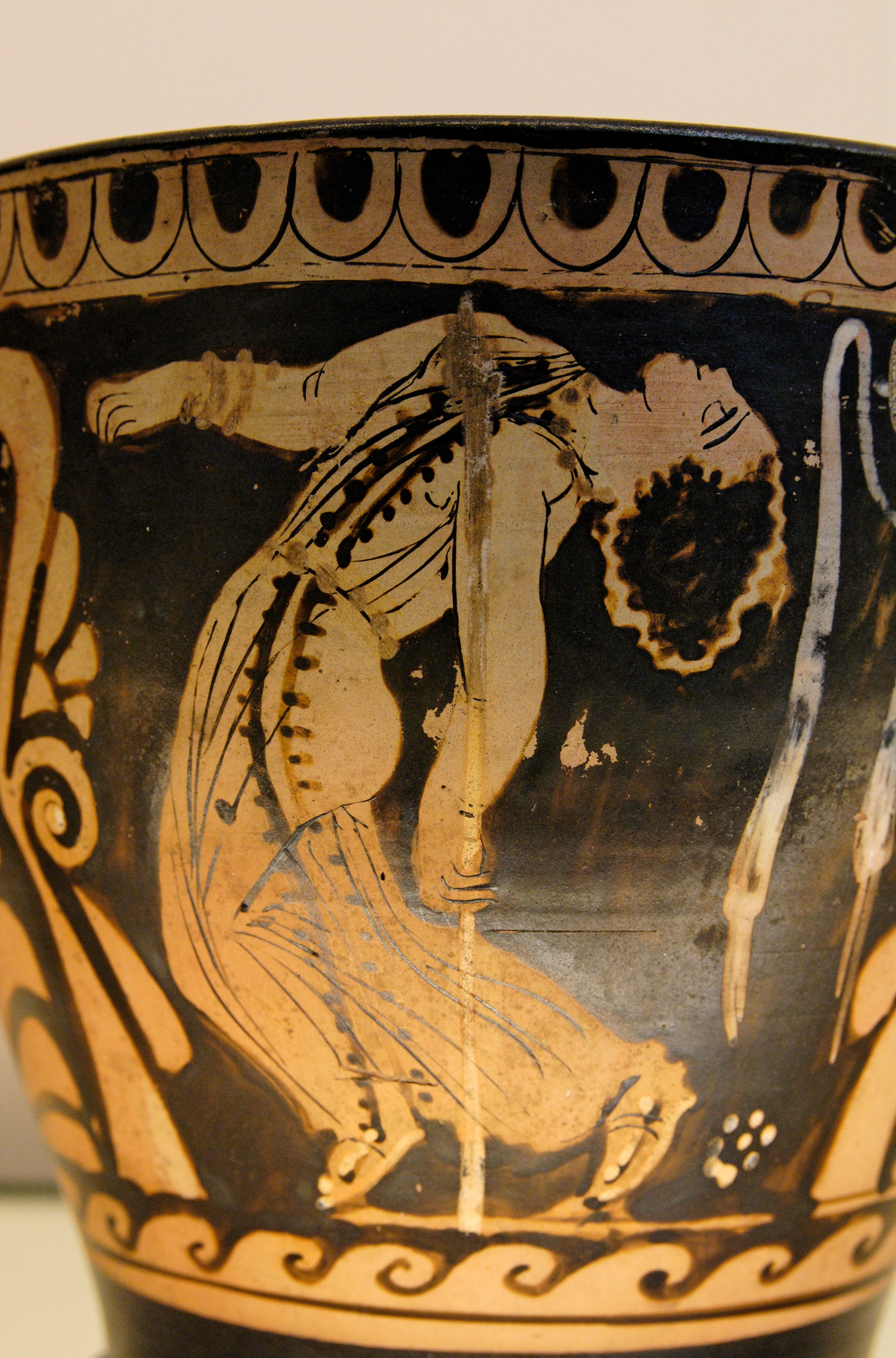
Dancing maenad. Detail from an ancient Greek Paestum red figure skyphos, made by Python, c. 330–320 BC. British Museum, London

The Greek word ἀνάκλασις "bending backwards; reflection" comes from the verb κλἀω "I break or break off (e.g. a branch)". From this comes the compound ἀνακλάω "I bend back; reflect", which seems often to be used of bending back the neck; another meaning is of light or sound being reflected.

In its metrical sense the noun anaclasis is in fact used by only one ancient writer, Marius Victorinus, but the related present participle ἀνακλώμενος (anaklṓmenos) "being bent back, being reflected" is used by several metrical writers, namely by Victorinus himself, Hephaestion, Atilius Fortunatianus, and Choeroboscus, mostly with reference to the galliambic metre.

The author of On the Sublime (attributed to "Longinus", 1st century AD) uses the perfect participle ἀνακεκλασμένος (anakeklasménos) "broken up" in a similar context, in the phrase ῥυθμὸς ἀνακεκλασμένος λόγων καὶ σεσοβημένος (rhuthmòs anakeklasménos lógōn kaì sesobēménos) "a speech rhythm which is broken up and agitated". He says this is caused by the introduction of pyrrhics (u u), trochees (– u) and dichorees (– u – u) "which ultimately degenerate into dance rhythms".

Hephaestion (2nd century AD) discusses how the ionic dimeter can be either "pure" or "mixed". The pure form is | u u – – | u u – – |, while the mixed form is either | u u – u | – u – – | or | – – u | u u u – – |, combining a metron of 5 time units with one of 7 time units. In this passage he states that the galliambic metre was later called ἀνακλώμενον "being bent back". (However, the text of this passage is uncertain and it is possible that the words "later it was called anaclomenon" are a later addition.)

Marius Victorinus (4th century AD) also discusses the combining of a five-time-unit metron and a seven-time-unit metron to form the galliambic rhythm. He adds that musicians refer to this phenomenon as anaclasis and says that the metra are called anaclomena "because they lean backwards (quod retrorsum inclinantur) in the same way as our bodies lean backwards in certain dance movements". Presumably such dances were like that of the accompanying illustration, which shows a female worshipper of Dionysus. It is possible, however, that the name comes not from dance-movements but from the fact that the second metron "bends back" to take up part of the time of the first one.

Another 4th-century metrician Atilius Fortunatianus also uses the term anaclomenon, although the poetic example he gives is not completely galliambic but in a metre which consists of two anacreontics without catalexis.

George Choeroboscus (9th century AD?), in a discussion of the galliambic metre, suggests another possible etymology for the word ἀνακλώμενον: he says it is possible that the name comes from the weakness (κλάσις) and softness of the voice of the galli (eunuch priests) who sang hymns in this metre.

The idea that anaclasis means "bending backwards" explains the poet Martial's use of the adjective supīnus "lying on its back" to describe the galliambic when he gives his reasons for refusing to write either in the galliambic or in the sotadean metre:

quod nec carmine glōrior supīnō
nec retrō lego Sōtadēn cinaedum,

"Because I don't boast in poems which lie on their back,
nor do I read the cinaedus Sotades backwards..."

The second line refers to the fact that certain dactylic hexameter lines, if the words are arranged in the reverse order, turn into sotadeans.

== Greek and Latin ionic metres ==
=== Anacreontic ===
An early example of anaclasis in an ionic metre is found in the fragments of the poet Anacreon (late 6th century BC), who would often mix anacreontic and pure ionic dimeters in the same poem. D. S. Raven quotes this example:

γλυκεροῦ δ᾽οὐκέτι πολλὸς
βιότου χρόνος λέλειπται

glukeroû d᾽oukéti pollòs
biótou khrónos léleiptai

u u – – | u u – – (pure ionic)
u u – u | – u – – (with anaclasis)

"And there is no longer much time
of sweet life left"

The anacreontic continued to be a popular metre into Byzantine times. In this period, there was a tendency for the word accent to follow the metre. According to Martin West, in the case of the anacreontic, in Byzantine times the accent tended to fall on the 4th and especially on the 7th position of the line: u u – u′ – u –′ –. This would have given it a strongly syncopated rhythm, different from the alternating rhythm of an iambic line.

Not all modern metrical specialists agree that the anacreontic derives from the ionic. According to the metricians Chris Golston and Tomas Riad, the anacreontic is the more basic rhythm and the ionic is derived from it. Similarly Martin West writes: "We are hampered by not knowing whether u u – u – u – – and u u – – u u – – are of separate origin, and if not, which was primary."

=== Galliambic ===
The metre most closely associated with the term "anaclasis" is the galliambic, the music sung by the eunuch devotees of the goddess Cybele. The best known example is Catullus's Attis (poem 63). It consists of two anacreontics, the second one catalectic and with a resolution in the last metron:

super alta vectus Attis celerī rate maria
u u – u | – u – – || u u – u u u u –
"Attis, after sailing over the high seas in a swift ship..."

The first half has anaclasis, but the resolution in the second half makes it difficult to say if it has anaclasis or not.

Apart from two lines quoted by Hephaestion, neither of which seems to have anaclasis, no poems in this metre survive in ancient Greek.

=== Sotadean ===
A third metre using anaclasis is the sotadean, named after the 3rd century BC poet Sotades. It is found in both Greek and Latin. The metre is usually analysed in terms of the ionicus a maiore (– – uu). The surviving examples have several forms, but the most common is one which has an ionic rhythm in the first half, and a trochaic rhythm in the second:

ter corripuī terribilem manū bipennem (Petronius)
– – u u | – – u u | – u – u | – –
"Three times I seized the terrible two-edged axe with my hand"

Sometimes, in addition to the 3rd metron, the trochaic rhythm is also found in the first or second metron:

quodcumqu(e) homin(ī) accidit lubēre, posse rētur (Plautus)
– – u u | – u – u | – u – u | – –
"whatever happens to be pleasing to a man, he thinks it's possible"

In another variation, the trochaic or ionic 6-mora metron is replaced by a 7-mora metron such as – u – – or – – – u.

As with anacreontic poems, sotadean lines are sometimes mixed in the same poem with lines of pure ionic metre.

Since it is not known whether the ionic or the anacreontic was the original metre, it is unclear whether the sotadean should be thought of as being basically ionic with anaclasis in the second half, or basically trochaic with anaclasis in the first half.

== Aeolic metres ==
The term anaclasis, originally used only of ionic metres, was expanded by modern metricians from Wilamowitz (1886) onwards to include other types of metre, including aeolic. The most common and basic form of aeolic is the glyconic, of which the basic form is this:

x x – u u – u –

Aeolic metres are usually described as being built up from an aeolic base (x x), followed by a choriamb (– u u –), then an iambic ending (u – –). Paul Kiparsky, however, argues that it is likely that the eight-syllable glyconic originated in a simple iambic dimeter by anaclasis:

x – u – | u – u – (iambic dimeter)
x – – u | u – u – (glyconic)

Similarly Kiparsky argues that the minor asclepiad and the phalaecian hendecasyllable can be seen as developments of the iambic trimeter:

x – u – | u – u – | u – u – (iambic trimeter)
x – – u | u – u – | u – – (phalaecian hendecasyllable)
x – – u | u – – u | u – u – (minor asclepiad)

An example of the hendecasyllable is the following from Catullus:

vīvāmus mea Lesbi(a) atqu(e) amēmus
"Let's live, my Lesbia, and let us love"

The glyconic metre also sometimes itself undergoes anaclasis. For example, in the example below the second line has the normal form of the glyconic ending in u – u –, while the first line has a rarer anaclastic form ending in – u u –:

ὑπὲρ ἀκαρπίστων πεδίων
Σικελίας Ζεφύρου πνοαῖς

hupèr akarpístōn pedíōn
Sikelías Zephúrou pnoaîs

uu u – – – u u –
uu u – u u – u –

"over the unharvested plains
of Sicily with the Zephyr's breezes"

The telesillean metre (which is a headless glyconic) similarly has two forms. For example, the following line, which comes from the strophe (first part) of a choral ode, has the anaclastic form, while the second line, which comes from the corresponding place in the antistrophe (answering part) has the normal form:

τί χρή, θανόντα νιν ἤ
tí khrḗ, thanónta nin ḗ
u – u – u u –

χωρεῖν, πρὸ δόμων λέγου-
khōreîn, prò dómōn légou-
– – u u – u –

== Classical Persian ==
The ionic rhythm is common in medieval Persian poetry, together with variations which have been thought to arise from it by anaclasis. In fact some of the very earliest poems recorded in modern Persian of the Islamic period, dating from the 9th century AD, were in the ionic metre. According to a count of 20,000 lyric poems made by L. P. Elwell-Sutton, fully two-thirds of lyric poems in classical Persian are in the ionic rhythm or one of its two anaclastic forms.

=== Ruba'i ===
Most classical Persian poetry has only one metre throughout the poem, but one kind of poetry, the ruba'i (quatrain), mixes two metres, one pure ionic (or choriambic) and the other with anaclasis. A ruba'i can be in one metre or the other, or a random mixture. The form with anaclasis is the more common.

For example, one of Omar Khayyam's quatrains begins as follows:

'ey dūst biyā tā qam-e fardā na-khorīm
v-īn yek-dam-e ʾomr-rā qanīmat šomarīm

– | – (u) u – | – u u – | – u u – | (pure ionic)
– | – u u – | (u) – u – | – u u – | (with anaclasis)

"O friend, come, let us not eat the sorrow of tomorrow,
but count this one moment of life as a blessing."

In this poem, the two underlined syllables are "overlong", that is, they stand for a long + a short syllable in the metrical pattern (a typical feature of Persian poetry).

The division into metra here is suggested by Farzaad, on the basis of the places where the ruba'i usually has a caesura.

=== Persian anacreontic ===
Another metre with anaclasis of the same type is the following by Saadi (13th century), which is very similar to the anacreontic of Greek poetry:

man agar nazar harām ast * bas-ī gonāh dāram
če konam? nemītavānam * ke nazar negāh dāram

| u u – u – u – – || u u – u – u – – |

"If looking is forbidden, I have sinned a lot.
What am I to do? I can't stop looking."

As in the previous example, the underlined syllables are "overlong". These count in Persian metre as equivalent to – u.

This metre is, however, rather rare, being found in just 0.6% of lyric poems.

=== A second type of anaclasis ===
Two of the most common metres in Persian are the following:

x u – – | u u – – | u u – – | u u –
u – u – | u u – – | u – u – | u u –

According to Elwell-Sutton's count, the first is used for nearly 10% of lyric poems. The second for nearly 13%.

Although these two metres are never used together in the same poem, it has been suggested that one is an anaclastic form of the other. But it differs from the previous type of anaclasis in that in this case it is not the 4th and 5th, but the 2nd and 3rd syllables that are reversed.

An example of the second metre is the following poem by Hafez (14th century):

šekofte šod gol-e hamrā vo gašt bolbol mast
salā-ye sarkhoši ey sūfiyān-e bāde-parast

| u – u – | u u – – | u – (u) – | – – |
| u – u – | u u – – | u – u – | u u – |

"A red rose has bloomed and the nightingale has become intoxicated:
it is the call to pleasure, o Sufis, worshippers of wine!"

== In Sanskrit poetry ==
Paul Kiparsky, following the work of E. V. Arnold (1905), has examined some of the ways anaclasis (or syncopation) has operated in the development of Sanskrit poetry from the time of the early Vedic hymns to the classical period. The Vedic meters anuṣṭubh (4 × 8 syllables), gāyatrī (3 × 8), and two main types of trimeters, jagatī (4 × 12) and its catalectic form triṣṭubh (4 × 11) are very largely iambic, usually with the rhythm x – x – | u – u x (where x = anceps).

The following stanza is in the jagatī metre (equivalent to an iambic trimeter):

sá íd váne namasyúbhir vacasyate
cā́ru jáneṣu prabruvāṇá indriyám
vŕ̥ṣā chándur bhavati haryató vŕ̥ṣā
kṣémeṇa dhénām maghávā yád ínvati

u – u – | u – u – | u – u –
– u u – | u – u – | u – u –
u – – – | u u u – | u – u –
– – u – | – u u – | u – u u

As can be seen, the rhythm is mainly iambic, especially in the last metron of each line. In the other metra there is the occasional deviation from iambic, in all but one case (u u u –) attributable to anaclasis.

If the heroic śloka is compared with the earlier anuṣṭubh it can be seen to have changed. The substitution of u – for – u in positions 2 and 3 has become so frequent that the first half of each verse is no longer recognisable as iambic. The iambic rhythm (u – u x) remains at the end of the second and fourth dimeter, but the 1st and 3rd dimeter have undergone another anaclasis and almost always end with a trochee (u – – x) instead of an iamb. An example is the opening stanza of the Bhagavadgita:

dharma-kṣetre kuru-kṣetre
samavetā yuyutsavaḥ
māmakāḥ pāṇḍavāś caiva
kim akurvata sañjaya?

| – – – – | u – – – | (trochaic ending)
| u u – – | u – u – || (iambic ending)
| – u – – | u – – u | (trochaic ending)
| u u – u | u – u u || (iambic ending)

"In the place of righteousness, at Kurukṣetra,
gathered together and desiring battle,
my sons and the sons of Pandu,
what did they do, Sanjaya?"

== In English poetry ==
An analogous process to anaclasis can be seen in English pentameter poetry, where it is known as "inversion" or substitution. As with anaclasis here are two types: the substitution of a trochee for an iamb, and vice versa. Both types are illustrated in the second line of Shelley's Ode to the West Wind:

O wild West Wind, thou breath of Autumn's being,
Thou, from whose unseen presence the leaves dead
Are driven, like ghosts from an enchanter fleeing.

The words "Thou from" (Strong-Weak) substitute a trochee for an iamb, but "the leaves" (Weak-Strong) substitute an iamb for a trochee.

Anaclasis has also been compared with the syncopated rhythms of Scottish folk-music such as the tune of Robert Burns's Comin' Thro' the Rye, where the rhythms – u u –, u – – u, and – u – u are used interchangeably.

== Bibliography ==
- Arnold, E. V. (1905). Vedic metre in its historical development, Cambridge.
- Elwell-Sutton, L. P. (1975). "The Foundations of Persian Prosody and Metrics". Iran, vol 13. (Available on JSTOR.)
- Elwell-Sutton, L. P. (1976). The Persian Metres. Cambridge University Press.
- Farzaad, Masuud (1942). The Metre of the Robaaii. Tehran
- Farzaad, M. (1967). Persian poetic meters: a synthetic study. Leiden: Brill
- Golston, C., & Riad, T. (2005). "The phonology of Greek lyric meter". Journal of Linguistics, 41(1), 77–115.
- Hayes, Bruce (1979). "The rhythmic structure of Persian verse." Edebiyat 4, 193–242.
- Kiparsky, P. (2018). "Indo-European origins of the Greek hexameter". In Hackstein, O., & Gunkel, D. (2018). Language and Meter (pp. 77–128). Brill.
- Mulroy, D. (1976). "Hephaestion and Catullus 63". Phoenix, 30(1), 61–72.
- Nauta, R. (2004). "Hephaestion and Catullus 63 again". Mnemosyne, 57(5), 651–656.
- Raven, D. S. (1965). Latin Metre: An Introduction. (Faber).
- Sapsford, Tom (2022). Performing the Kinaidos: Unmanly Men in Ancient Mediterranean Cultures (Oxford).
- West, M. L. (1982). "Three topics in Greek metre". The Classical Quarterly, 32(2), 281–297.
- West, M. L. (1987). Introduction to Greek Metre (Oxford).
