= Sotadean metre =

Poetic metre used in Ancient Greek and Latin

The sotadean metre (pronounced: /soʊtəˈdiən/) was a rhythmic pattern used by and named after the 3rd-century BC Greek poet Sotades. It is generally classified as a type of ionic metre, though in fact it is half ionic and half trochaic. It has several variations, but the usual pattern is this:

– – u u | – – u u | – u – u | – –

An example from Petronius is:

ter corripuī terribilem manū bipennem
"three times I seized the terrible two-edged axe with my hand"

A characteristic of the sotadean metre is its variability. Sometimes the trochaic rhythm (– u – u) is found in the first metron or the second; sometimes the ionic rhythm (– – u u) continues through the whole line. Usually each metron has exactly 6 morae, but there is also a less strict type of sotadean found in some writers in which a metron may have 7 morae, such as – u – –, – – – u, or – – u –. There is also frequent resolution (substitution of two shorts for a long syllable).

The sotadean was used both in Greek and in Latin literature, and by several authors, but it is not very common. It had a reputation for being vulgar and indecent; but it was also sometimes used for more serious purposes, for example, didactic poems such as Lucius Accius's now lost history of Greek and Latin poetry, or Terentianus Maurus's grammatical treatise on the letters of the alphabet.

The lost treatise Thalia by the heretical Christian theologian Arius is also sometimes said to have been written in sotadean metre, but it has been shown to be in a slightly different type, longer by one syllable.

== Construction ==
=== Basic form ===
The sotadean is considered by ancient metricians such as Hephaestion (2nd century AD) and Marius Victorinus (4th century AD) to be based on the ionicus a maiore rhythm (– – u u). According to Victorinus there were two main types of sotadean, the pure ionic, consisting of four ionic metra with the last two syllables deleted:

– – u u | – – u u | – – u u | – –

The other type has two ionic metra followed by an ithyphallic (i.e. two trochees and a spondee):

– – u u | – – u u | – u – u | – –

According to Victorinus, some metricians liked to call the first type sotadicus and the second type sotadeus. However, other metricians do not make this distinction; for example, Quintilian calls both kinds sotadeus.

The process whereby – u – u is substituted for – – u u is known as anaclasis. It is, however, uncertain which of these two rhythms is primary and which is derivative.

Most modern metricians, such as Martin West, follow the same analysis as Hephaestion and Victorinus, although D. S. Raven suggested an alternative analysis based on the ionicus a minore (u u – –) with the first two syllables omitted, as follows:

– – | u u – – | u u – u | – u – –

However, he admits that the difference is "purely theoretical". Other scholars have sought to explain the sotadean as a kind of aeolic metre.

=== Variations ===
There are frequent variations in the metre. Sometimes the trochaic rhythm (– u – u) is used in the first or second metron as well as the third (rarely in all three):

– u – u | – – u u | – u – u | – –

– – u u | – u – u | – u – u | – –

Resolution (the substitution of two short syllables for a long one) is common, so that lines such as the following may be found:

– – u u | – – u u | – u u u u | – –

u u u u u u | – – u u | – u – u | – –

Sometimes the line starts with two anapaests, or an ionicus a minore and anapaest, such as the following:

u u – u u | –, u u u u | –, u – u | – –

u u – – | u u –, u u | – u – u | – –

There is also sometimes contraction of two short syllables into one long one, for example:

– – u u | – – – | – u u u u | – –

In all these variations, whatever the shape of the metron, in most writers it remains equal to six morae or time units. The beginning of each metron (marked in bold in the examples below) comes at regular intervals. In some writers, however, such as in the lines quoted by Stobaeus, or in the Latin sotadeans of Plautus, Accius and Varro, occasionally a metron of 7 time-units is allowed, such as | – u – – | or | – – – u |. For example:

u u u – – | – – – | – u – u | – –

– u u u u | –, u u u u | – – – u | – –

Many of the surviving verses have a caesura after the fifth syllable. Occasionally, however, the caesura is found after the sixth syllable. There is also often a caesura after the 9th syllable.

The final syllable of the line, as usual in stichic verse, is brevis in longo; that is, the line may end with a short syllable which counts as long because of its position at the end of the line.

== Reputation ==
Sotadean verses had a reputation for being indecent and effeminate. The educationist Quintilian says that love elegies, hendecasyllables, and sotadeans were unsuitable for teaching to boys, adding "concerning sotadeans I do not even need to give a warning" (dē sōtadēīs nē praecipiendum quidem est). Pliny the Younger in one of his letters feels it necessary to make excuses for his sometimes reading comedies, mimes, lyric poems, and sotadeans, which some people thought undignified for a gentleman.

In one of his hendecasyllabic poems Martial writes dismissively of the galliambic and the sotadean metres and gives his reasons for refusing to write in them:

quod nec carmine glōrior supīnō
nec retrō lego Sōtadēn cinaedum,

"Because I don't boast in poems which lie on their back
nor do I read the cinaedus Sotades backwards..."

In the word supīnō Martial alludes to the fact that galliambic verses (the metre of songs sung by the galli or eunuch devotees of the goddess Cybele) were regularly described as anaclomenon "leaning backwards" by Greek and Roman metricians. In the second line he calls Sotades a cinaedus ("passive homosexual"), and refers to the fact that in some cases a dactylic hexameter, if read with the words in the reverse order, becomes a sotadean. He says that these metres are appropriate for the likes of Palaemon, a grammarian and minor poet of the age of Nero, notorious for his dissolute life, homosexuality, and loose morals.

Quintilian's example of a reversible hexameter is the following:

astra tenet caelum, mare classēs, ārea messem
"the sky holds the stars, the sea fleets, and a threshing-floor the harvest"

which when reversed becomes a sotadean of the pure ionic kind:

mess(em) ārea, classēs mare, caelum tenet astra

– – u u, | – – u u, | – – u u | – –

Sotades is said to have rewritten Homer's Iliad in ionic metre. The author of the treatise On Style attributed to "Demetrius" (possibly 2nd century BC), quotes one of the lines. Taking the Homeric line:

σείων Πηλιάδα μελίην κατὰ δεξιὸν ὦμον (Homer, Iliad, 22.133)
seíōn Pēliáda melíēn katà dexiòn ômon
"brandishing his Pelian ash-spear on his right shoulder"

Sotades rearranged the words to make a sotadean line:

σείων μελίην Πηλιάδα δεξιὸν κατ᾽ ὦμον (Sotades, fragment 4a (Powell))
seíōn melíēn Pēliáda dexiòn kat᾽ ômon

– – u u | –, – u u, | – u – u | – –

The author of On Style objected strongly to this rhythm, calling it "weak", "undignified", and "somewhat effeminate". He added: "the line seems to undergo a metamorphosis, just like those men who change from male to female in myths".

In the 4th century AD, Athanasius of Alexandria repeatedly castigates Arius for imitating the metre of Sotades in his theological treatise Thalia. He calls the metre effeminate and undignified, and criticises Arius for "imitating Salome's dance and playing" instead of using a more solemn style. Similarly, Gregory of Nyssa criticised the prose rhythms of Eunomius of Cyzicus (a follower of Arius) as resembling "mincing and effeminate sotadeans" which seemed to him to go along "tapping with the foot and clicking with the fingers in time with the rhythm". West comments: "This passage is valuable as an indication of the method of delivery of real sotadeans."

== Similar metres ==
D. S. Raven points out that another metre very similar to the sotadean is the anacreontic, made popular by the 6th-century BC singer Anacreon. In the following couplet, an ionic dimeter is combined with an anacreontic. The resultant line resembles a sotadean, except that it has an extra two short syllables at the beginning; and also the caesura is placed later:

γλυκεροῦ δ᾽οὐκέτι πολλὸς
βιότου χρόνος λέλειπται

glukeroû d᾽oukéti pollòs
biótou khrónos léleiptai

u u – – | u u – – || u u – u | – u – –

"And there is no longer much time
of sweet life left"

Another related metre of the Ionic type is the galliambic, used by Catullus in his poem 63. This consists of an anacreontic half line, followed by a catalectic anacreontic with resolution:

super alta vectus Attis celerī rate maria
u u – u | – u – – || u u – u | u u u –
"Attis, after sailing over the high seas in a swift ship..."

In terms of subject-matter (self-emasculation) Catullus's poem 63 is reminiscent of the poem in sotadeans by Petronius quoted below.

Quintilian suggests that the hendecasyllable line appears to be a shorter version of the sotadean:

x x – u u – u – u – –
vīvāmus mea Lesbi(a) atqu(e) amēmus

However, nowadays the hendecasyllable is classed as a type of Aeolic metre, a different species of Greek poetry. The hendecasyllable also lacks the variability seen in the sotadean; for example, it never has resolution or (except in Catullus' poems 55 and 58B) contraction.

== Greek examples ==
In the following examples, the beginning of each foot is marked in bold.

=== The mouse proverb ===
Possibly one of the earliest lines in the sotadean metre is the following:

ὤδινεν ὄρος, Ζεὺς δ’ ἐφοβεῖτο, τὸ δ’ ἔτεκεν μῦν
ṓdinen óros, Zeùs d’ ephobeîto, tò d’ éteken mûn

– – u u | –, – u u | – u, u u u | – –

"A mountain was in labour, and Zeus was scared; but it gave birth to a mouse."

The proverb is famous since it recurs in Horace's well known hexameter line:

parturient montēs, nāscētur rīdiculus mūs
"the mountains will be in labour, but all that will be born is a ridiculous mouse".

It also occurs in Phaedrus's version (book 4.24) of Aesop's fables.

The Greek verse is included in a story recounted by Athenaeus. It was supposedly said by the 4th-century BC Egyptian King Tachōs to the Spartan king Agesilaus mocking him for his small stature. If it is true, it puts the beginning of the sotadean metre about 360 BC. However, some scholars believe that the verse may simply be a quotation from a later poem by Sotades or one of his imitators.

Because of the resolution in the 3rd metron, it is unclear whether the verse is pure iambic, or has anaclasis.

=== Sotades ===
The 3rd-century poet Sotades of Alexandria has been described as a "sort of court jester travelling from one kingdom to another and making a living from poking fun at Hellenistic rulers". Only a few lines from his poetry have survived, some of an obscene or satiric nature. The following gives a flavour:

ὁ δ’ ἀποστεγάσας τὸ τρῆμα τῆς ὄπισθε λαύρης
διὰ δενδροφόρου φάραγγος ἐξέωσε βροντὴν
ἠλέματον, ὁκοίην ἀροτὴρ γέρων χαλᾶι βοῦς.

ho d’ apostegásas tò trêma tês ópisthe laúrēs
dià dendrophórou phárangos exéōse brontḕn
ēlématon, hokoíēn arotḕr gérōn khalâi boûs.

u u –   u u | –, u  – u | – u – u | – –
u u –   u u | –, u  – u | – u – u | – –
–   u u u u | –  –, u u | – u – u | – –

"And he, uncovering the hole of his back passage,
through a tree-lined chasm pushed out a thunderclap,
an idle one, such as an old plough-ox lets loose."

This extract shows two features typical of the metre: frequent resolution in the first metron, and anaclasis (inversion of – u) in the third metron and occasionally in the second metron also. The third line has a delayed caesura.

Another line is the following, which Athenaeus and Plutarch inform us was written in criticism of the incestuous marriage between King Ptolemy II Philadelphus and his full-sister Arsinoe II, which took place about 273 BC:

εἰς οὐχ ὁσίην τρυμαλιὴν τὸ κέντρον ὠθεῖς.

eis oukh hosíēn trumaliḕn tò kéntron ōtheîs.

– – u u | –, – u u | –, u – u | – –

"You are thrusting your goad into a hole which is not holy."

But as well as satiric poems such as the above, Sotades is also said to have rewritten the story of Homer's Iliad in sotadean metre. The following extract is in a more serious style:

Ἔνθ' οἱ μὲν ἐπ' ἄκραισι πυραῖς νέκυες ἔκειντο
γῆς ἐπὶ ξένης, ὀρφανὰ τείχεα προλιπόντες
Ἑλλάδος ἱερῆς, καὶ μυχὸν ἑστίης πατρῴης
ἥβην τ' ἐρατὴν καὶ καλὸν ἡλίου πρόσωπον.

Énth' hoi mèn ep' ákraisi puraîs nékues ékeinto
gês epì xénēs, orphanà teíkhea prolipóntes
Helládos hierês, kaì mukhòn hestíēs patrṓiēs
hḗbēn t' eratḕn kaì kalòn hēlíou prósōpon.

– –  u   u | –  – u u | –, u u u u | – –
– u  –   u | –, – u u | –  u u u u | – –
– u  u u u | –, – u u | –  u  –  u | – –
– –    u u | –, – u u | –  u  –  u | – –

"There the dead were lying at the top of pyres
on foreign ground, having abandoned the orphaned walls
of holy Greece and the sanctum of the ancestral hearth
and lovely youth and the beautiful face of the sun."

=== Stobaeus's anthology ===
Some lines attributed to Sotades were included in an anthology collected by Stobaeus (5th century AD). However, it is not thought that they were composed by Sotades himself, first because the dialect is different, and secondly because the metre has metrical licences, such as 7-mora metra, of the kind not used in the genuine fragments of Sotades.

Μιμοῦ τὸ καλόν, καὶ μενεῖς ἐν βροτοῖς ἄριστος.
Νόμος ἐστὶ θεός. τοῦτον ἀεὶ πάντοτε τίμα.

Mimoû tò kalón, kaì meneîs en brotoîs áristos.
Nómos estì theós. toûton aeì pántote tíma.

–   – u u | –, – u – | – u – u | – –
u u – u u | –, – u u | – – u u | – – (ionic)

"Imitate the good, and you will remain best among mortals.
Law is a god. Honour it always and forever."

In the first line above there is a 7-mora iambic metron (– – u –). The second line, apart from the resolution of the first element, is purely ionic. There is a strong caesura after the fifth element in both lines, however, in the manner of Sotades.

Another example has an irrationally long first metron:

ξένος ὀφείλεις εἶναι τῶν οὐ καλῶς φρονούντων
xénos opheíleis eînai tôn ou kalôs phronoúntōn

u u u – – | – – – | – u – u | – –

"You should be a stranger to those who do not think well."

In the second line of the following extract, the trochaic rhythm is found in both the second metron and the third:

ὁ πένης ἐλεεῖται, ὁ δὲ πλούσιος φθονεῖται
ὁ μέσως δὲ βίος κεκραμένος δίκαιός ἐστιν.

ho pénēs eleeîtai, ho dè ploúsios phthoneîtai
ho mésōs dè bíos kekraménos díkaiós estin.

uu – u u | – –, u u | – u – u | – –
uu – u u | –, u – u | – u – u | – –

"The poor man is pitied, the rich man envied;
but the life mixed moderately is a righteous one."

Another 16-line fragment ends with wry humour as follows:

πουλύποδα φαγὼν ὁ Διογένης ὠμὸν τέθνηκεν.
Αἰσχύλῳ γράφοντί <τι> ἐπιπέπτωκε χελώνη.
Σοφοκλῆς ῥᾶγα φαγὼν σταφυλῆς πνιγεὶς τέθνηκε.
κύνες οἱ κατὰ Θρᾴκην Εὐριπίδην ἔτρωγον.
τὸν θεῖον Ὅμηρον λιμὸς κατεδαπάνησεν.

poulúpoda phagṑn ho Diogénēs ōmòn téthnēken.
Aiskhúlōi gráphontí <ti> epipéptōke khelṓnē.
Sophoklês rhâga phagṑn staphulês pnigeìs téthnēke.
kúnes hoi katà Thrā́ikēn Euripídēn étrōgon.
tòn theîon Hómēron limòs katedapánēsen.

– u u u u | –, u u u u | – – –   u | – –
– u – u   | – u u, u u | – –   u u | – –
u u – –   | u u –, u u | – u –   u | – –
u u – u u | –   –, –   | – u –   u | – –
–   – u u | –   –, –   | – u u u u | – –

"Diogenes died after eating a raw octopus;
When Aeschylus was writing something, a tortoise fell on his head;
Sophocles died when he choked after eating a grape from a bunch;
The dogs in Thrace devoured Euripides;
As for the divine Homer, famine consumed him."

Again, the style of the metre here is irregular. In the first line above, there is resolution in the first two metra, while the third has seven morae. In the second, the trochaic rhythm is found in the first metron but not in the third. The third line starts with ionic a minore instead of the usual a maiore.

=== Charition Mime ===
Some papyri found in Egypt contain sotadeans, but they are fragmentary.

Papyrus P. Oxy. 413 has part of a play, known as the "Charition Mime", mostly in prose, in which an intoxicated Indian king bursts into sotadean verse, addressing the moon goddess Selene. The poem begins with these words:

βάρβαρον ἀνάγω χορὸν ἄπλετον, θεὰ Σελήνη
πρὸς ῥυθμὸν ἀνέτῳ βήματι βαρβάρῳ προβαίνων

bárbaron anágō khoròn ápleton, theà Selḗnē
pròs rhuthmòn anétōi bḗmati barbárōi probaínōn

– u u u u | – u u u u | – u – u | – –
– u u u u | – –   u u | – u – u | – –

"I lead an immense barbarian chorus, goddess Selene
(advancing) to a rhythm with loose barbarian step..."

There are two further lines but incomplete. The runs of short syllables perhaps give some idea of the exotic frenzied music which presumably accompanied the dance.

=== Iolaus Narrative ===
Another papyrus fragment, called the Iolaus Narrative, possibly a novel, also contains a poem in sotadean verse, apparently addressed by a gallos (eunuch) to a kinaidos (homosexual), but the poem is very fragmentary and difficult to interpret. It begins with an entirely trochaic line, though other lines or surviving parts of lines contain ionic metra also:

εὐγενῆ Ἰόλαε χαῖρε καὶ κιναιδὲ σιώπη
eugenê Iólae khaîre kaì kinaidè siṓpē

– u – u u | – u – u | – u – u u | – –
"Noble Iolaus, greetings, and, kinaidos, silence!"

=== Paccius Maximus ===
Dated to the late 1st century AD is an inscription in a temple in Kalabsha on the border of southern Egypt. It is by a Roman cavalry officer called Paccius Maximus, and the initial letters of the first 22 lines make an acrostic: ΜΑΞΙΜΟΣ ΔΕΚΟΥΡΙΩΝ ΕΓΡΑΨΑ "I, Decurion Maximus, wrote this". The poem begins as follows, explaining how Maximus was inspired to write a poem:

Μακάριον ὅτ᾽ ἐβην ἠρεμίης τόπον ἐσαθρῆσαι
Ἀέρι τὸ ποθεινὸν ψυχῆς πνεῦμα ἐπαρῆσθαι
Ξένα μοι βιοτὴ περὶ φρένα πάντοθεν ἐδονεῖτο
Ἴστορα κακίης ἐμαυτὸν οὐκ ἔχων ἔλεγχον
Μύστην τότε κίκλησκεν φύσις πόνον γεωργεῖν

Makárion hót᾽ ebēn ēremíēs tópon esathrêsai
Aéri tò potheinòn psukhês pneûma eparêsthai
Xéna moi biotḕ perì phréna pántothen edoneîto
Ístora kakíēs emautòn ouk ékhōn élenkhon
Mústēn tóte kíklēsken phúsis pónon geōrgeîn

u u u u u u | –  –   u u | – u u u u | – –
–   u u u u | –  –   –   | – –   u u | – –
u u –   u u | –  u u u u | – u u u u | – –
–   u u u u | –  u –   u | – u –   u | – –
–   –   u u | u  –  –  u | – u –   u | – –

"When I went to catch sight of the blessed place of the desert,
to release my soul's beloved breath with air,
my life was being struck in my mind from all sides in a strange way;
since I had no proof that I knew evil,
my nature was calling me then to cultivate a mystic labour."

The metre is purely ionic until line 4. In line 5 there is an unusual antispast metron (u – – u). However, throughout the poem the metra have the regular length of 6 morae.

In the 19th line of this poem, Maximus describes the practice of tapping the body with a stick to help in keeping time in this complex metre:

ῥάβδῳ δέ τις οἷα κατὰ μέλος δέμας δονηθείς,
ἁρμογὴν μέλει συνεργὸν ἐπεκάλουν χαράττειν

rhábdōi dé tis hoîa katà mélos démas donētheís,
harmogḕn mélei sunergòn epekáloun kharáttein

– – u u | – u u u u | –   u – u | – –
– u – u | – u –   u | u u u – u | – –

"And like one who is tapped (or who taps himself) on the body with a stick in time with a melody,
I called upon Harmony as an accomplice in the song to help me to inscribe it."

The second of these lines is unusual in having a trochaic rhythm in all the first three metra.

After this poem there are a further six lines, the first line sotadean, the rest dactylic, describing the theophany of the god Mandoulis.

=== Moschion ===
Also from Egypt, from Xois in the Delta, is the pillar or stele set up by a certain Moschion to the god Osiris for curing his foot (2nd century AD). This contains six texts in Greek and three in demotic Egyptian. Two of the Greek texts are in the sotadean metre. One of these is an -line sotadean poem supposedly addressed by the pillar itself to passers-by. The first two lines are entirely ionic, but then after that trochaic metra are also used. (One line, the 7th, is entirely trochaic.) Apart from the varied placing of trochaic metra, and the occasional resolutions, the metre is regular, with six morae in each metron. It begins:

τί με τὴν ἀΰπνοις φροντίσιν εὕδουσαν ἐγείρων
σκύλλεις, ἀνερευνᾶν ἐθέλων, ὡς περίεργον
κοὐχ ἁπλῆν ἔχουσαν κανόνων εὔθετον ὄψιν;

tí me tḕn aǘpnois phrontísin heúdousan egeírōn
skúlleis, anereunân ethélōn, hōs períergon
koukh haplên ékhousan kanónōn eútheton ópsin?

uu – u u | – – u u | – – u u | – –
–  – u u | – – u u | – – u u | – –
–  u – u | – – u u | – – u u | – –

"Why, waking me as I sleep with dreamless thoughts,
do you annoy me, wishing me to interpret, since I am carefully wrought
and do not have the simple, regular appearance of standard stelae?"

There is a second sotadean poem on the pillar, of nine lines, of which the initial letters form the acrostic ΜΟΣΧΙΩΝΟΣ "of Moschion". The metre is also regular.

=== Lucian ===
The satirist Lucian (2nd century AD), among other works, wrote a short mock-tragic drama of 334 lines about Gout, called Podagra. The speeches of various characters (a gouty man, the goddess Podagra, a messenger, and two hapless doctors) in iambic trimeters are interspersed with choral songs in various metres. Among these songs is a 12-line poem in sotadeans, in which the chorus describe their manner of worshipping the goddess Gout (Podagra).

Οὐχ αἷμα λάβρον προχέομεν ἀποτομαῖς σιδάρου,
οὐ τριχὸς ἀφέτον λυγίζεται στροφαῖσιν αὐχήν,
οὐδὲ πολυκρότοις ἀστραγάλοις πέπληγε νῶτα,
οὐδ᾿ ὠμὰ λακιστῶν κρέα σιτούμεθα ταύρων·

ὅτε δὲ πτελέας ἔαρι βρύει τὸ λεπτὸν ἄνθος
καὶ πολυκέλαδος κόσσυφος ἐπὶ κλάδοισιν ᾄδει,
τότε διὰ μελέων ὀξὺ βέλος πέπηγε μύσταις,
ἀφανές, κρύφιον, δεδυκὸς ὑπὸ μυχοῖσι γυίων,

πόδα, γόνυ, κοτύλην, ἀστραγάλους, ἰσχία, μηρούς,
χέρας, ὠμοπλάτας, βραχίονας, κόρωνα, καρποὺς
ἔσθει, νέμεται, φλέγει, κρατεῖ, πυροῖ, μαλάσσει,
μέχρις ἂν ἡ θεὸς τὸν πόνον ἀποφυγεῖν κελεύσῃ.

Oukh haîma lábron prokhéomen apotomaîs sidárou,
ou trikhòs aphéton lugízetai strophaîsin aukhḗn,
oudè polukrótois astragálois péplēge nôta,
oud᾿ ōmà lakistôn kréa sitoúmetha taúrōn;

hóte dè pteléas éari brúei tò leptòn ánthos
kaì polukélados kóssuphos epì kládoisin ā́idei,
tóte dià meléōn oxù bélos pépēge mústais,
aphanés, krúphion, dedukòs hupò mukhoîsi guíōn,

póda, gónu, kotúlēn, astragálous, iskhía, mēroús,
khéras, ōmoplátas, brakhíonas, kórōna, karpoùs
ésthei, németai, phlégei, krateî, puroî, malássei,
mékhris àn hē theòs tòn pónon apophugeîn keleúsēi.

–   –   u u | –, u u u u | u u  u – u | – –
–   u u u u | –, u   – u | –,   u – u | – –
–   u u u u | –, –   u u | –,   u – u | – –
–   –   u u | –  –,  u u | –    – u u | – – (ionic)

u u –   u u | –, u u u u | –,   u – u | – –
–   u u u u | –, –   u u | u u, u – u | – –
u u u u u u | –, –   u u | –,   u – u | – –
u u –   u u | –, u   – u | u u, u – u | – –

u u u u u u | –, –   u u | –,   – u u | – – (ionic)
u u –   u u | –, u   – u | –,   u – u | – –
–   –   u u | –, u   – u | –,   u – u | – –
u u u   – u | –, –   u u | u u  u – u | – –

"We do not shed our impetuous blood with cuts of steel,
no strands of hair are bent round our neck in curls,
nor are our backs struck with rattling whips of bones
nor do we feed on the raw meat of torn-up bulls;

but when the delicate flower of the elm-tree swells in spring,
and a melodious blackbird sings on its branches,
then a sharp weapon pierces the devotees' limbs,
invisible, hidden, sinking into the innermost part of their joints,

foot, knee, hip-socket, ankles, hips, thighs,
hands, shoulder-blades, arms, elbow, wrists,
it eats, devours, burns, overpowers, inflames and softens,
until such time as the goddess orders the pain to flee."

The metre has a lot of resolutions, two pure ionic lines, and some trochaic rhythms in the 1st or 2nd metra. But otherwise it is fairly strict with exactly 6 morae in each metron. There is a caesura after the fifth position in almost every line. Whenever a trochaic metron is used, it is always in the third metron.

=== Arius's Thalia ===
The heretical theologian Arius wrote a theological work called Thalia (Θαλεία, "Bountiful", the name of one of the Muses) about 320 AD. This work has not survived, but the first seven lines of it were quoted by Athanasius in his First Oration Against the Arians written about 340 AD, and twenty years later another 42 lines in his de Synodis. Athanasius characterises the work as effeminate and lax, and criticises it for imitating the ethos and song of the Egyptian Sotades. The church historian Socrates of Constantinople also described it as being "similar to sotadean songs".

The metre of the fragments has been much discussed, but Martin West classifies them as a kind of ionic metre similar to sotadean. However, it is a different type of sotadean from other examples quoted in this article, with three long syllables in the last metron instead of two. The other metra sometimes have an extra short syllable, making them iambic (– – u –) or trochaic (– u – –). The ionicus a maiore rhythm (– – u u) is almost entirely absent while the ionicus a minore (u u – –) is more common. In the last three lines there are four examples of anaclasis, sometimes crossing metron boundaries.

The first seven lines are shown below. To fit the metre, West scans διὰ as one syllable, and περικλυτός with a long sigma. He also adds the words τε and πάντα and an iota in θε<ι>οδιδάκτων.

In this seven-line extract, an accent (which by this period was a stress accent) is placed on the penultimate syllable of every line; this is also true of some, but not all, of the remaining fragments collected by West. The practice of placing an accent on the penultimate syllable of a line became common in various types of Greek poetry from the 2nd century AD onwards.

κατὰ πίστιν ἐκλέκτων θεοῦ συνετῶν <τε> θεοῦ παίδων
ἁγίων ὀρθοτόμων, ἅγιον θεοῦ πνεῦμα λαβόντων,
τάδε <πάντ᾽> ἔμαθον ἔγωγ᾽ ὑπὸ τῶν σοφίης μετεχόντων,
ἀστείων, θε<ι>οδιδάκτων κατὰ πάντα σοφῶν τε
τούτων κατ' ἴχνος ἦλθον ἐγὼ βαίνων ὁμοδόξως
ὁ περικλυτός, ὁ πολλὰ παθὼν διὰ τὴν θεοῦ δόξαν,
ὑπὸ θεοῦ μαθὼν σοφίαν, καὶ γνῶσιν ἐγὼ ἔγνων.

katà pístin ekléktōn theoû sunetôn te theoû paídōn
hagíōn orthotómōn, hágion theoû pneûma labóntōn,
táde pánt᾽ émathon égōg᾽ hupò tôn sophíēs metekhóntōn,
asteíōn, theiodidáktōn katà pánta sophôn te
toútōn kat' íkhnos êlthon egṑ baínōn homodóxōs
ho periklutóss, ho pollà pathṑn dià tḕn theoû dóxan,
hupò theoû mathṑn sophían, kaì gnôsin egṑ égnōn.

 uu – u – | –  – u – | uu – uu | –  – –
 uu – –   | uu –  uu | – u – – | uu – –
 uu – uu  | uu –  uu | – uu –  | uu – –
 –  – –   | –  uu –  | – uu –  | uu – –
 –  – u   | – u – uu | –  –  – | uu – –
 uu – u   | – u – uu | – u – u | –  – –
 uu u – u | –  uu  – | –  – uu | –  – –

"From men chosen by God according to their faith, intelligent children of God,
holy right-judging men, who have received God's holy spirit,
I learnt (all) these things, from those who partake of wisdom,
astute men, divinely taught in everything, and wise;
I followed in the footsteps of these men, sharing in their beliefs,
I, the famous, I who have suffered much for the glory of God,
having learnt wisdom from God, I also have obtained gnosis."

== Latin examples ==
=== Ennius ===
The first poet to use the sotadean metre in Latin was Ennius, who wrote a work in this metre called Sota (from Σωτᾶς, a short form of Σωτάδης). This is thought to have been a translation of a poem by Sotades himself. Three complete lines and two part-lines have survived, mainly quoted by grammarians to illustrate unusual words.

ill(e) ictu(s) retrō reccidit in natem supīnus

– – u u | –, – u u | – u – u | – –

"He, knocked backwards, fell on his bum, flat on his back"

The following has the trochaic rhythm in both the 2nd and 3rd metra:

ībant malacī viēre Veneriam corōllam

– – u u | –, u – u | u u u – u | – –

"Some soft (i.e, homosexual) men were going to weave a garland of Venus"

The following has the trochaic rhythm in 1st and 3rd metra, while the 2nd has three long syllables:

alius in marī vult magnō tenēre tōnsam

u u u – u | –, – – | – u – u | – – 

"Another wishes to hold an oar in the great sea."

Compared with some other poets, these lines seem quite regular. They exhibit anaclasis of the 1st and 2nd metron, resolution (uu for –), and contraction (– for uu). The slightly salacious tone for which Sotades was famous is illustrated in the first two lines above.

=== Plautus ===
The following five lines are found in Plautus's Amphitruo. They form part of a song in which the slave Sosia grumbles about the work he is being given to do by his master Amphitruo. The text and translation of the third line are not certain, however.

noctēsque diēsqu(e) assiduō satis superque (e)st
quod fact(ō) aut dict(ō) adest opus, quiētu(s) nē sīs.
ipse dominu(s) dīves(s) operis et labōris expers,
quodcumqu(e) homin(ī) accidit lubēre, posse rētur:
aequ(om) esse putāt, nōn reputāt labōri(s) quid sīt.

– –   u u | –, – u u   | – u – u | – –
– –   –   | –, u – u   | – u – u | – –
– u u u u | –  – u u u | – u – u | – –
– –   u u | –  u – u   | – u – u | – –
– –   u u | –, – u u   | – u – u | – –

"Nights and days continuously is enough and more than enough.
Whatever needs to be done or said, you can't stay quiet.
The rich master himself, who has no experience of work or toil,
whatever happens to take a man's fancy, he thinks it possible;
He reckons it's fair, and is not concerned what hard work it is!"

In Plautus the word dīves was pronounced dīvess, making the second metron of line 3 of seven morae. For this reason some editors delete et. However, this is not necessary if it is assumed that Plautus is following the same rules as Accius does, allowing for the metron – – – u.

The metre of 168–172 was first recognised as sotadean by Richard Bentley. No other lines in this metre are found in Plautus's 20 plays. The question arises why Plautus used the metre only here. According to Tom Sapsford, in the use of the metre there may be an implication that among the work Sosia was expected to do at night was servicing his master in the bedroom.

=== Accius ===
Another early Latin poet who wrote sotadean verses, a few years after Plautus, was Lucius Accius, but on a more serious subject. The fragments of his work Didascalica, which discusses the history of Greek and Latin poetry, seem all to be in this metre.

The style of the metre as written by Accius is of the less strict kind. For example, he sometimes allows – u – – and – – – u to stand in place of – u – u. In such metra, a long syllable, provided it was unaccented, could be used in place of a short syllable, a similar rule to that found Plautus and Terence's iambic senarii.

nam quam varia sint genera poēmatōrum, Baebī,
quamqu(e) longē distīnct(a) ali(a) ab aliīs, sīs, nōsce.

– – u u u, | – u u u u | –   u – –, | – –
– u – –,   | – –   u u,| u u u – –, | – –

"For, if you please, learn how various are the types of poems, Baebius,
and how far distinct they are one from another."

Another example from the same work, quoted by Nonius for its rare word redhostio "I pay back, recompense", is the following:

ut dum brevitātem velĭnt cōnsequī verbōrum
aliter ac sīt rellātum redhostiant respōnsum.

–   – u u | – – u u | – u – – | – –
u u u – – | – – – u | – u – – | – –

"so that while they aim to achieve brevity of words,
they return a response differently from the way it was told to them"

Another extract from Accius's work on poetic history, quoted by Aulus Gellius, discusses which plays of Plautus are authentic:

nam nec Geminei Leōnēs nec Condalium nec
Plaut(ī) Anus nec Bis Compressa nec Boeōti(a) umquam
fūit, nequ(e) ade(ō) Agroecus neque Commorientēs
Maccī Titī.

– –   u u | – u – –, | –   – u u | – –
– u u –   | – – – u, | –   u – u | – –
– –   u u | u u – –, | u u – u u | – –
– –   u – |

"For neither were the Twin Lions, nor the Ring, nor
the Old Woman nor the Twice Raped nor the Boeotian Girl ever Plautus's,
nor were even the Country Man or the Dying Together
Maccus Titus's."

In these verses Accius favours a caesura at the end of the second metron, and sometimes also at the end of the first.

=== Varro ===
Varro, a contemporary of Cicero, is also said to have written sotadeans. The following lines are quoted by the grammarian Nonius:

mūgit bōs, ovis bālat, equ(ī) hinniunt, gallīnae
pīpat pullu', gannit canis, et rudunt asellī
grunnit tepidō lacte satur molā mactātus
porcus

– – –,   | u u – u u, | –  u – – | – –
– – – u, | –   – u u, | –  u – u | – –
– – u u  | –,  – u u  | –, u – – | – –
– –

"A cow moos, a sheep bleats, horses whinny, a hen's
chick cheeps, a dog barks, and donkeys bray;
sated with warm milk, sacrificed with flour-meal,
a piglet grunts."

The substitution of – u – – and – – – u for – u – u is the same as that found in Accius's version of the sotadean. In the first two lines the caesuras come at the end of the 1st and 2nd metron, but the 3rd line is regular.

=== Petronius ===
The metre next occurs in two short poems in Petronius's novel the Satyricon. The first consists of the following four lines, spoken at a night-time orgy by a cinaedus (camp homosexual) prior to his attempting to make a sexual assault on the narrator Encolpius:

hūc hūc <cito> convenīte nunc, spatalocinaedī,
pede tendite, curs(um) addite, convolāte plantā,
femor(e) <ō> facilī, clūn(e) agilī, manū procācēs,
mollēs, veterēs, Dēliacī manū recīsī.

–   – u u | –  u – u | –, u uu u | – –
u u – u u | –, – u u | –  u –  u | – –
u u – u u | –, – u u | –, u –  u | – –
–   – u u | –, – u u | –, u –  u | – –

"This way, this way, quickly, come together now, you wanton queers,
run quickly, add to your speed, fly with your feet!
You with supple thighs, waggling buttocks, shameless hands,
old queens, castrated by a Delian's hand!"

In another poem later in the novel, the narrator, Encolpius, who has been rendered impotent, tries but fails to emasculate himself:

ter corripuī terribilem manū bipennem;
ter languidior cōliculī repente thyrsō
ferrum tremuit, quod trepidō male dabat ūsum.
nec iam poteram, quod modo cōnficere libēbat;
namqu(e) illa metū frīgidior rigente brūmā
cōnfūgerat in viscera mīll(e) operta rūgīs.
ita nōn potuī suppliciō caput aperīre,
sed furciferae mortiferō timōre lūsus
ad verba, magis quae poterant nocēre, fūgī.

–   – u u | –, – u u | –, u –   u | – –
–   – u u | –, – u u | –, u –   u | – –
–   – u u | –, – u u | –, u u u u | – –
–   – u u | –, – u u | –  u u u u | – –
–   – u u | –, – u u | –, u –   u | – –
–   – u u | –, – u u | –, u –   u | – –
u u – u u | –, – u u | –, u u u u | – –
–   – u u | –, – u u | –, u –   u | – –
–   – u u | –, – u u | –, u –   u | – –

'Three times I seized the terrifying two-edged (dagger) in my hand;
three times, suddenly softer than a cabbage stalk,
(my penis) took fright at the steel, which since I was trembling, was hard to control;
and now I was no longer able to do what I had been wanting to accomplish;
for she (i.e. my penis), from fear colder than the freezing midwinter,
had fled for refuge into my bowels, hidden in a thousand folds,
and so I did not manage to uncover her head for execution;
but, tricked by deadly fear of that criminal,
I took refuge in words, which were able to harm her more.'

The metre is much more regular than in Accius and Varro, and apart from the occasional resolution, every line is the same with anaclasis only in the 3rd metron. There is a regular caesura after the 5th syllable and also after the 9th in almost every line (in every line if the prefix con- is counted as a separate word).

In the opening lines Petronius parodies the tragic style of Virgil's Aeneid: for ter ... ter compare Aeneid 2.792–3, 6.700–2; for corripui bipennem compare Aeneid 2.479, 11.651; for trepido male compare Aeneid 2.753.

=== The gladiator ===
Of uncertain date is a line quoted by Festus, supposedly said by a retiarius, a kind of gladiator armed with a net and trident, who was set to fight a Gallus (Gaul) or murmillo, a kind of gladiator armed like a Gaul with sword and shield, who had an image of a fish on his helmet.

nōn tē peto, piscem peto, quid mē fugis, Galle?

– – u u, | – – u u, | – – u x | – –

'It's not you I'm aiming for, it's the fish; why are you running away from me, Gaul?'

If fugis is scanned u u (although this is not certain), the sotadean is the purely ionic type. The caesuras also come at the end of each metron, unlike the style used by Petronius.

=== Martial ===
The following couplet is the only example found in Martial's ten books of epigrams. The joke is that Zoilus was once a slave, but now wears the ring of a Roman knight. Both lines have the same rhythm:

hās cum geminā compede dēdicat catēnās,
Sāturne, tibī Zōilus, ānulōs priōrēs.

– – u u | –, – u u, | – u – u | – –
– – u u | –, – u u, | – u – u | – –

"These chains with their twin fetters Zoilus dedicates
to you, Saturn, his rings of earlier days."

Although Martial generally refused to write in the sotadean metre, here he uses it speaking on Zoilus's behalf. Elsewhere (3.82) he lampoons Zoilus as very effeminate.

=== Terentianus ===
The 2nd-century grammarian Terentianus Maurus, in his work De litteris, de syllabis, de metris writes the whole section on letters of the alphabet (lines 85–278) in sotadeans. These sotadeans, however, are very different from those of earlier authors in their subject matter. They also differ metrically, and are much simpler. Some lines are pure ionic, and if a trochaic rhythm is used it is always in the third metron. The section begins as follows:

Elementa, rudēs quae puerōs docent magistrī,
vōcālia quaedam memorant, cōnsona quaedam;
haec reddere vōcem quoniam valent seorsa,
nūllumque sin(e) illīs potis est coīre verbum:
at cōnsona quae sunt, nisi vōcālibus aptēs,
pars dīmidium vōcis opus prōferet ex sē,
pars mūta sonī comprimet ōra mōlientum.

uu – u u | –, – u u | –, u – u | – –
–  – u u | – –, u u | –, – u u | – – 
–  – u u | – –, u u | –, u – u | – –
–  – u u | – –, u u | –, u – u | – –
–  – u u | – –, u u | –  – u u | – –
–  – u u | –, – u u | –, – u u | – –
–  – u u | –, – u u | –  u – u | – –

"The elements, which schoolmasters teach young boys,
some of them they call vowels, others consonants,
since the former can produce a sound by themselves,
and no word can be made without them;
but the ones which are consonants, unless you join them to vowels,
some of them will produce a half-sound from themselves,
while others are completely silent and will block the mouths of those trying to pronounce them."

== Persian parallels ==
The ionic metre was particularly associated with Persia; for example, the opening chorus of Aeschylus's Persians was in this metre. The metre re-emerges in Persian poetry of the 10th century and later. The author of The Persian Metres, L. P. Elwell-Sutton, conjectured that there may have been a continuous tradition of this rhythm in Persian music from ancient times; although evidence for this is lacking.

No exact equivalent of the sotadean metre is found in Persian. The following metre, however, is the same as the lines in pure Ionic metre above. The example comes from the 11th-century poet Manuchehri:

khīzīd o khaz ārīd, ke hengām-e khazān ast
– – | u u – – | (u) u – – | u u – –
'Arise and bring fur, since it is the season of autumn'

The internal rhyme -īd ... -īd suggests division into feet as above.

The anacreontic rhythm, in which the sotadean ends, also occurs in Persian poetry, for example in the following example from Saadi.

man agar nazar harām ast * bas-ī gonāh dāram
u u – u – u – – || (u) u – u – (u) – –
"If looking is forbidden, I have plenty of sin"

Most Persian poems use a single metre throughout, without mixing pure and anaclastic forms, but one type of poetry, the ruba'i or quatrain, mixes two metres at random:

– | – u u – | – u u – | – u u –
– | – u u – | u – u – | – u u –

The first type is like the simple pure ionic type of sotadean, except that it is one syllable shorter. The second line has anaclasis of the same type as in the sotadean, but in the second metron rather than the third.
