= Ionic meter =

Meter used in Greek, Latin, and Persian poetry

The ionic (or Ionic) is a four-syllable metrical unit (metron) of light-light-heavy-heavy (u u – –) that occurs in ancient Greek and Latin poetry. According to Hephaestion it was known as the Ionicos because it was used by the Ionians of Asia Minor; and it was also known as the Persicos and was associated with Persian poetry. Like the choriamb, in Greek quantitative verse the ionic never appears in passages meant to be spoken rather than sung. "Ionics" may refer inclusively to poetry composed of the various metrical units of the same total quantitative length (six morae) that may be used in combination with ionics proper: ionics, choriambs, and anaclasis. Equivalent forms exist in English poetry and in classical Persian poetry.

== Examples of ionics ==
Pure examples of Ionic metrical structures occur in verse by Alcman (frg. 46 PMG = 34 D), Sappho (frg. 134-135 LP), Alcaeus (frg. 10B LP), Anacreon, and the Greek dramatists, including the first choral song of Aeschylus' Persians and in Euripides' Bacchae. Like dochmiacs, the ionic meter is characteristically experienced as expressing excitability. The form has been linked tentatively with the worship of Cybele and Dionysus.

The opening chorus of Euripides' Bacchae begins as follows, in a mixture of anapaests (u u –) and ionic feet (u u – –):

Ἀσίας ἀπὸ γᾶς
ἱερὸν Τμῶλον ἀμείψασα θοάζω
Βρομίῳ πόνον ἡδὺν
κάματόν τʼ εὐκάματον, Βάκ-
χιον εὐαζομένα.

Asías apò gâs
hieròn Tmôlon ameípsasa thoázō
Bromíōi pónon hēdùn
kámatón tʼ eukámaton, Bák-
khion euazoména.

u u – | u u –
u u – – | u u – – | u u – –
u u – | u u – –
u u – – | u u – –
u u – – | u u –

"From the land of Asia
having left sacred Tmolus, I am swift
to perform for Bromius my sweet labor
and toil easily borne,
celebrating the god Bacchus."

== Latin poetry ==
An example of pure ionics in Latin poetry is found as a "metrical experiment" in the Odes of Horace, Book 3, poem 12, which draws on Archilochus and Sappho for its content and utilizes a metrical line that appears in a fragment of Alcaeus. The Horace poem begins as follows:

miserārum (e)st nequ(e) amōrī dare lūdum neque dulcī
mala vīnō laver(e) aut exanimārī
metuentis patruae verbera linguae.

u u – – | u u – – | u u – – | u u – –
u u – – | u u – – | u u – –
u u – – | u u – – | u u – –

"Those girls are wretched who do not play with love or use sweet
wine to wash away their sorrows, or who are terrified,
fearing the blows of an uncle's tongue."

In writing this 4-verse poem Horace tends to place a caesura (word-break) after every metrical foot, except occasionally in the last two feet of the line.

== Anacreontics ==
The anacreontic | u u – u – u – – | is sometimes analyzed as a form of ionics which has undergone anaclasis (substitution of u – for – u in the 4th and 5th positions). The galliambic is a variation of this, with resolution (substitution of u u for – ) and catalexis (omission of the final syllable) in the second half. Catullus used galliambic meter for his Carmen 63 on the mythological figure Attis, a portion of which is spoken in the person of Cybele. The poem begins:

super alta vectus Attis celerī rate maria
Phrygi(um) ut nemus citātō cupidē pede tetigit
adiitqu(e) opāca silvīs redimīta loca deae,
stimulātus ibi furenti rabiē, vagus animīs
dēvolsit īl(i) acūtō sibi pondera silice.

The meter is:

u u – u – u – – | u u – u u u u –
u u – u – u – – | u u – u u u u –
u u – u – u – – | u u – u u u u –
u u – u u u u – – | u u – u u u u –
– – u – u – – | u u – u u u u –

"Attis, having crossed the high seas in a swift ship,
as soon as he eagerly touched the Phrygian forest with swift foot
and approached the shady places, surrounded by woods, of the goddess,
excited there by raging madness, losing his mind,
he tore off the weights of his groin with a sharp flint."

In this poem Catullus leaves a caesura (word-break) at the mid-point of every line. Occasionally the 5th syllable is resolved into two shorts (as in line 4 above) or the first two shorts are replaced with a single long syllable (as in line 5, if the text is sound).

== Ionicus a minore and a maiore ==
The "ionic" almost invariably refers to the basic metron u u — —, but this metron is also known by the fuller name ionicus a minore in distinction to the less commonly used ionicus a maiore (— — u u). Some modern metricians generally consider the term ionicus a maiore to be of little analytic use, a vestige of Hephaestion's "misunderstanding of metre" and desire to balance metrical units with their mirror images.

== Polyschematist sequences ==
The Ionic and Aeolic meters are closely related, as evidenced by the polyschematist unit x x — x — u u — (with x representing an anceps position that may be heavy or light).

The sotadeion or sotadean, named after the Hellenistic poet Sotades, has been classified as ionic a maiore by Hephaestion and by M. L. West:

– – u u | – – u u | – u – u | – –

It "enjoyed a considerable vogue for several centuries, being associated with low-class entertainment, especially of a salacious sort, though also used for moralizing and other serious verse." Among those poets who used it were Ennius, Accius and Petronius.

== In English ==
In English poetry, Edward Fitzgerald composed in a combination of anacreontics and ionics. An example of English ionics occurs in lines 4 and 5 of the following lyric stanza by Thomas Hardy:

The pair seemed lovers, yet absorbed
In mental scenes no longer orbed
By love's young rays. Each countenance

Às ìt slówlý, às ìt sádlý
Caùght thè lámplíght's yèllòw glánce,

Held in suspense a misery
At things which had been or might be.

Compare W. B. Yeats, "And the white breast of the dim sea" ("Who will go drive with Fergus now?" from The Countess Cathleen) and Tennyson, "In Memoriam," "When the blood creeps and the nerves prick" (compare pyrrhic).

== Persian poetry ==
The ionic rhythm is common in classical Persian poetry and exists in both trimeter and tetrameter versions. Nearly 10% of lyric poems are written in the following meter:

x u – – | u u – – | u u – – | u u –

In the Persian version, the first syllable is anceps and the two short syllables in the last foot are biceps, that is, they may be replaced by one long syllable. An example by the 13th-century poet Saadi is the following:

abr o bād ō mah o xorshīd o falak dar kār-and
tā to nān-ī be kaf ārī-yo be qeflat na-xorī
"Cloud and wind and moon and sun and firmament are at work
so that you may get some bread in your hand and not eat it neglectfully."

The acatalectic tetrameter is less common, but is also found:

x u – – | u u – – | u u – – | u u – –

Another version, used in a famous poem by the 11th-century poet Manuchehri, is the same as this but lacks the first two syllables:

xīzīd-o xaz ārīd ke hengām-e xazān ast
bād-e xonok 'az jāneb-e Xārazm vazān ast

– – | u u – – | u u – – | u u – –

Get up and bring fur as it is the season of autumn
A cold wind is blowing from the direction of Khwarazm

The two underlined syllables are extra-long, and take the place of a long + short syllable (– u).

Anaclastic versions of the meter also exist, resembling the Greek anacreontic, for example:

u u – u – u – – | u u – u – u – –

From its name persicos it appears that this meter was associated with the Persians even in early times. It was used for example by Aeschylus in the opening chorus of his play The Persians, which is sung by a group of old men in the Persian capital city of Susa.

== Turkish poetry ==
The Persian meter was imitated in Turkish poetry during the Ottoman period. The Turkish National Anthem or İstiklal Marşı, written in 1921 by Mehmet Akif Ersoy, is in this meter:

Korkma! sönmez bu şafaklarda yüzen al sancak
x u – – | u u – – | u u – – | u u –
"Fear not! for the crimson banner that proudly ripples in this glorious dawn shall not fade"

However, neither of the two tunes written for the anthem in 1924 and 1930 follows the rhythm of the meter.
