= Anaclastic =

Anaclastic may refer to:

- Anaclastic lens
- Anaclasis (poetry)
