= Galliambic verse =

Poetic metre used in Catullus's poem 63

Versus Galliambicus (Latin), or the Galliambic Verse (English), is a verse built from two anacreontic cola, the second one catalectic (i.e., lacking its final syllable). The metre typically has resolution in the last metron, and often elsewhere, leading to a run of short syllables at the end. An example is the first line of Catullus's poem 63:

 u u  -  u  | -  u  -  -  ||  u u -  u u | u u u
sŭpĕr āltă   vēctŭs Āttĭs || cĕlĕrī rătĕ   mărĭă

This metre was used for songs sung by galli (or gallae), eunuch devotees of the goddess Cybele, the ancient nature goddess of Anatolia, who was also known as the Mother of the Gods.

The most famous poem in this metre is Catullus's Attis (poem 63), a poem of 93 lines describing the self-emasculation of a certain Attis, who later regretted his action, but was driven again to a frenzy by the goddess. Apart from this poem only a few isolated lines in the metre exist in Greek and Latin.

== Construction ==
The galliambic metre in its most basic form (as shown in the first of the two Greek lines quoted below) consists of a catalectic ionic tetrameter:

u u – – | u u – – || u u – – | u u –

However, especially as used by Latin writers, the lines usually show anaclasis (syncopation), i.e. the reversal of the 4th and 5th element in each half, almost always in the first half and usually also in the second. Thus in five lines of Catullus 63 (lines 14, 35, 73, 76, 91) where the 13th element is long there is anaclasis in both halves:

u u – u | uu u – – || u u uu u | – u –

But in most lines (in fact in 88 out of the 93 lines of Catullus 63) the 13th element is resolved into two short syllables, leading to a run of short syllables at the end of the verse. When this happens it is unclear whether anaclasis has taken place in the second half or not; the word accents suggest that there is often no anaclasis in the second half, but this is uncertain.

u u – u | – u – – || u u – u u u u x

Sometimes other elements are resolved as well; and occasionally there is also contraction of two short elements into one long syllable. Thus the complete scheme is as follows:

uu uu u | uu u – – || uu uu u | uu u ×

- "x" represents an anceps or brevis in longo
- a "u" represents a short syllable
- a "—" represents a long syllable
- a "uu" can be either 2 short syllables or 1 long syllable
- the "||" represents the caesura of the verse
- "()" represents a synaloepha or elision

== Ancient Greek ==
Only two lines of galliambic poetry have survived from ancient Greek, quoted by the metrical writer Hephaestion. The first line is pure ionic, without anaclasis. The second line has anaclasis (according to Hephaestion), but of a different type to that used by Catullus:

Γαλλαὶ, μητρὸς ὀρείης φιλόθυρσοι δρομάδες,
αἷς ἔντεα παταγεῖται καὶ χάλκεα κρόταλα

 –  –    –  u  u – –  ||   u u  –  –   u  u –
Gallaì, mētròs oreíēs || philóthursoi dromádes,

  –  –  uu  u u –  –  ||  –    –  uu   u u u
haîs éntea patageîtai || kaì khálkea krótala

"Gallae, thyrsus-loving runners of the Mountain Mother,
whose instruments and bronze castanets are clattering."

== Catullus 63 ==
The Galliambic Verse is found in Catullus 63:

 u u  -  u  -  u  -  -  ||  u u -  u u u u u
sŭpĕr āltă vēctŭs Āttĭs || cĕlĕrī rătĕ mărĭă 
 u   u     -  u  -   u - - || u u  -  u u  u u u
Phrygĭ(um) ŭt nĕmŭs cĭtātō || cŭpĭdē pĕdĕ tĕtĭgĭt 

- Catullus 63, lines 1-2

"Attis, after being carried across the deep seas in a swift ship,
as soon as he eagerly touched the Phrygian forest with hastening foot..."

Varro and Maecenas also wrote Latin poems in Galliambic verse, of which only fragments survive.

=== Variations ===
As the Galliambic meter admits substitutions of two short syllables for a long one, there are variations on how this verse is structured on different sentences.

==== this is one type of variation of the Galliambic verse ====
 u u  - u  u u  u -  - ||  u u-   u u  u u -
stĭmŭlātŭs ĭbĭ fŭrentī || răbĭē, văgŭs ănĭmīs,

-Catullus 63, Line 4

"stimulated by raging madness, vague in his mind..."

==== this is another type variation of the Galliambic verse ====
u u  u u u   u     u u -  -  || u     u  - u   u u  uu
ĕgŏ mŭlĭĕr, ĕg(o) ădŏlēscēns,|| ĕg(o) ĕphēbŭs, ĕgŏ pŭĕr 

- Catullus 63, Line 63

"I am a woman, I am an adolescent, I am a youth, I am a boy"

==== this is another type of variation of the Galliambic verse ====
u u  u u u  - u      - - ||  u     u -  u  u u  u u
ĕgŏ vĭrĭdĭs ălgĭ(da) Īdǣ || nĕv(e) ămĭctă lŏcă cŏlăm.

- Catullus 63, Line 70

"I shall dwell in the cold places, clothed in snow, of green Ida"

==== this is another type of variation of the Galliambic verse ====
Occasionally, however, there is no resolution, and there can be contraction of the first two short syllables in each half:

 –   –   u –    u  – – ||  –   –  u   –  u –
iam iam dolet quod ēgī || iam iamque paenitet.

- Catullus 63, Line 73

"Now I am sorry for what I have done, now, now I repent"

== Modern use ==
Alfred, Lord Tennyson imitated the Galliambic metre for his poem, Boadicea. It begins as follows:

While about the shore of Mona those Neronian legionaries
Burnt and broke the grove and altar of the Druid and Druidess,

Although Catullus 63 is not typically translated directly into Galliambics, as they present more of a challenge in English, Peter Green did so for his 2005 edition of the complete poems of Catullus.
