= Vedic metre =

Indian poetic metre

Vedic metre refers to the poetic metre in the Vedic literature. The study of Vedic metre, along with post-Vedic metre, is part of Chandas, one of the six Vedanga disciplines.

== Overview ==
The seven major Vedic metres
Metre	Syllable structure	No. of verses	Examples
Gāyatrī	8 8 8	2447	Rigveda 7.1.1-30, 8.2.14
Uṣṇih	8 8 12	341	Rigveda 1.8.23-26
Anuṣṭubh	8 8 8 8	855	Rigveda 8.69.7-16, 10.136.7
Bṛhatī	8 8 12 8	181	Rigveda 5.1.36, 3.9.1-8
Pankti	8 8 8 8 + 8	312	Rigveda 1.80–82.
Triṣṭubh	11 11 11 11	4253	Rigveda 4.50.4, 7.3.1-12
Jagatī	12 12 12 12	1318	Rigveda 1.51.13, 9.110.4-12

In addition to these seven, there are fourteen less frequent syllable-based metres (Varna-vritta or Akshara-chandas):

8. Atijagati (13x4); 9. Śakkarī (14x4); 10. Atiśakarī (15x4); 11. Ashṭi (16x4);
12. Atyashti (17x4); 13. Dhritī (18x4); 14. Atidhritī (19x4); 15. Kṛiti (20x4);
16. Prakṛiti (21x4); 17. Ākṛiti (22x4): 18. Vikṛiti (23x4); 19. Śankṛiti (24x4);
20. Atikṛiti (25x4); 21. Utkṛiti (26x4).

Note: all metres have several varieties (from 2 to 30 depending on the case).

There is also the metre called Dandaka which is the general name given to other metres of this class exceeding the measure (26x4) of Utkriti (Dandaka is the No. 22 on the list compiled by H.H. Wilson).

There are several other minor metres found in the Vedas, of which the following are two examples:

Virāj: 4 lines of 10 syllables.
Kakubh: 3 lines of 8, 12, 8 syllables.

== Development ==
E. V. Arnold classified the hymns of the Rigveda into four periods, partly on the grounds of language and partly of metre.

In the earliest period, which he calls "Bardic", when often the names of the individual poets are known, a variety of metres are used, including, for example, a ten-syllable version of the triṣṭubh; some poems of this period also often show an iambic rhythm (ᴗ – ᴗ –) in the second section of the triṣṭubh and jagatī metres.

The second period, the "Normal", has more regular metres.

The third period, the "Cretic", shows a preference for a cretic rhythm (– ᴗ –) in syllables 5 to 7 of the triṣṭubh and jagatī following a 4th-syllable caesura.

The last period, called "Popular", contains several hymns which also occur in the Atharvaveda collection; in this period also the anuṣṭubh tends towards the form it had in the epic period, with a trochaic cadence ( ᴗ – – x) in lines 1 and 3.

== Gāyatrī metre ==
The shortest and most sacred of Vedic metres is the Gāyatrī metre, also known as the Sāvitrī metre. A verse consists of three octosyllabic sections (pāda). The following is an example of the opening of a Rigvedic hymn in Gāyatrī metre:

Devanagari

इन्द्रमिद्गाथिनो बृहदिन्द्रमर्केभिरर्किणः इन्द्रं वाणीरनूषत ॥१॥

IAST

indram id gāthino bṛhad indram arkebhir arkiṇaḥ. indraṃ vāṇīr anūṣata.

Translation of Rigveda 1.7.1 by Frits Staal

The chanters have loudly chanted to Indra, the singers have sung their songs to Indra, the musicians have resounded to Indra.

Musical beats: / – ᴗ – – / ᴗ – ᴗ ᴗ / / – ᴗ – – / ᴗ – ᴗ – / / – – – – / ᴗ – ᴗ – /

/ DUM da DUM DUM / da DUM da da / / DUM da DUM DUM / da DUM da DUM / / DUM DUM DUM DUM / da DUM da DUM /

The Gāyatrī metre is considered as the most refined and sacred of the Vedic metres, and one that continues to be part of modern Hindu culture as part of Yoga and hymns of meditation at sunrise.

The general scheme of the Gāyatrī is a stanza of three 8-syllable lines. The length of the syllables is variable, but the rhythm tends to be iambic (ᴗ – ᴗ –), especially in the cadence (last four syllables) of each line. However, there is one rare variety, used for example in Rigveda 8.2.1–39, in which the cadence is trochaic (– ᴗ – x). Another cadence sometimes found (especially in the first line of a stanza) is (ᴗ ᴗ ᴗ x). The last syllable of a line may be long or short indifferently.

The Gāyatrī metre makes up about 25% of the entire Rigveda. The only metre more commonly used in Rigveda than Gāyatrī is the Tristubh metre. The structure of Gāyatrī and other Vedic metres is more flexible than post-Vedic metres.

One of the best known verses of Gāyatrī is the Gayatri Mantra, which is taken from book 3.62.10 (the last hymn of the 3rd book) of the Rigveda.

When the Rig-Veda is chanted, performers traditionally recite the first two padas of Gāyatrī without making a break between them, in accordance with the generally used saṃhitā text. However, according to Macdonell, "there is no reason to believe that in the original text the second verse was more sharply divided from the third than from the first." When the Gayatri Mantra is recited, on the other hand, a pause is customarily made after each pada. Note that the 3x8 syllable structure refers to the last three lines of the Gayatri Mantra (starting from tat savitur vareṇyaṃ). The first line, oṃ bhūr bhuvaḥ svaḥ, is an introduction to invoke the mantra to work on three Vyāhṛti or planes (physical, mental and spiritual).

When there is a pause, a short syllable at the end of a line can be considered long, by the principle of brevis in longo.

Although the Gāyatrī is very common in the Rigveda, it fell out of use early and is not found in Sanskrit poetry of the classical period. There is a similar 3 x 8 stanzaic metre in the Avestan scriptures of ancient Iran.

== Jagatī metre ==
The jagatī metre has lines of 12 syllables, and its overall scheme is:

/ x – x – / x ᴗ ᴗ – / ᴗ – ᴗ x /

where x = a syllable which is either long or short. Occasionally in the first half of the line, ᴗ – may be substituted for – ᴗ or vice versa.

Other authors divide the line differently. For example, E. V. Arnold divides it into three "members" as follows:

/ x – x – / x ᴗ ᴗ / – ᴗ – ᴗ x

He calls the central section the "break", since at this point the mainly iambic rhythm of the opening is broken.

The first hymn of the Rigveda to use jagatī throughout is 1.55, of which the first stanza is as follows:

Devanagari

दिवश्चिदस्य वरिमा वि पप्रथ इन्द्रं न मह्ना पृथिवी चन प्रति ।
भीमस्तुविष्माञ्चर्षणिभ्य आतपः शिशीते वज्रं तेजसे न वंसगः ॥

IAST

divaś cid asya varimā vi papratha indraṃ na mahnā pṛthivī cana prati.
bhīmas tuviṣmāñ carṣaṇibhya ātapaḥ śiśīte vajraṃ tejase na vaṃsagaḥ.

Translation of Rigveda 1.55.1 by Ralph T. H. Griffith

Though e'en this heaven's wide space and earth have spread them out, nor heaven nor earth may be in greatness Indra's match. Awful and very mighty, causing woe to men, he whets his thunderbolt for sharpness, as a bull.

Musical beats: / ᴗ – ᴗ – / ᴗ ᴗ ᴗ – / ᴗ – ᴗ ᴗ / / – – ᴗ – / – ᴗ ᴗ – / ᴗ – ᴗ ᴗ / / – – ᴗ – / – – ᴗ – / ᴗ – ᴗ – / / ᴗ – – – / – – ᴗ – / ᴗ – ᴗ – /

/ da DUM da DUM / da da da DUM / da DUM da da / / DUM DUM da DUM / DUM da da DUM / da DUM da da / / DUM DUM da DUM / DUM DUM da DUM / da DUM da DUM / / da DUM DUM DUM / DUM DUM da DUM / da DUM da DUM /

There is usually a word-break (caesura) after the fifth syllable, but sometimes after the fourth.

A recent study including nearly all the 12-syllable lines in the Rigveda showed the following percentages of long (heavy) syllables in each position in the line, confirming that the 6th position is nearly always short (light):

51%, 87%, 51%, 95%, 67%, 10%, 37%, 97%, 3%, 98%, 1%, 83%

Therefore, the statistics suggest the metre as such:- / x – x – / – ᴗ ᴗ – / ᴗ – ᴗ x /

== See also ==
- Sanskrit prosody
- Vedic accent
