= Iambic trimeter =

Meter of poetry

The Iambic trimeter, in classical Greek and Latin poetry, is a meter of poetry consisting of three iambic metra (each of two feet) per line. In English poetry, it refers to a meter with three iambic feet.

In ancient Greek poetry and Latin poetry, an iambic trimeter is a quantitative meter, in which a line consists of three iambic metra. Each metron consists of the pattern | x – u – |, where "–" represents a long syllable, "u" a short one, and "x" an anceps (either long or short). Resolution was common, especially in the first two metra of the line, so that any long or anceps syllable except the last could be replaced by two short syllables (see for example Euripides#Chronology), making a total of 13 or more syllables. It is the most common meter used for the spoken parts (as opposed to the sung parts) of Ancient Greek tragedy, comedy, and satyr plays. It is also common in iambus or 'blame poetry', although it is not the only meter for that genre.

In Latin, the iambic trimeter was adapted for the spoken parts of Roman plays, especially Roman comedy. The form used in Roman comedy is usually known as the iambic senarius. The iambic trimeter was also used in the Epodes of Horace, the fables of Phaedrus, the proverbs of Publilius Syrus, and the tragedies of Seneca the Younger.

In the accentual-syllabic verse of English, German, and other languages, however, the iambic trimeter is a meter consisting of three iambs (disyllabic units with stress on the second syllable) per line, making a line of six syllables.

== Greek ==
=== Basic form ===
The iambic trimeter derives its name from its essential shape, which is three metrical units (hence "trimeter") which are each basically iambic in form. The iambic metron has the following shape (where "x" is an anceps, which may be either long or short, "–" is a long syllable, and "u" is a short one):

| x – u – |

The trimeter repeats this structure three times, with the resulting shape as follows:

| x – u – | x – u – | x – u – |

As always, the last syllable of a verse is counted as long even if naturally short (brevis in longo).

An example of the structure:

ἥκω Διὸς παῖς τήνδε Θηβαίων χθόνα
hḗkō Diòs paîs tḗnde Thēbaíōn khthóna
| – – u – | – – u – | – – u – |
(Euripides, Bacchae 1)
'I, the son of Zeus, have come to this land of the Thebans'

=== Caesura and bridge ===
A caesura (break between words) is usually found after the fifth or seventh element of the line. In the example above, it is found after the fifth element, as so (with ¦ representing the caesura):

| x – u – | x ¦ – u – | x – u – |

Finally, Porson's Law is observed, which means here that if the anceps of the third metron is long, there cannot be a word-break after that anceps. The second anceps is free from this constraint, because a word-break at that point would be a main caesura.

=== Resolution ===
The Greek iambic trimeter allows resolution, allowing more variety. In tragedy, resolving the anceps elements is rare, except to accommodate a proper name, but resolution of the long elements is slightly more common. In comedy, which is closer to casual speech, resolution is fairly common.

In both tragedy and comedy, though, the third metron is usually left alone; resolution in the final metron of the line is rare.

In tragedy, resolutions are virtually never consecutive, and two instances in the same line are rare.

When resolution occurs, the resulting two shorts are almost always within the same word-unit.

== Latin iambic senarius ==
The iambic trimeter was imitated in Latin by 2nd century BC comic playwrights such as Plautus and Terence, where it is known as the iambic senarius. It is the most commonly used meter in their plays, especially in Terence, and it is the only meter which was used purely for dialogue without musical accompaniment. It was the preferred meter of the Roman fabulist Phaedrus in the first century AD. In Latin the basic meter was as follows:

| x – x – | x – x – | x – u – |

That is to say, the third and seventh elements, which were always short in Greek tragedy (but not in Greek comedy), were anceps (either long or short) in Latin; in fact they are long 60% of the time, while the Greek anceps syllables (the first, fifth, and ninth elements) are long in 80–90% of lines. As in the Greek trimeter, any long or anceps syllable except the last could be replaced with a double short syllable (u u). As in Greek, there was usually (though not always) a caesura (word-break) after the fifth element.

An example of a Latin iambic senarius (from the prologue to Plautus' Aulularia) is the following:

nē quís mīrétur quí sim, paúcīs éloquár.
| – – – – | – – – – | – – u – |
"In case anyone should wonder who I am, let me explain in a few words."

A difference between Latin and Greek iambics was that the Latin senarius was partly accentual, that is to say the words were arranged in such a way that very often (especially in the first half of the verse), the word accents coincided with the strong points of the line, that is the 2nd, 4th, 6th etc. elements of the verse. Thus even in lines where nearly all the syllables were long as in the above verse, it is possible to feel the iambic rhythm of the line.

Any long or anceps element except the last could be resolved into two short syllables, giving rise to lines like the following (the resolved elements are underlined):

nunc hódi(e) Amphítruō véniēt húc ab ěxércitú
| – uu – uu | – uu – – | uu – u – |
"Right now today Amphitryon will come here from the army"

The above line also illustrates another feature found in Plautus and Terence, namely iambic shortening or brevis breviāns, where the syllables ab ex- are scanned as two short syllables. The long ē in veniēt is another Plautine feature.

== Accentual-syllabic iambic trimeter ==
In English and similar accentual-syllabic metrical systems, a line of iambic trimeter consists of three iambic feet. The resulting six-syllable line is very short, and few poems are written entirely in this meter.

The 1948 poem "My Papa's Waltz" by Theodore Roethke uses the trimeter:

...We romped until the pans
Slid from the kitchen shelf;
My mother's countenance
Could not unfrown itself.

William Blake's "Song ('I Love the Jocund Dance')" (1783) uses a loose iambic trimeter that sometimes incorporates additional weak syllables:

I love the jocund dance,
The softly breathing song,
Where innocent eyes do glance,
And where lisps the maiden's tongue.

I love the laughing gale,
I love the echoing hill,
Where mirth does never fail,
And the jolly swain laughs his fill.

=== As a component of common meter ===
The English iambic trimeter is much more frequently encountered as one-half of the common meter, which consists of alternating iambic tetrameter and trimeter lines:

O God Our help in ages past
Our hope in years to come
our shelter from the stormy blast
And our eternal home

Isaac Watts, a paraphrase of Psalm 90," Our God, Our Help in Ages Past,

Another example, from the American poet Emily Dickinson:

If you were coming in the fall
I'd brush the summer by
With half a smile and half a spurn,
As housewives do a fly.

Emily Dickinson, "If You Were Coming in the Fall"
