= Anuṣṭubh =

Metre in Sanskrit poetry

Anuṣṭubh (Sanskrit: अनुष्टुभ्, IPA: [ɐnuˈʂʈubʱ]) is a metre and a metrical unit, found in both Vedic and Classical Sanskrit poetry, but with significant differences.

By origin, an anuṣṭubh stanza is a quatrain of four lines. Each line, called a pāda (lit. "foot"), has eight syllables.

== In Vedic texts ==
Arnold distinguishes three varieties of anuṣṭubh in the Vedic corpus: an early free form, with very few restrictions except a general iambic (u – u x) tendency in the cadence (vṛtta) of each of the four pādas; e.g.

ā́ yás te sar | pirāsute | – – – – | u – u – |
ágne śám ás | ti dhā́yase ‖ – – u – | u – u – ‖
áiṣu dyumnám | utá śrávah | – – – u | u – u u |
ā́ cittám már | tieṣu dhāh ‖ – – – – | u – u – ‖

Next came a mildly trochaic development in the opening of each pāda; and finally the development of the "epic anuṣṭubh" (mostly in the Atharvaveda) prefiguring the classical śloka form. Although in these hymns the iambic cadence of the first verse is still the most frequent (25%) of all varieties, it is already very nearly equaled (23%) by the normal and characteristic cadence of the first verse in the epic anuṣṭubh (śloka), where the iambic cadence in the first verse has entirely disappeared.

It has been shown that the percentage of long (or heavy) syllables in 8-syllable lines in the Rigveda as a whole in each position is as follows:

53%, 77%, 67%, 79%, 8%, 93%, 5%, 82%

Thus the first half of the line tends to be iambic, while the second half is almost always iambic. In those lines where the 2nd syllable is short, the third syllable is almost always long.

== In Classical Sanskrit: the śloka ==

In classical Sanskrit the anuṣṭubh developed into its specific epic form known as śloka, as described above, which may be considered the Indian verse par excellence, occurring, as it does, far more frequently than any other metre in classical Sanskrit poetry.

By the 5th century CE, in the poetry of Kalidasa, the śloka had the restricted form shown in the table above. Each half-verse of 16 syllables can take either a pathyā ("normal") form or one of several vipulā ("extended") forms. The pathyā and vipulā half-verses are arranged in the table above in order of frequency of occurrence. The most common is the pathyā. Out of 2579 half-verses taken from Kalidasa, Bharavi, Magha, and Bilhana, each of the four admissible forms of shloka in this order claims the following share: 2289, 116, 89, 85; that is, 89% of the half-verses have the regular pathyā form.

In earlier epic, such as the Mahabharata, a fourth vipula is found, namely:

| x x x –, | – u – x ||

Two rules that apply in every śloka are:

1. In both pādas, in syllables 2–3, u u is not allowed.
2. In the second pāda, in syllables 2–4, – u – is not allowed.

== Bibliography ==
- Arnold, E. V. Vedic metre in its historical development, Cambridge University Press, 1905
- Hopkins, E. W. The Great Epic of India, C. Scribner's Sons, New York, 1901
- MacDonald, Anne. "Revisiting the Mūlamadhyamakakārika: Text-Critical Proposals and Problems." Indotetsugaku-Bukkyōgaku-Kenkyū 14 (2007), 25-55
- Macdonell, Arthur A. (1927), A Sanskrit Grammar for Students, (Oxford University Press, 3rd edition, 1927) Appendix II.
- Macdonell, Arthur A. (1916), A Vedic Grammar for Students Appendix II, p. 438. (Oxford University Press, 1916).
- Oldenberg, Hermann (2005-01-01). Prolegomena on Metre and Textual History of the R̥gveda: Metrische und Textgeschichtliche Prolegomena, Berlin, 1888. Motilal Banarsidass Publishers. ISBN 978-81-208-0986-4.
- Steiner, Roland. "Die Lehre der Anuṣṭubh bei den indischen Metrikern." Suhṛllekāḥ, Festgabe für Helmut Eimer. (Indica et Tibetica 28). Eds. Hahn, Michael & Jens-Uwe Hartmann. Swisttal-Odendorf (1996), 227-248.

== See also ==
- Vedic metre
- Sanskrit prosody
- Shloka
