= Resolution (metre) =

Replacing long syllables with two shorts in poetry

Resolution is the metrical phenomenon in poetry of replacing a normally long syllable in the metre with two short syllables. It is often found in iambic and trochaic metres, and also in anapestic, dochmiac and sometimes in cretic, bacchiac, and ionic metres. In iambic and trochaic metres, either the first or the second half of the metrical foot can be resolved, or sometimes both.

The long syllables of dactylic metre are not usually resolved, and resolution is also not found in the last element of a line.

The opposite of resolution is contraction, which is the substitution of one long syllable where the metrical pattern has a double short. Such a position, which is normally two short syllables, as in a dactylic hexameter, is known as a biceps element.

== In Ancient Greek ==
Resolution is generally found in Greek lyric poetry and in Greek and Roman drama, most frequently in comedy.

It should not be confused with a biceps, which is a point in a metre which can equally be two shorts or a long, as is found in the dactylic hexameter. The biceps is freely able to be two shorts or a long, while resolution, particularly in tragedy, can only occur within very restricted situations. Two resolved longa in the same line in Greek is unusual, for instance, while a biceps that is two shorts can freely be followed by another biceps that is two shorts. Also, when two shorts are substituted for a long, they are almost always within the same word-unit.

One example from iambic trimeter:

τίνων τὸ σεμνὸν ὄνομ' ἂν εὐξαίμην κλύων;
tínōn tò semnòn ónom' àn euxaímēn klúōn?
| u – u – | u uu u – | – – u – |
"Whose sacred name would I pray to when I hear it?"
(Sophocles, Oedipus at Colonus 41)

Here the resolved pair is the word ὄνομ', so the resolution stays within the same word-unit. It is also very rare, even in comedy, for a resolution to be found in the last two syllables of a polysyllabic word, such as ἐπίσκοπος "overseer" in the line below:

ἐπίσκοπος ἥκω δεῦρο τῷ κυάμῳ λαχὼν
epískopos hḗkō deûro tôi kuámōi lakhṑn
| u – uu – | – – u – | uu – u – |
"I have come here as an overseer, having been appointed by lot"
(Aristophanes, Birds 1022)

The above example also illustrates another feature of resolution in ancient Greek, namely that in iambic metre, a short element may also be resolved. So here, in the first metron (x – u –), even though it is not permitted for the third element to be a long syllable, it may nonetheless be resolved into two short syllables. But the penultimate element in an iambic trimeter is always short and never resolved.

== In Latin ==
Resolution is quite frequent in the iambic and trochaic metres commonly used in Roman comedy and can be found both in strong (long) elements and in weak (anceps) elements. In comedy there is no restriction on the number of resolutions that can occur in a line; there can even be two in the same foot, e.g. ego fateor or quia tibi and so on. However, in iambic trimeters of the classical period resolution is much rarer. In golden age writers, such as Horace, it is usually found only in the long elements of the line, but in silver age writers, such as Seneca, it can be found in the anceps elements also, especially in the fifth foot.

An example of a trochaic septenarius from comedy with several resolutions is the following:

quíd faci(am)? únd(e) ego núnc tam súbit(o) huic / árgent(um) ínveniám misér?
| – uu – uu | – – uu – || – – – uu | – u – |
"What am I to do? Where can I now so suddenly find money for this man, wretched that I am?"

Certain restrictions apply, however. One restriction, known as Ritschl's law, is that the two resolved syllables should belong to the same word, unless the first word is a monosyllable. Thus faciam or cōnsilium or quid agitur? are all acceptable, but captus amōre would be unusual. (But captus amōre is acceptable in dactylic verse, e.g. Ovid Met. 6.465.)

Another restriction of iambo-trochaic verse, called the Hermann-Lachman law, is that the two short syllables of a resolution should not be the last two syllables of a word; thus phrases like omnibus illīs or omnibus amīcis are almost never found in iambic-trochaic metres (although omnibus illīs is acceptable in dactylic or anapaestic verse). This rule does not apply so strictly in Greek, where a tribrach-shaped word like ἄδικον can sometimes occur with the second and third syllable in a single element.

A possible reason for these restrictions is that in Plautus and Terence's verse iambic and trochaic poetry there is a strong tendency for the word accent to coincide with the beginning of a long elements in the verse, especially in the 2nd, 3rd, and 4th feet of an iambic senarius. A word with three short syllables like facere is always placed so that the first syllable coincides with a long element. A dactylic word like omnibus does sometimes occur, but only in the first foot of a line, where metrical licence is sometimes allowed.

Wherever there is resolution in Roman comedy (but not in later Latin), it is often possible also to find a phenomenon called "iambic shortening" or brevis brevians, whereby the second syllable of a resolved pair counts as short even though it is theoretically long, e.g. recēns nātum (with short -cēns) or volō scīre (with shortened -lo).

In dactylic verse, such as the dactylic hexameter, resolution is not usually allowed, although in two or three places Ennius resolves the first element of a line. In anapaestic verse either the first or the second half of the foot may be resolved, so that an anapaestic foot can be u u –, – –, – u u, or (in comedy but not usually in more serious poetry) u u u u.

Another metre in which resolution is very common is the galliambic, used in Catullus poem 63 (see Galliambic verse).

== Germanic alliterative verse ==
In the alliterative verse tradition of the ancient and medieval Germanic languages, resolution was also an important feature.

In this tradition, if a stressed syllable comprises a short root vowel followed by only one consonant followed by an unstressed vowel (i.e. '(-)CVCV(-)) these two syllables were in most circumstances counted as only one syllable.

For example, in lines 224b-28 of the Old English poem Beowulf, the following emboldened syllables resolve, counting as only one metrical syllable each:

Þanon up hraðe
Wedera lēode on wang stigon,
sǣwudu sǣldon; syrcan hrysedon,
gūðgewǣdo. Gode þancedon
þæs þe him ȳþlāde ēaðe wurdon.

Translation:

From there, upwards, swiftly
the people of the Weders stepped onto land,
tied up sea-wood; they shook their mail-coats,
battle-raiment. They thanked God
that for them the sea-routes turned out easy.

== English iambic pentameter ==
Resolution in the iambic pentameter is rare, but it does sometimes occur. When resolution occurs in a weak position in the line, there are two light unstressed syllables between the stressed ones, often within a polysyllabic word, as in the following examples from Shakespeare:

This fórtificátion, géntlemen, sháll we sée it? (Othello 3.2.5)

And áre upón the Méditerránean flóat (Tempest 1.2.234)

The múltitúdinous séas incárnadíne (Macbeth 2.2.59)

A resolved position can also be a pair of light unstressed non-lexical words:

- I' the name of fame and honour, which dies i' the search (Cymbeline 3.3.51)

Occasionally, however, a strong position can be resolved into a strong and weak syllable, provided that the strong syllable is a light one, as in the word many below:

Cóme to one márk, as mány ways méet in one tówn (Henry V 1.2.208)

== Modern English verse ==
Resolution is also found in modern English verse, for example in the nursery rhyme:

Húmpty | Dúmpty | sát on a | wáll

Here the rhythm consists of four trochaic feet, the last one catalectic (i.e. missing the final syllable). In the third foot, the two short syllables "sat on" correspond to a single long syllable in the other feet. In the music which accompanies the poem, Humpty is a crotchet (half note) and quaver (eighth note), while sat on is a pair of quavers (eighth notes), taking up the same time as the syllable Hump.

In these lines of John Masefield there are again four main stresses. The first two feet each contain two resolutions:

Dírty British | cóaster with a | sált-caked | smóke-stack]
Bútting through the | Chánnel in the | mád March | dáys

In the lines from T. S. Eliot below, there are likewise four main stresses, but with a more complex pattern of resolutions, reflecting the rhythms of ordinary speech:

Whén the train | stárts and the | pássengers are | séttled
to | frúit, peri-| ódicals and | búsiness | létters
