= Ruba'i =

Perso-Arabic quatrain form of poetry

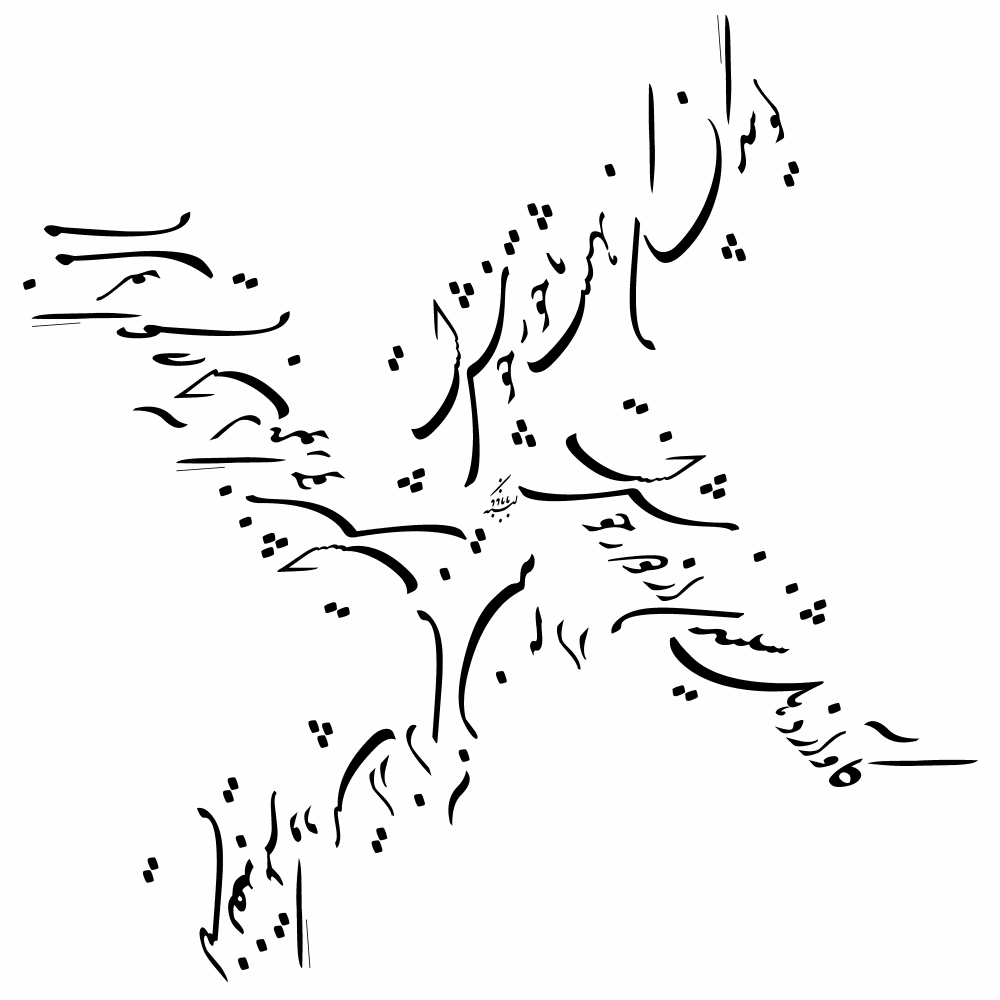
Calligraphic rendition of a ruba'i attributed to Omar Khayyam from Bodleian MS. Ouseley 140 (one of the sources of FitzGerald's Rubaiyat of Omar Khayyam).

A rubāʿī (Classical Persian: رباعی, romanized: robāʿī, from Arabic رباعيّ, rubāʿiyy, 'consisting of four, quadripartite, fourfold'; (Note: From the root ر ب ع (r b ʿ) also occurring in the numeral أربعة (ʾarbaʿa, 'four').) plural: رباعيّات, rubāʿiyyāt) or chahārgāna(e) (Classical Persian: چهارگانه) is a poem or a verse of a poem in Persian poetry (or its derivative in English and other languages) in the form of a quatrain, consisting of four lines (four hemistichs).

In classical Persian poetry, the ruba'i is written as a four-line (or two-couplet / two-distich) poem, with a rhyme-scheme $\mathrm{AABA}$ or $\mathrm{AAAA}$.

This is an example of a ruba'i from Rumi's Divan-e Shams:

Anwār-i Ṣalāḥ-i Dīn bar angēkhta bād
Dar dīda (w)u jān-i ʿāshiqān rēkhta bād
Har jān ki laṭīf gasht u az luṭf guzasht
Bā khāk-i Ṣalāḥ-i Dīn dar-āmēkhta bād

May the splendors of Salahuddin be roused,
And poured into the eyes and souls of the lovers.
May every soul that has become refined and has surpassed refinement
Be mingled with the dust of Salahuddin!

== Metre ==
The usual metre of a Persian ruba'i, which is used for all four lines of the above quatrain by Rumi, is, as follows:

– – u u – u – u – – u u –

In the above scheme, quantitatively, "–" represents a long syllable, and "u" a short one. As variations of this scheme, any sequence of – u, except the final syllable of each line, can be replaced by a single "overlong" syllable, such as gēkh, tīf, luṭf in the poem above, containing either a long vowel followed by a consonant other than "n", or a short vowel followed by two consonants. An overlong syllable, as mentioned, can freely be substituted for the final syllable of the line, as with bād above.

Another variation, as a poetic licence rule, is that occasionally a sequence of two short syllables (u u) can be replaced by a single long one (–).

A third variation is to use the same metre as above, but with the sixth and seventh syllables reversed:

– – u u – – u u – – u u –

== In English ==
The verse form AABA as used in English verse is known as the Rubaiyat Quatrain due to its use by Edward FitzGerald in his famous 1859 translation, Rubaiyat of Omar Khayyam. Algernon Charles Swinburne, one of the first admirers of FitzGerald's translation of Khayyam's medieval Persian verses, was the first to imitate the stanza form, which subsequently became popular and was used widely, as in the case of Robert Frost's 1922 poem "Stopping by Woods on a Snowy Evening".

Quatrain VII from the fourth edition of FitzGerald's Rubaiyat

Come, fill the Cup, and in the fire of Spring
Your Winter-garment of Repentance fling:
The Bird of Time has but a little way
To flutter—and the Bird is on the Wing.

FitzGerald's translation became so popular by the turn of the century that hundreds of American humorists wrote parodies using both the form and, to varying degrees, the content of his stanzas. These included The Rubaiyat of Ohow Dryyam, The Rubáiyát of a Persian Kitten, The Rubaiyat of Omar Cayenne, and The Rubaiyat of Omar Khayyam Jr.

In extended sequences of ruba'i stanzas, the convention is sometimes extended so that the unrhymed line of the current stanza becomes the rhyme for the following stanza. The structure can be made cyclical by linking the unrhymed line of the final stanza back to the first stanza: ZZAZ. These more stringent systems were not, however, used by FitzGerald in his Rubaiyat.
