= Substitution (poetry) =

Poetic device; use of an alien metric foot

In English poetry substitution, also known as inversion, is the use of an alien metric foot in a line of otherwise regular metrical pattern. For instance in an iambic line of "da DUM", a trochaic substitution would introduce a foot of "DUM da".

== Trochaic substitution ==
In a line of verse that normally employs iambic meter, trochaic substitution describes the replacement of an iamb by a trochee.

The following line from John Keats's To Autumn is straightforward iambic pentameter:

To swell the gourd, and plump the hazel shells

Using '°' for a weak syllable, '/' for a strong syllable, and '|' for divisions between feet it can be represented as:

°	/		°	/		°	/		°	/		°	/
To	swell	|	the	gourd,	|	and	plump	|	the	ha-	|	zel	shells

The opening of a sonnet by John Donne demonstrates trochaic substitution of the first foot ("Batter"):

/	°		°	/		°	/		°	/		°	/
Bat-	ter	|	my	heart	|	three-	per-	|	soned	God,	|	for	you	|

Donne uses an inversion (DUM da instead of da DUM) in the first foot of the first line to stress the key verb, "batter", and then sets up a clear iambic pattern with the rest of the line

Shakespeare's Hamlet includes a well-known example:

To be, or not to be: that is the question:
Whether 'tis nobler in the mind to suffer
The slings and arrows of outrageous fortune

In the first line the word that is stressed rather than is, which would be an unnatural accent. The first syllable of Whether is also stressed, making a trochaic beginning to the line.

John Milton used this technique extensively, prompting the critic F. R. Leavis to insultingly call this technique the Miltonic Thump.

== Iambic substitution ==
Sometimes the opposite substitution, of an iamb in place of a trochee, is found.
