= Sotades =

Ancient Greek poet

Sotades (Greek: Σωτάδης; 3rd century BC) was an Ancient Greek poet.

Sotades was born in Maroneia, either the one in Thrace, or in Crete. He lived in Alexandria during the reign of Ptolemy II Philadelphus (285–246 BC). The city was at that time a remarkable center of learning, with a great deal of artistic and literary activity, including epic poetry and the Great Library. Only a few genuine fragments of his work have been preserved; those in Stobaeus are generally considered spurious. Ennius translated some poems of this kind, included in his book of satires under the name of Sota. He had a son named Apollonius. He has been credited with the invention of the palindrome.

Sotades was the chief representative of the writers of obscene and even satirical poems, called "kinaidoi" (Ancient Greek: Κίναιδοι), composed in the Ionic dialect and in the metre named after him. One of his poems attacked Ptolemy II Philadelphus's marriage to his own sister Arsinoe II, from which came the infamous line: "You're sticking your prick in an unholy hole." For this, Sotades was imprisoned, but he escaped to the city of Caunus, where he was afterwards captured by the admiral Patroclus, shut up in a leaden chest, and thrown into the sea.

British Orientalist and explorer Sir Richard Francis Burton (1821–1890) hypothesised the existence of a "Sotadic zone". He asserted that there exists a geographic zone in which pederasty is prevalent and celebrated among the indigenous inhabitants, and named it after Sotades.

== See also ==
- Sotadean metre
