= Anacreontics =

Form of lyrical poetry

Anacreontics are verses in a metre used by the Greek poet Anacreon in his poems dealing with love and wine. His later Greek imitators (whose surviving poems are known as the Anacreontea) took up the same themes and used the Anacreontic meter. In modern poetry, Anacreontics are short lyrical pieces that keep the Anacreontic subject matter but not the metre.

== The Greek meter ==
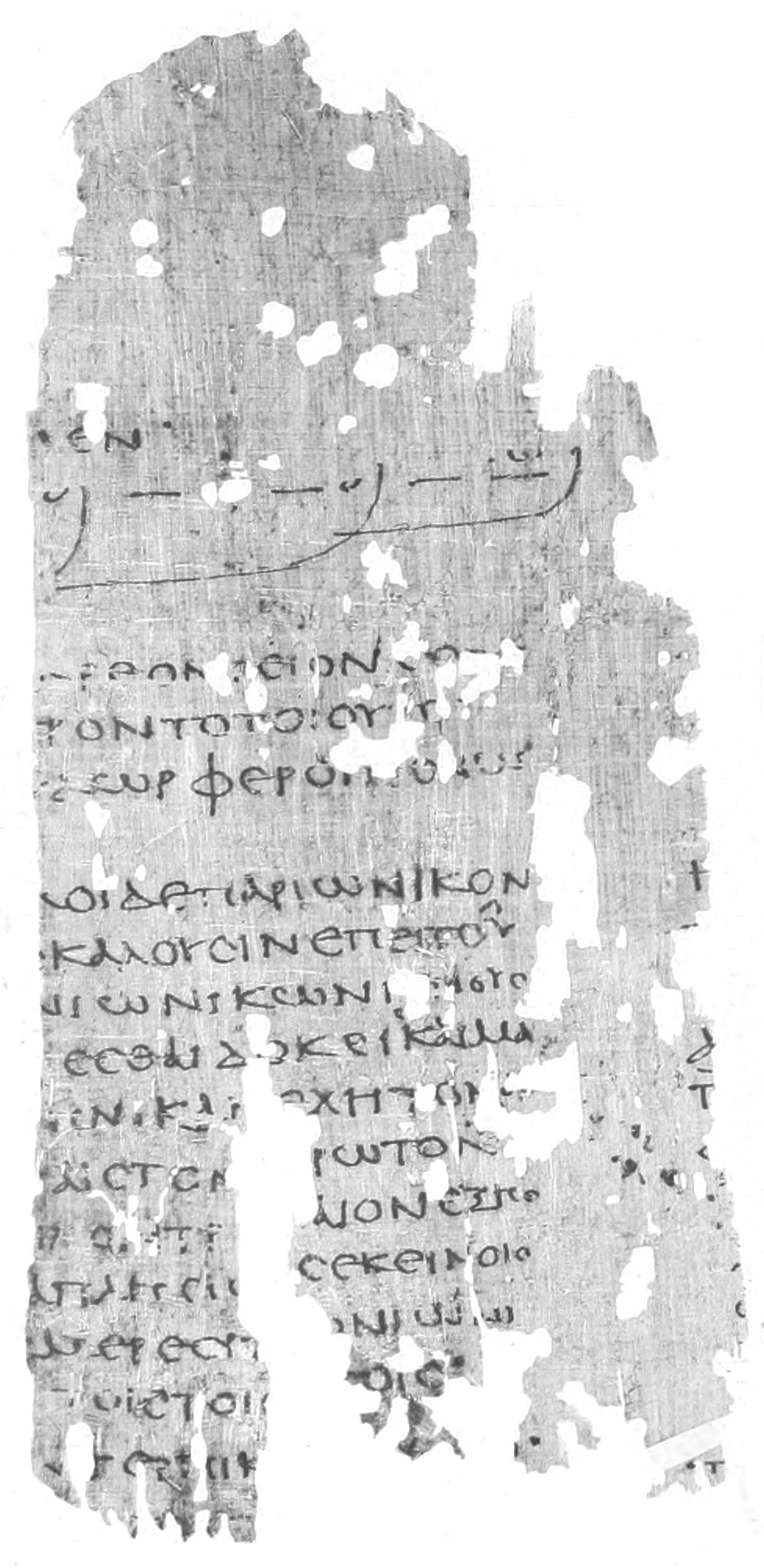
A section from an ancient metrical treatise concerning the anacreonteus. Above the description the lengths of all but the first syllable can be seen marked out; the final syllable is marked as anceps. Near the beginning of the description it is reported that some call the anacreonteus "Parionic" (παριωνικόν) because of its resemblance to the "class of Ionic meters" (Ἰωνικῶν γένους). (P.Oxy. II 220 col. vii, 1st or 2nd century CE).

The Anacreontic verse or anacreonteus is the eight-syllable line u u – u – u – – (where u = breve and – longum). It has been suggested that the anacreontic in its origin may be an "anaclastic" variant of the Ionic dimeter (u u – – u u – –), i.e. an ionic dimeter with the 4th and 5th syllables reversed; but whether this is so or not, the two meters have been associated since Anacreon, who often used them together in compositions.

One example of anacreontics from the corpus of Anacreon is fr. 11b PMG, which ends as follows:

ἄγε δηὖτε μηκέτ' οὕτω
πατάγωι τε κἀλαλητῶι
Σκυθικὴν πόσιν παρ' οἴνωι
μελετῶμεν, ἀλλὰ καλοῖς
ὑποπίνοντες ἐν ὕμνοις.

áge dēûte mēkét' hoútō
patágōi te kalalētôi
Skuthikḕn pósin par' oínōi
meletômen, allà kāloîs
hupopínontes en húmnois.

Translation:

Come (pour) again, but this time
let's not drink our wine Scythian-style
with crashing and shouting,
but drinking gently with
beautiful hymns.

u u – u – u – –
u u – u – u – –
u u – u – u – –
u u – u – u – –
u u – – u u – –

In this extract, the first four lines are anacreontics, while the last is an ionic dimeter.

== Persian ==
The anacreontic rhythm also occurs in classical Persian poetry, for example in the following example from the 13th-century poet Saadi:

man agar nazar harām ast * bas-ī gonāh dāram
če konam? nemītavānam * ke nazar negāh dāram
uu – u – u – – || (u)u – u – (u) – –
"If looking is forbidden, I have plenty of sin.
What am I to do? I can't stop looking!"

The syllables ast, nāh and gāh are "overlong" and count in Persian metre as equivalent to – u.

== English Anacreontics ==
In English poetry, Anacreontics are the title given to short lyrical pieces, of an easy kind, dealing with love and wine. The English word appears to have been first used in 1656 by Abraham Cowley, who called a section of his poems "anacreontiques" because they were paraphrased out of the so-called writings of Anacreon into a familiar measure which was supposed to represent the meter of the Greek.

Half a century later, when the form had been much cultivated, John Phillips (1631–1706) laid down the arbitrary rule that an anacreontic line "consists of seven syllables, without being tied to any certain law of quantity." In the 18th century, the antiquary William Oldys (1696–1761) was the author of a little piece which is the perfect type of an anacreontic; this begins:

"Busy, curious, thirsty fly,
Drink with me, and drink as I;
Freely welcome to my cup,
Could'st thou sip and sip it up.
Make the most of life you may;
Life is short and wears away."

In 1800 Thomas Moore published a collection of erotic anacreontics which are also typical in form; Moore speaks of the necessity of catching "the careless facility with which Anacreon appears to have trifled," as a reason why anacreontics are often tame and worthless. He dwells, moreover, on the absurdity of writing "pious anacreontics," a feat, however, which was performed by several of the Greek Christian poets, and in particular by Gregory of Nazianzus and John of Damascus.

== See also ==
- Anacreontic Society
