= Catalexis =

Term in the study of poetic metre

A catalectic line is a metrically incomplete line of verse, lacking a syllable at the end or ending with an incomplete foot. One form of catalexis is headlessness, where the unstressed syllable is dropped from the beginning of the line.

A line missing two syllables is called brachycatalectic. A line with an additional syllable is called hypercatalectic.

== In English ==
Poems can be written entirely in catalectic lines, or entirely in acatalectic (complete) lines, or a mixture, as in the following carol, composed by Cecil Frances Alexander in 1848. The 7-syllable lines are catalectic:

Once in Royal David's city (8 syllables)
Stood a lowly cattle shed, (7 syllables)
Where a mother laid her Baby (8 syllables)
In a manger for His bed: (7 syllables)
Mary was that mother mild, (7 syllables)
Jesus Christ her little Child. (7 syllables)

It has been argued that across a number of Indo-European languages, when the two types of line are mixed in this way, the shorter line tends to be used as a coda at the end of a period or stanza.

== Blunt and pendant catalexis ==
It has been argued that catalexis can be divided into two types. (Here "x" stands for an anceps syllable.)

(a) When a line with a pendant ending such as trochaic (– u – x) is made catalectic, the result is a line with a blunt (or "masculine") ending (– u –).
(b) When a line with a blunt ending such as iambic (x – u –) is made catalectic, the result is a line with a pendant ending (u – x).

An example of a blunt line becoming pendant in catalexis is Goethe's poem Heidenröslein, or, in the same metre, the English carol Good King Wenceslas:

Good King Wenceslas looked out, (4 beats, blunt)
On the Feast of Stephen, (3 beats, pendant)
When the snow lay round about, (4 beats, blunt)
Deep and crisp and even; (3 beats, pendant)

Another example is the children's song Here We Go Round the Mulberry Bush, of which the first stanza ends as follows:

Here we go round the mulberry bush (4 beats, blunt)
On a cold and frosty morning (3 beats, pendant)

In all of these songs, when they are set to music, there is a lengthening of the penultimate syllable in order to equalise the two lines. However, there is not enough evidence to tell if a similar phenomenon occurred in Ancient Greek.

When a poem is doubly catalectic (brachycatalectic), that is, shortened by two syllables, a blunt ending remains blunt:

Amazing Grace! How sweet the sound (4 beats)
That saved a wretch like me. (3 beats)
I once was lost, but now am found, (4 beats)
Was blind, but now I see. (3 beats)

== Quantitative metres ==
In languages which use quantitative metres, such as Latin, Ancient Greek, Arabic, Persian, and Sanskrit, the final syllable of any line is anceps, that is, indifferently long or short. According to one view dating back to ancient times, even if the final syllable is prosodically short, it counts as long because of the pause which follows it (see brevis in longo). Thus, any line ending x – u –, when catalectic, becomes u – x.

An example in Ancient Greek is the iambic tetrameter, which in normal and catalectic form is as follows:

| x – u – | x – u – | x – u – | x – u – |
| x – u – | x – u – | x – u – | u – – |

In classical Arabic, the most commonly used metre, the ṭawīl, has normal and catalectic forms as follows:

| u – x | u – x – | u – x | u – u – |
| u – x | u – x – | u – u | u – – |

In Sanskrit, a comparison between the traditional śloka and the mandākrāntā metre reveals the same type of catalexis. The first line of the Bhagavad Gita scans as follows:

| – – – – | u – – – || u u – – | u – u – |

whereas the mandākrāntā metre is as follows:

| – – – – | u uu uu – || – u – – | u – – |

A similar phenomenon is also found in classical Persian. For example, the metre based on the choriamb pattern (– u u –) has a shortened form as follows (though both are not used in the same poem):

| – u u – | – u u – | – u u – | – u u – |
| – u u – | – u u – | – u – |

In Latin and Greek, the rarely used trochaic octonarius is not catalectic, but the common trochaic septenarius is catalectic:

| – u – x | – u – x || – u – x | – u – x |
| – u – x | – u – x || – u – x | – u – |

The anapaestic octonarius and anapaestic septenarius differ as follows. When the final syllable is removed, the final element must be a long syllable, not a double short (see Metres of Roman comedy):

| uu – uu – | uu – uu – || uu – uu – | uu – uu – |
| uu – uu – | uu – uu – || uu – uu – | uu – – |

== In ancient Greek ==
Catalexis was common in Greek and Latin meter, and also in ancient Sanskrit verse. Catalectic endings are particularly common where the rhythm of the verse is dactylic ( – u u ), trochaic ( – u ), or anapestic ( u u – ); they tend to be associated with the end of a strophe or period, so much so that it can almost be said that acatalectic forms cannot end a period. In classical verse, the final syllable of a line always counted as long, so that if a dactyl ( – u u ) is made catalectic, it becomes a spondee ( – – ).

Ancient poetry was often performed to music, and the question arises of what music accompanied a catalectic ending. A few ancient Greek poems survive with authentic musical notation. Four of these are by Mesomedes (early second century CE). Secondary sources of Mesomedes' poems To Helios and To Nemesis are in a catalectic meter known as apokrota "sonorous." In each case, in place of the missing short element of the text (i.e., missing syllable) one often finds lengthening signs. In two cases in To Helios, this appears to be a three-note melisma. It is possible that ancient use of catalexis indicated some form of melody or continued singing in place of the missing syllables.

In ancient Greek drama, catalectic meters may have been associated with a male aulete or had some other special use. For example, of Menander's surviving plays, almost all are in iambic trimeters. He changed the meter in one long scene in Misanthrope to a 15-syllable catalectic iambic tetrameter recited to an aulos accompaniment.

== In Latin poetry ==
Poem 25 by Catullus is in iambic tetrameter catalectic. Of Catullus's extant 114 or so poems and fragments, this meter appears only in this poem.

== In classical Persian ==
About 115 different metres are used in Persian poetry, but many of them are rare. The common ones are about 30 in number. Almost all Persian metres are made up of repeated patterns of three, four, or eight syllables, and this makes it easy to see that some metres are catalectic, since the last foot will be one syllable shorter than the others. For example:

| u – – | u – – | u – – | u –
| u – – – | u – – – | u – –
| – u – – | – u – – | – u –
| x u – – | u – u – | u u –

| – u – – | – u – – | – u – – | – u –
| u – u – | u u – – || u – u – | u u –
| x u – – | u u – – | u u – – | u u –

The first four metres above, which have 11 syllables each, are commonly used for long masnavi poems, written in rhyming couplets, such as Ferdowsi's Shahnameh, while the longer metres are used for lyric poems. There is one masnavi metre, however, which has only 10 syllables:

| – – u u | – u – u | – –

Bruce Hayes suggests a rule to explain this, namely that where a pattern ending in u u is made catalectic, both of the short syllables are omitted at the end of the line.

== Catalexis in music ==
Venantius Fortunatus's hymn Pange lingua is in trochaic tetrameter catalectic—the meter of the marching chants of the Roman armies. The hymn is one of the oldest with surviving musical notation.

As Greek meter is often used to describe musical phrasing, some famous themes include:

- The slow movement to Haydn's Surprise Symphony (spondaic dimeter catalectic)
- The theme of Weber's Rondo brillante in E-flat (anapestic tetrameter brachycatalectic)
- The slow movement of Beethoven's 7th symphony (alternating acatalectic and catalectic dactylic tetrameter)

== See also ==
- Acatalexis
- Anacrusis
- Prosody (linguistics)
