= Critical apparatus =

Organized notations & citations regarding the history & content of a primary source work

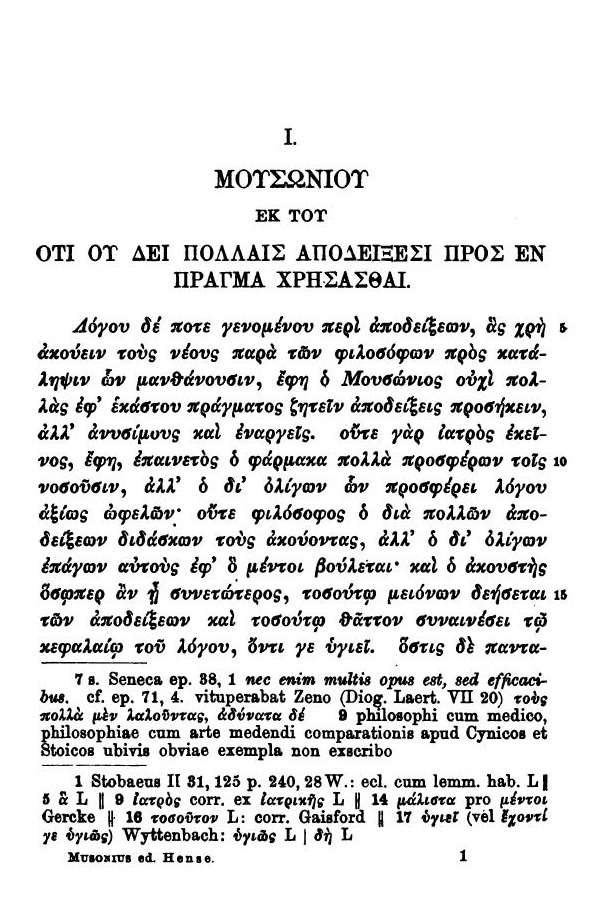
Page 1 of the works of Gaius Musonius Rufus, with critical apparatus

Stemma codium constructed by Cesare Questa, representing relationships of textual witnesses (with their sigla; the lost source text is indicated by Ω) to the works of Roman playwright Plautus, with estimated dates from the IVth through Xth centuries

A critical apparatus (Latin: apparatus criticus) in textual criticism of primary source material, is an organized system of notations to represent, in a single text, the complex history of that text in a concise form useful to diligent readers and scholars. The apparatus typically includes footnotes, standardized abbreviations for the source manuscripts, and symbols for denoting recurring problems (one symbol for each type of scribal error).

As conceived of by one 19th-century editor:

The object of a critical apparatus ... is to enable the earnest student to form his own text. It is therefore an editor's duty to give all the material variants of all the independent manuscripts. It is particularly his duty in a case like the present where there are many passages of which he can give no satisfactory explanation.

== Shakespearean studies ==
Many editions employ a standard format for a critical apparatus, as illustrated by a line from Hamlet, which the Oxford Complete Works (1988) prints as follows:

LAERTES. Alas, then is she drowned.

The apparatus for the line might be rendered as:

4.7.156 Alas, then is she drowned.] HIBBARD; Alas then, is she drown'd? F;
Alas then is she drownd. Q3; Alas, then, she is drownd. Q2;
So, she is drownde: Q1.

The format of the apparatus has several parts:

- The location of the variant in the text (act, scene, line number)
- The lemma, which is the portion of the text to which the note applies
- A right bracket (])
- The source from which the edition took its reading
- A list of variants, in each case followed by the source in which the variant is found, and set off with a semicolon.

To save space, frequently cited sources are usually assigned an abbreviation called a siglum. In Shakespeare editions, F always signifies the First Folio; the second through fourth folios are referred to as F2 through F4 respectively. Similarly, Q1 is the first quarto, Q2 the second quarto, and Q3 the third.

In the example given, the first folio (F) and the three early quartos (Q1 to Q3) each have a different reading of the line in question. The editors have concluded that all four early sources are corrupt, and instead have adopted a reading suggested by G. R. Hibbard. Other editors of the play may choose a different reading of the line. The apparatus summarizes all of the textual evidence, allowing readers to assess for themselves whether the editor has made the best choice. Sometimes the editor will add a commentary, defending the choice made, explaining why other readings were rejected, or discussing how other editors have treated the passage.

This format has been used for critical apparatuses of Shakespeare and many other authors. In variorum editions, the apparatus is often placed at the bottom of the page. Sometimes a three-part format is employed, with the main text at the top of the page, textual variants in the middle, and the editor's commentary at the bottom. This remains the most common format for Shakespeare editions, although the Oxford Complete Works breaks with tradition by putting its critical apparatus in a separately published volume.

== Biblical studies ==
The first printed edition of the New Testament with critical apparatus, noting variant readings among the manuscripts, was produced by the printer Robert Estienne of Paris in 1550. The Greek text of this edition and of those of Erasmus became known as the Textus Receptus (Latin for "received text"), a name given to it in the Elzevier edition of 1633, which termed it as the text nunc ab omnibus receptum ("now received by all").

The Novum Testamentum Graece (1st edition 1898, 28th edition 2014) uses a system of sigla created by Caspar René Gregory in 1908, and extended by Kurt Aland, known as Gregory–Aland numbering; these sigla are widely used in academic writing about the Greek text. The most important uncials are given Hebrew, Roman, or Greek letter names: א ( Codex Sinaiticus), A ( Codex Alexandrinus), D^{p} (Codex Claromontanus), or Ξ (Codex Zacynthius). The papyri are assigned the Blackletter character 𝔓 followed by a superscript number. Here, Papyrus Oxyrhynchus 208 + 1781 (parts of the Gospel of John) is 𝔓^{5} and the Chester Beatty Papyri, which contains the Gospels and Acts, is 𝔓^{45}. The superscript numbers follow the order of registration, and do not reflect the age of the manuscript or order of importance. The minuscules are given plain numbers, and the lectionaries are notated by script (ℓ), ranging from ℓ 1 up to ℓ 2463.

For Vetus Latina manuscripts, sigla are related to content, so they are not unique. For example, the letter t refers to Codex Bernensis in the gospels, but Liber Comicus elsewhere, which may lead to confusion. Other means of identifying manuscripts include a full name (usually something Codex [city]-ensis) and the standard unique serial number for each manuscript given by its custodian (usually a library).

Sigla, names and numbers serve different scholarly purposes. Sigla, in the context of reference to an original document, provide unique and concise identification of witnesses to the text of that original, suited to minimising the space taken by citation in a critical apparatus. Names, on the other hand, normally refer to specific handwritten volumes (often including other text), either as originally bound or in their current form. Names are typically Latin, and can refer to the place of composition (Codex Sangallensis, "Book from St. Gall") or rediscovery (Stonyhurst Gospel), the current location (Liber Ardmachanus, "Book of Armagh"), a famous owner (Codex Bezae, "Theodore Beza's Book"), a volume's function (Liber Comicus, "The Lectionary"), or can even refer to physical characteristics of a volume (Codex Gigas, "The Huge Book" or Codex Aureus, "The Gold Book"). The Book of Mulling is also known as Liber Moliensis after the name of the scribe, as tradition has it.

== From footnotes to endnotes ==
In the United States, bibliographer Fredson Bowers (1905–1991) established a tradition of putting the critical apparatus at the back of the book, leaving the edited text clear of apparatus. This has the advantage of leaving the main text uncluttered with editorial details that may not be of interest to the general reader. However, this format is a disadvantage to scholarly readers, who are not able to see all of the textual evidence in one place.

== Digital representation ==
The de facto standard for the representation of critical apparatus in digital scholarly editions is to follow the recommendations of the Text Encoding Initiative. While other formats are also used in digital literary studies this has become the most accepted storage format.
