= Metres of Roman comedy =

Metres used in Plautus and Terence

Roman comedy is mainly represented by two playwrights, Plautus (writing between c.205 and 184 BC) and Terence (writing c.166-160 BC). The works of other Latin playwrights such as Livius Andronicus, Naevius, Ennius, and Caecilius Statius are now lost except for a few lines quoted in other authors. 20 plays of Plautus survive complete, and 6 of Terence.

Various metres are used in the plays. The most common are iambic senarii and trochaic septenarii. As far as is known, iambic senarii were spoken without music; trochaic septenarii (and also iambic septenarii and trochaic and iambic octonarii) were chanted or recited (or possibly sung) to the sound of a pair of pipes known as tībiae (the equivalent of the Greek aulos), played by a tībīcen ("piper"); and other metres were sung, possibly in an operatic style, to the same tībiae.

In Plautus about 37% of lines are unaccompanied iambic senarii, but in Terence more than half of the verses are senarii. Plautus's plays therefore had a greater amount of musical accompaniment than Terence's. Another difference between the playwrights was that polymetric songs (using metres other than iambic and trochaic) are frequent in Plautus (about 14% of the plays), but hardly used at all by Terence.

The different metres lend themselves to different moods: calm, energetic, comic, mocking, high-flown, grandiose, humorous, and so on. Certain metres are also associated with different kinds of characters; for example, old men frequently use iambic senarii, while the iambic septenarii are often used in scenes when a courtesan is on the stage.

The metres of Roman comedy tend to be more irregular than those of the classical period, but there is an opportunity to hear in them the rhythms of normal Latin speech. Cicero wrote of the senarius: "But the senarii of comic poets, because of their similarity to ordinary speech, are often so degraded that sometimes it's almost impossible to discern metre and verse in them."

== The commonest metres ==
A publicly available database by Timothy J. Moore at the Washington University in St. Louis (see External links below) identifies the metre of every line of the two poets (based on the work of Cesare Questa and Wallace Lindsay) and gives detailed statistics for the use of the various metres. From this database it is apparent that by far the commonest metres, accounting for 79% of the lines in the two playwrights, are the following two:

- Iambic senarius (ia6): 11,170 lines

| x – x – | x, – x – | x – u – |

- Trochaic septenarius (tr7): 10,019 lines

| – x – x | – x – x || – x – x | – u – |

In the above schemata, the symbol "–" represents a long element or longum, "u" a short element or breve, and "x" an anceps, an element that can be either long or short. The schemata in this section are the basic patterns, and do not take into account the variations which may occur, for example the substitution of two short syllables for a long one. These are explained in greater detail below.

The following iambic and trochaic metres are also found but are less common:

- Iambic septenarius (ia7): 1,718 lines

| x – x – | x – u – || x – x – | x – – | 

- Iambic octonarius (ia8): 1,267 lines

| x – x – | x – u – || x – x – | x – u – | (type A)
| x – x – | x – x – | x, – x – | x – u – | (type B)

- Trochaic octonarius (tr8): 211 lines

| – x – x | – x – x || – x – x | – x – – |

The following metres are used for songs, and are found mainly in Plautus:

- Bacchiac quaternarius (ba4): 375 lines

| x – – | x – – || x – – | x – – |

- Cretic quaternarius (cr4): 259 lines

| – x – | – u – || – x – | – u – |

The following anapaestic metres are found only in Plautus but not in Terence:

- Anapaestic septenarius (an7): 216 lines

| uu – uu – | uu – uu – || uu – uu – | uu – – |

- Anapaestic octonarius (an8): 212 lines

| uu – uu – | uu – uu – || uu – uu – | uu – uu – |

- Anapaestic quaternarius (an4): (at least) 135 lines

| uu – uu – | uu – uu – |

Together, the ten metres listed above account for all but about 1% of the 27,228 lines of the two poets.

== Differences between Plautus and Terence ==
The metres are used in different proportions by the two playwrights. In Plautus, 47% of the lines are iambic, 43% trochaic, and 10% in other metres (mostly anapaestic, bacchiac, and cretic). In Terence, 75% of the lines are iambic, 24% trochaic, and only 1% in other metres (bacchiac and cretic).

In Plautus, 37% of the lines are unaccompanied iambic senarii, but in Terence 56%. More than 4% of Plautus's lines are anapaestic, but this metre is not used at all in Terence. The trochaic septenarius is much more frequent in Plautus (41%) than in Terence (22%). The trochaic octonarius is slightly more frequent in Terence (1.5%) than in Plautus (0.6%). On the other hand, Terence makes much more use of the iambic octonarius metre than Plautus.

In Plautus a change of metre often accompanies the exit or entrance of a character, and thus frames a scene. At other times it indicates a change of pace, such as when Amphitruo's slave Sosia changes from iambic octonarii to a cretic metre when he begins to describe a battle.

In Terence different metres accompany different characters: for example, in each of Terence's plays, the woman loved by a young man uses iambic septenarii; in the Heauton Timorumenos, Eunuchus, and Phormio, one of the two young men is associated with trochaics, the other with iambics. Thus there can be frequent changes of metre within a single scene.

About 15% of Plautus's plays on average consists of polymetric cantica (songs in a mixture of metres). In these, the most common metres are the bacchius (x – – ) and cretic (– x –), together with anapaests (u u –), but sometimes with other metres mixed in. One play (Miles) has no polymetric cantica, but Casina has four. Because of metrical ambiguities, the analysis of the metres of cantica can be disputed.

== The ABC metrical pattern ==
It has been noted that in both playwrights, but especially in Plautus, the use of different metres tends to form a pattern, which Moore refers to as the "ABC succession". Often a play can be divided into sections, which follow the pattern: A = iambic senarii, B = other metres, C = trochaic septenarii. In Plautus's Menaechmi, for example, the first four sections follow the ABC scheme, and only the 5th is different; thus the whole scheme is ABC, ABC, ABC, ABC, ACBCBC. In his Pseudolus, in the same way, the ABC pattern is used four times, followed by a final scene of 91 lines in other metres, making ABC, ABC, ABC, ABC, B. However, not all plays follow this scheme. For example, in Terence's Adelphoe, the pattern is ABCBAB, ABC, BCACB, AC, ABABC. In general it appears that Terence changes mode more frequently than Plautus. Four of Plautus's plays (Cistellaria, Stichus, Epidicus, and Persa) open directly with music, omitting the customary expository speech in unaccompanied iambic senarii.

The B-sections of the plays tend to be songs in which the characters express their mood or character, or sing of love. The C-sections (in trochaic septenarii) tend to be associated with advancement of the plot. "The beginning of the first long series of trochaic septenarii usually marks a moment at which, after exposition and presentation of character, the plot begins to proceed in earnest." (Moore) When a playwright moves directly from A to C, it often marks urgency or an especially significant moment in the plot.

== Verse ictus and word accent ==
=== Ictus ===
In his Ars Poētica, Horace described the senarius as having "six beats" (sēnōs ictūs). However, there is some controversy among scholars over what this means and to what extent word accent played a role in Plautus and Terence's verse.

On one side, supporting the idea of an ictus or beat, are scholars such as W. Sidney Allen, Lionel Pearson, and from an earlier generation E.H. Sturtevant and Wallace Lindsay. Sturtevant writes: "It is scarcely possible any longer to doubt that accent was an important feature of early dramatic verse; the quantitative nature of the measures was carefully preserved, but at the same time accent was constantly taken into account."

However, many scholars, such as Paul Maas, Cesare Questa, and Wolfgang de Melo argue that there was no beat or "ictus"; in their view, rhythm is "simply the regulated sequence of short and long syllables". Similarly, Benjamin Fortson writes: "The theory that there was a verse-ictus, never universally accepted, has by now been thoroughly discredited." Gratwick, in his edition of the Menaechmi, takes an intermediate position, rejecting "both the Anglo-German view that the lines are isochronous with a regular metrical beat attached to every longum, and the Franco-Italian view that there is no ictus at all in such verses".

One fact which is generally agreed on is that in iambic and trochaic metres, there is usually a fairly strong agreement between where the ictus is assumed to be and the accent of the words. Thus in iambics a word-accent is generally heard on the 2nd, 4th, 6th and 8th elements of the line:

nē quis mīrētur quī sim, paucīs ēloquār.

| – – – – | – – – – | – – u – |

"In case anyone is wondering who I am, let me explain briefly."

Whereas in trochaics, the accent is usually heard on the 1st, 3rd, 5th, and 7th elements:

vīvō fīt quod numquam quisquam mortuō faciēt mihī.

| – – – – | – – – – || – u – uu | – u – |

"It's happening to me alive what no one will ever do to me when I am dead!"

Thus even though both lines begin with a series of long syllables, it is clear on reading them that the first is iambic and second trochaic.

The match between accent and ictus is not exact. For example, in the final metron of an iambic line, there is often a clash between ictus and accent. Gratwick's view is that so far from attempting to make the word accent match the ictus, Roman writers often deliberately tried to avoid such coincidence, especially at the beginning and end of the line, to avoid monotony.

The following table shows the percentage of anceps positions in the iambic senarius which are accented. It is based on a survey by J. J. Schlicher of the 533 iambic senarius lines in Plautus's Trinummus. Overall only 20% of anceps positions are accented. The 2nd, 3rd and 4th are rarely accented, but in the 5th and 6th there is quite often a clash of accent and metrical ictus:

anceps	1st	2nd	3rd	4th	5th	6th
+accent	26%	8%	7%	12%	32%	44%

There is disagreement, however, about whether this avoidance of accent in the 2nd, 3rd, and 4th anceps was deliberately aimed for by the poets, or whether it just happened automatically as a result of placing a caesura after the 5th element.

Because it seems that the poets made an effort to place the accent mostly on the long elements, it is argued by Lindsay that occasionally it may be possible to detect from this how Latin was pronounced. For example, the phrase miser sum or miser sīs occurs six times in Plautus with the syllable -ser in the long element, suggesting that it was accented on this syllable. Similarly it has been suggested that the phrase volŭptās mea "my darling", with shortened -lup, may have been pronounced with the accent on -tās. However, there is no agreement among scholars about this, especially French and Italian scholars, most of whom believe that the Latin accent was a musical one which had no effect on the metre.

=== Percussiōnēs ===
Rather than ictūs, ancient writers sometimes speak of percussiōnēs made three times in a senarius. The rhetorician Quintilian wrote: "You can call it a trimeter or a senarius without any difference; since it has six feet (pedes), but three beats (percussiones)". In his book on metres, Terentianus Maurus explains: "For the iambus itself remains in six places, and for that reason the name senarius is given; but a beat is made three times, hence it is called a trimeter; because when scanning we join together the feet in pairs." Terentianus also indicates that teachers of metre would click their fingers or tap their foot (pollicis sonōre vel plausū pedis) in time with the second foot in each metron, that is, the one which is usually an iamb, not a spondee, dactyl or an anapaest. "In this way what was a senarius becomes a trimeter".

A question therefore is whether, if there was a beat, there was one beat per foot or one every metron (group of two feet); and if it was one per metron, on which of the two long elements was it made?

Should the following trochaic septenarius be read with eight beats, for example?

nōnn(e) hāc noctū nostra nāvis hūc ex portu Persicō

Or is it better to read it with four beats, as follows?

nōnn(e) hāc noctū nostra navis hūc ex portū Persicō

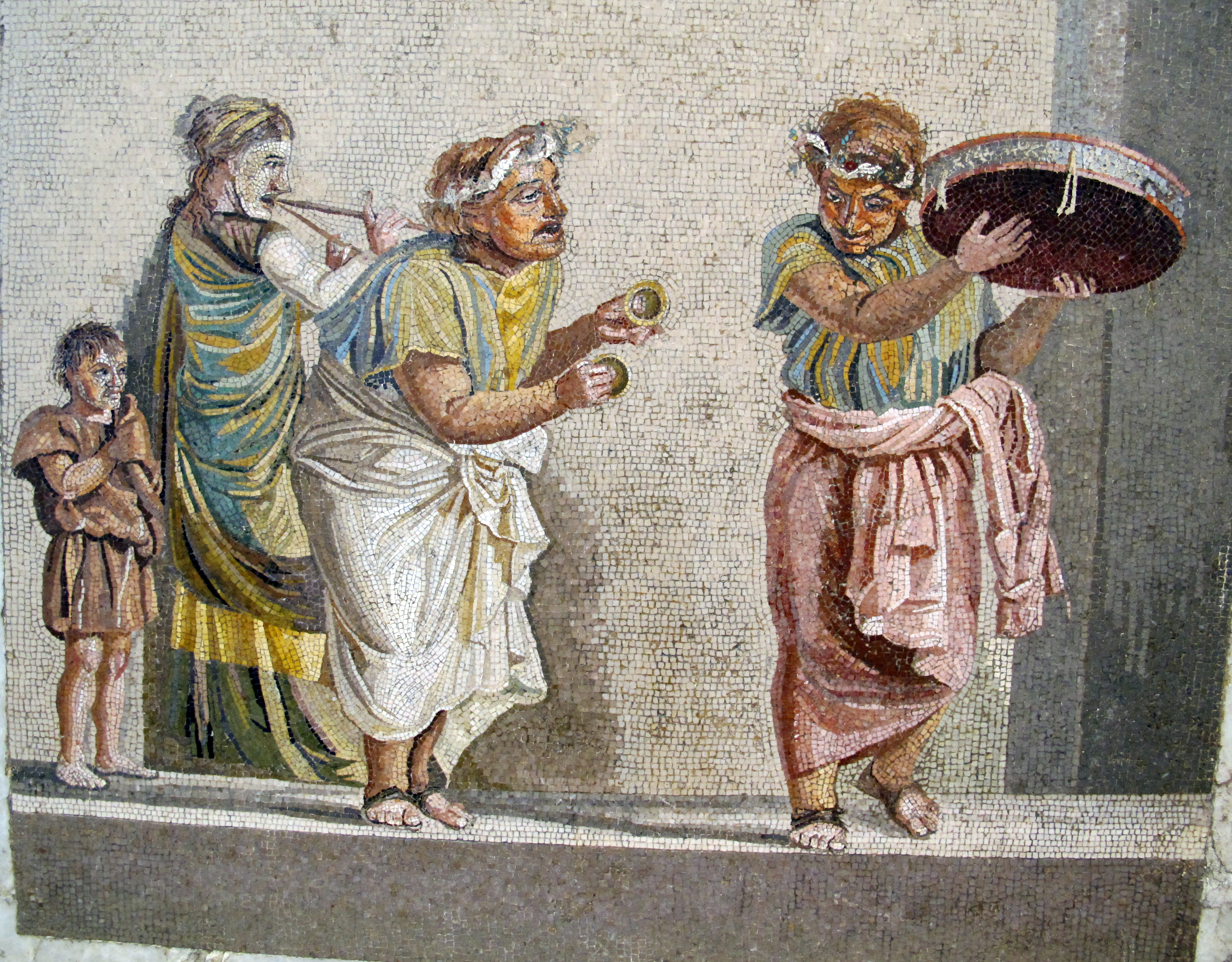
Trio of musicians playing tībiae, cymbala, and tympanum (mosaic from Pompeii)

After examining the evidence Moore suggests that in Roman comedy, the pipe-player (tībīcen) "provided some emphasis to all strong elements, maintaining the sense of feet, but that the "beats" on the odd-numbered feet were stronger."

The evidence suggests that the key parts of an iambic senarius were the 4th, 8th, and 12th positions. Lindsay wrote:

Iambic, like Trochaic and Anapaestic Metre, was scanned by Dipodies, not by single feet. The chief metrical ictus of the line, in other words the syllables at which the baton of a conductor keeping time would fall, were in an Iambic Trimeter the 2nd, 4th, and 6th Arses (in a Trochaic Tetrameter the 1st, 3rd, 5th, and 7th). Hence the necessity of exhibiting the metre in its pure form at these parts of the line (Bassus ap. Rufin. 555K; Terent. 2246 sqq. K).

Despite this statement, Lindsay, when he wished to show the ictus in a senarius, placed an accent on the 2nd, 6th, and 10th positions, for example:

sequere hác me, gnata, ut múnus fungarís tuom
("follow me this way, daughter, so that you can perform your duty")

Richard Bentley in the 17th/18th century followed the same practice. On the other hand, Gratwick in his edition of the Menaechmi edition, and Barsby in his edition of Terence's Eunuchus, mark the position of the strong element in each foot in the iambo-trochaic metres. It is argued that this can help the student with reading the verse aloud. An example is the following iambic septenarius (Terence Phormio 820), where the three elisions (s(um), ses(e), fratr(i)), the brevis breviāns (utŭt), and the pronunciation of meae as one syllable by synizesis make the rhythm of the line difficult for the untrained reader unless the ictus is marked at least every other foot:

laetus s(um), utŭt meae rēs sēs(ē) habent, frātr(ī) optigisse quod volt.

| – – uu – | – – u – || – – u – | u – – | ia7

"I am happy, however my own situation may be, that things have turned out for my brother as he wishes."

But though such markings may help students with scansion and the rhythm with which the line should be read, it is not generally thought that the accent was heard on those syllables if there was a clash between the ictus and the natural accent of the word. Where the word accent is at odds with the ictus, it is more natural to follow the accent (just as is the case when reading Virgil).

Another question is whether, if there was a perceptible beat, it was heard at regular intervals as in modern western music, or irregularly. Gratwick argues that the ictus was not isochronous, but that the timing depended on whether the anceps syllables were long or short. Not all scholars agree with this, however; Pearson, in his edition of Aristoxenus's treatise on rhythm, argues that it was possible or likely that in an iambic line the length of the syllables was adjusted to make the bars of equal length.

Various illustrations from the time of the Roman empire show a tībīcen wearing a sort of clapper, called a scabellum, on one foot. One such mosaic, showing a tībīcen accompanying a dancer, is illustrated in Moore's book Music in Roman Comedy. Cicero mentions the word in connection with a mime performance. However, there is no evidence that such a clapper was used to accompany Roman comedies.

== Prosody of Plautus and Terence ==
=== Resolved elements ===
Any element in an iambic or trochaic line except the last two can be resolved into (i.e. replaced by) two short syllables (marked "uu" in the scansions below). The final element of the line is always a single syllable, either long or brevis in longo (i.e. a short final syllable which counted as long, as in the word Geta in the first example below).

Either a longum or an anceps can be resolved, but resolution of a longum is more common. In the following iambic senarius, the first two resolutions are in longa, and the third is in an anceps:

quis m(ī) igitur drachumam reddet, sī dederō tibī?

| – uu – uu | – – – – | uu – u – | (ia6)

"So who will give me the drachma back, if I give it to you?"

The following example, in the trochaic septenarius metre, has four resolved elements. The first, second, and fourth of these are a resolved anceps:

quid faci(am)? und(e) ego nunc tam subit(o) huic argent(um) inveniam miser?

| – uu – uu | – – uu – || – – – uu | – u – | (tr7)

"What am I to do? From where am I to find money for this man so suddenly, wretched me!"

A resolved element can occasionally contain a brevis brevians (see below).

=== Brevis breviāns (iambic shortening) ===
The prosody and grammar of Plautus and Terence differ slightly from that of later poets such as Virgil and Ovid. One such difference is the frequently occurring phenomenon of brevis breviāns or "iambic shortening" (correptiō iambica), in which two syllables with iambic rhythm (u –), such as in the word habēs or the phrase quid est? or the first two syllables of a longer word such as voluptātem, in some circumstances can be scanned as two short syllables (u u).

The literal meaning of brevis breviāns is "a short syllable which shortens (a following long one)".

As a rule, brevis breviāns is found in places in iambo-trochaic metres where either an anceps element or a longum element is resolved into two short syllables. Examples of the first, where an anceps element is resolved, are Iovĭs iússū, volŏ scīre, minŭs qu(am) ūllus, volŭptās mea, suăm mātrem, háud mală (e)st múlier. Examples of the second type, where a longum element in the metre is resolved, are: quíd ĕst? quid métuis?, hábĕs quod fáciās, ábĭ sīs īnsciēns, tíb(i) hŏc praecípiō, quíd ăbstulístī. As with resolution, brevis brevians either occurs within a word or when the first syllable is a monosyllabic word such as quid.

Another place where iambic shortening frequently occurs is in the two short syllables of an anapaest (u u –), e.g. vidĕn hanc?, obsequĕns fīam.

Brevis breviāns is not compulsory, and it is possible for the same phrase to be found sometimes with and sometimes without iambic shortening. For example, latent / in ŏccúltō vs. in óccultō latent; vs. apŭd mē vs. apúd mē.

In the majority of cases, the shortened syllable in iambic shortening is a syllable ending in a consonant, as in Iovis iussū or voluptātem, or a long vowel at the end of a word, e.g. volo, ibi. It only rarely occurs in a non-final open syllable with a long vowel as in amĭcitia (Plaut. Trinummus 153).

Pronouns such as ille, iste, hic are particularly frequently subject to brevis breviāns: quod ĭlle, quid ĭstuc, quid ĭs fēcit, et ĭllōs etc. As the above examples show, the short syllable which causes the shortening is usually either a monosyllable or part of the same word as the shortened syllable.

What appears to be iambic shortening is also sometimes found in the second and third syllables of the sequence u u u –, as in nūlla mihĭ rēs or ut egŏ núnc. However, these cases usually involve words such as mihi and ego which can have a short final vowel even in the classical period. Fattori therefore argues that this type should be regarded as a separate phenomenon from the normal iambic shortening described above.

Usually the shortened syllable is unaccented. Many scholars claim that the scansion can therefore give clues as to how Latin was pronounced in normal speech. For example, it is argued by Lindsay and others that in the phrase volŭptās mea "my darling", where the syllable lup is shortened, the accent was on the syllable -tās (this however is disputed by Radford). Another suggestion is that the phrase apúd mē "at my house", scanned (u – –), shows the normal pronunciation where púd is accented; but when it is scanned (u u –), the emphasis is on the word mē, i.e., apŭd mē "at my house".

Others believe that a condition for brevis breviāns is that neither syllable of the sequence u – should have full stress, but that rather, in a phrase such as videtqu(e) ipse "and he himself sees", the first word must become de-stressed before the brevis breviāns can take place. Fattori (2021), however, disputes this and points out some cases where the shortened syllable is apparently accented, for example, sed ŭxōr scelesta (Plaut. Rud. 895) or vel ŏptumō vel pessumō (Plaut. Most. 410).

Although iambic shortening is common in iambo-trochaic metres and anapaests, it is almost never found in cretics or bacchiacs. Iambic shortening is also occasionally found in the fragments of Early Latin tragedy and in Ennius's hexameters in a passage quoted by Apuleius (Apol. 39). But apart from in certain common words such as bene, male, ego, mihi, tibi, sibi, ubi, ibi, nisi, quasi, modo, and nescio, it is not usually found in poetry of the classical period.

=== Elision ===
Elision (the removal or partial removal of a final vowel when the next word starts with a vowel or h) is "far more frequent and various in Plautus and Terence than in other Latin verse-writers". For example, in the second of the trochaic septenarii lines which follow there are no fewer than six elisions:

attat! illīc hūc itūrust. / īb(ō) eg(ō) illīc obviam,
nequ(e) eg(ō) hŭnc homin(em) hūc hodi(ē) ad aedīs / hās sin(am) umqu(am) accēdere.

| –  u –  – | –  u – – || – u – – | – u – | tr7
| uu u uu – | uu u – – || – u – – | – u – |

"Aha! there he is about to come here; I will go to meet him,
nor shall I ever allow this man to come here near to this house today."

This line of Terence has five elisions:

(ō) audāci(am)! etiam m(e) ultr(o) accūsāt(um) advenīt

| – – u uu | – – – – | – – u – | ia6

O the audacity! He's even coming to accuse me of his own accord!"

As shown above in homin(em) and sin(am) unqu(am), a final syllable ending in -m will also usually be elided. Long open monosyllables such as dē, quae, hī, dum, quom, rem are sometimes totally elided, and sometimes merely shortened.

How exactly an elision was pronounced is unknown. It is possible that a short vowel was completely omitted. When a long vowel was involved, however, it is probable that an element of it could still be heard, for example in the following line, where complete omission would cause ambiguity:

optum(ō) optum(ē) optum(am) operam / dās, datam pulchrē locās

| – u – u | – u uu – || – u – – | – u – |

"You are giving an excellent service excellently for the most Excellent; and you will be rewarded well for your gift."

Sometimes in Plautus (but not in Terence) there can be a hiatus (i.e. no elision) between vowels at the break between the two halves of a verse, that is after the fifth element of a senarius or the 8th element of a septenarius. There can also be brevis in longō at this point. But frequently at the break there is no hiatus but an elision. Elision can also take place even when there is a change of speaker in the middle of a line.

=== Prodelision ===
Prodelision (the removal of the first vowel of est or es) is also common, for example pugnātumst for pugnātum est and itūru's for itūrus es. Also common is opust "there is need" for opus est.

=== Synizesis ===
Quite commonly in Plautus the two adjacent vowels in words such as eōsdem, ni(h)il, eum, eō, huius, eius, cuius, mi(h)ī, meās, tuom were merged into one syllable by a process known as synizesis. However, if it suited the metre, they could also be kept separate.

=== Other prosodic points ===
Vowels which later became shortened before -t or -r retained their length in Plautus, e.g. amāt, habitāt, vidēt, cavēt, audīt, velīt, habēt, fīt, dūcōr, loquōr, labōr, mātēr, etc.

The words mīles, es, ter were pronounced mīless, ess, terr.

Plautus also made use of alternative forms, such as sim/siem, dem/duim, surpiō/surripiō, dīxtī/dīxistī, mālim/māvelim, ille/illĭc, mē/mēd, tē/tēd, hau/haud, when it suited his metre.

In both poets phrases like de illā, cum illā, cum eõ could be pronounced with the scansion u u –. In Plautus (but not Terence) are also found phrases like tuam amīcam, domi erat where the first word is scanned u u. Lindsay compares forms in later Latin such as coeō, circuit where the preposition is similarly reduced to a short syllable but not completely elided.

In words ending in -us or -is, such as eru(s), esti(s), the final syllable was regularly scanned short before a consonant.

Words of the rhythm | u u u x |, such as mulierem or facilius, are thought by some scholars to have been stressed on the first syllable, since they are frequently used in situations, such as the end of a line, where the rhythm is normally – u –. The initial word-accent is however disputed by Questa.

A mute plus liquid consonant (e.g. tr in patrem) did not make the previous syllable long in Plautus or Terence.

Some words ending in -e, such as nempe, unde, ille could be pronounced nemp’, und’, ill’ before a consonant.

The masculine pronoun hic "this man", which was later pronounced "hicc", was still pronounced with a single c in Plautus. But the neuter hoc (derived from *hod-ce) was pronounced "hocc", unless shortened by brevis brevians.

The combinations hic quidem, tū quidem and sī quidem can be pronounced with a short vowel in the first syllable, i.e. either | u u – | or | – u – |.

== Iambo-trochaic "laws" ==
When the metres of Plautus and Terence came to be studied carefully in the 19th century, a number of "laws" or tendencies were discovered, which are described below.

=== Ritschl's law ===
==== The rule ====
Almost any long or anceps element can be resolved, that is, split into two short syllables. Ritschl's law states that when this happens the two short syllables must be either in the same word, or the first one is a monosyllable.

Thus iubeō, inveniam, subitō are acceptable, as are et eum, quid ego and ub(i) erit. But resolutions such as *cārus amīcus are not usually found except sometimes in anapaestic metres.

==== Exception ====
Occasionally, when a long and anceps (– x) are realised as a tribrach (u u u), the law may be broken. Thus omnia patris, dīcere voluī, omnibus ere are allowed, but only when the second of the two words is accented on its first syllable. Some of these exceptions might be taken as examples of a locus Jacobsohnianus (see below).

=== Hermann-Lachman law ===
Another law, called the Hermann-Lachman law, states that in iambo-trochaic metres resolution is not allowed in the last two syllables of a word such as omnibus or dīcere with a dactylic ending (– u u), or of a word with a tribrach ending (u u u) such as senibus, facere or eximere.

Combinations such as dīcere. – Numquid, or omnibus īsdem, or omnibus amīcis are rare and often emended away by editors. But four-syllable words with an elided last syllable were apparently allowed, e.g. auxili(um) argentārium, ēloquer(e) audācter mihī.

Another exception to the law is the word nescio, which usually has a short -o in expressions such as nesciŏ quid "something" or nescio quis "someone". This seems to be treated as if it was a compound ne-scio.

There appear to be no exceptions to the rule in the case of tribrach-ending words such as senibus. This rule applies in Latin but not in Greek, where a word like ἄδικον can replace an iamb.

Both Ritschl's law and the Hermann-Lachman law are less strictly observed in the short syllables of anapaestic metres.

=== Meyer's law ===
==== The rule ====
"Meyer's law" (/ˈmaɪər/, rhyming with "higher") states that the poets avoided placing a word such as veheménter, with a spondaic ending, at the end of an iambic metron, or ending on the 3rd element of a trochaic metron.

Thus a word with an iambic ending is freely allowed at the end of an iambic metron, like amāns in the line below:

sed postqu(am) amāns accessit pretium pollicēns

| –  –  u  – | –  –  –  uu | –  –  u  – | ia6

"But after a lover approached promising money..."

An elided word, such as factūr(um) is also acceptable, as in this iambic line:

ego iuss(ī), et dīxit sē factūr(am) uxōr mea

| uu –  –  – | –  –  –  – | –  –  u  – | ia6

"I ordered it, and my wife said she would do it"

The reason for Meyer's law is believed (at any rate by most English-speaking scholars) to be connected with the Latin word accent. In the original Greek version of these metres, the 3rd element of an iambic metron as always short: | x – u – |; similarly the second element of a trochaic metron is always short: | – u – x |. The effect of Meyer's law was to ensure that the element which was short in Greek was also short in Latin, or, if long, was at least "light", that is, unaccented.

==== Exceptions ====
Although Meyer's law is observed in the majority of cases, there are some lines where it is not observed; for example, in the following line from Terence in the word vēmenter "very greatly" there is a long accented syllable in the third element of the metron, possibly to emphasise the word:

amōqu(e) et laud(ō) et vēmenter dēsīderō

| u  –  –  – | –  –  –  – | –  –  u  – | ia6

"I love and praise and oh, so badly miss her!"

The following example comes from Plautus:

is nunc Amphitruō praefectust legiōnibus

| – – – uu | – – – – | uu – u – | ia6

"this Amphitruo is now in command of the legions"

It is usual for violations of Meyer's law in the second metron to be followed by a four-syllable word (like dēsīderō above) or a monosyllable plus three-syllable (such as sī dīxerit); so that even though there is a clash between ictus and accent in the second metron, coincidence is restored in the third.

When Meyer's law is violated in the first metron (which is less common), the following element is usually a monosyllable, maintaining the usual caesura:

veniāt quandō volt, atqu(e) ita nē mihĭ sīt morae

| uu – – – | – – uu – | uu – u – | ia6

"Let him come whenever he wants, so I don't have to wait."

=== Luchs's law (the Bentley-Luchs law) ===
==== The rule ====
"Luchs's law" (/lʊks/), or the "Bentley-Luchs law", concerns lines where the final word is disyllabic, such as patre or malī. If this is the case, then the preceding anceps must be long. (This law also applies to the 7th–8th elements of ia7 and ia8.)

Thus phrases such as quemque cōnspicōr or contumēliae or hūmānō patre or ēveniāt patrem are all acceptable as endings of a senarius or trochaic septenarius, but *optumō patre (– | u – u –) would not be acceptable.

It is argued that the rationale behind this law is that an iambic word at the beginning of the third metron might give the false impression that the line had come to an end. The rule inevitably means that when the last word is disyllabic, the word-accent will be heard on the first element of the metron (i.e. contrary to the presumed ictus); but apparently in the last metron rhythmical considerations were more important than stress.

==== Exceptions ====
Two groups of exceptions are found: (1) when the final iambic word is preceded by a paeonic rhythm (u u u –), for example: in alium diem or at etiam rogās; (2) when the two words are closely bound in sense, for example: in malam crucem or bonā fidē.

=== Locus Jacobsohnianus ===
The locus Jacobsohnianus is the 8th position of an iambic senarius, or the 3rd or 11th position of a trochaic septenarius, where there can sometimes be either a hiatus or a brevis in longo, that is a short syllable where a long syllable is expected. This is fairly common in Plautus, but is not apparently found in Terence. The following examples are all from Plautus.

The locus Jacobsonianus resembles the 8th position of an iambic septenarius or iambic octonarius, where similarly there may be a hiatus or a brevis in longo preceded by a short element and followed by a pause (see below). In the same way, the anceps preceding a locus Jacobsohnianus is usually short.

==== With hiatus ====
Sometimes where there is a hiatus, there is also a change of speaker (this kind is sometimes found even in Terence):

edepol memoriā (e)s optumā. / – offae monent!

| uu – u – | – – u – | – – u – | ia6

"By Pollux, you have a good memory!" – "It's the dinners which prompt it!"

But in other instances there is no change of speaker:

vīdīsse crēdō mulierem / in aedibus. ia6

| – – u – | – uu u – | u – u – | ia6

"I believe I saw a woman in the house"

inter mortālīs ambulō / interdius

| – – – – | – – u – | – – u – | ia6

"I am walking among mortals in broad daylight"

==== With brevis in longo ====
In other examples there is no hiatus between the words, but there is a brevis in longo, that is, the word ends in a short syllable where metrically a long syllable is expected:

potuit: plūs iam sum līberă / quinquennium.

| uu – – – | – – u – | – – u – | ia6

"He was able: I have been free now for more than five years."

proin tū nē qu(ō) abeās longiŭs / ab aedibus.

| – – – uu | – – u – | u – u – | ia6

"So don't you go too far away from the house."

atque argentō comparandō fingerĕ / fallāciam.

| – – – – | – u – – | – u – – | – u – | tr7

"And to invent a trick for getting money."

cēteră / quae volumus ūtī, graecā mercāmur fidē

| – u – – | uu – – – | – – – – | – u – | tr7

"The other things which we wish to use, we buy with 'Greek faithfulness' (i.e. paying with promises)."

==== With tribrach ====
When the locus Jacobsohnianus is a short syllable followed by two other short syllables, making a tribrach, it is difficult to say whether there is a brevis in longo, or whether the element is split between two words, breaking Ritschl's law (Questa prefers the latter option):

quid 'bracchi(um)'? – illud dīcerĕ vŏlŭī femur

| – – u – | – – u –  | uu – u – | ia6
or:
| – – u – | – – u uu | u  – u – | ia6

"What, its foreleg?" – "I meant to say, its hind leg."

eru' meus elephantī coriō circumtentust, nōn suō,

| uu u – uu | – – uu – | – – – – | – u – | tr7
or:
| uu u uu u | – – uu – | – – – – | – u – | tr7

"My master is stretched over with the skin of an elephant, not his own."

==== With quasi-pyrrhics ====
There are certain instances where a quasi-pyrrhic word like ibī, mihī, nisī, malē comes at the locus Jocobsohnianus position apparently without its second vowel being shortened. Normally (except in cretic and bacchiac metres) such "quasi-pyrrhic" words are pronounced with the second syllable short, by brevis brevians. It is therefore unclear whether the long vowel is retained in such words, or whether they can be counted as instances of locus Jacobsohnianus:

ostendīt sēsē iam mihī medullitus.
"she has shown herself to me now from her soul"

| – – – – | – – u – | u – u – | ia6

In the following examples, there is the possibility of scanning with a tribrach (breaking Ritschl's law) rather than a locus Jacobsohnianus:

nimi' male timuī, priu' qu(am) intrō redi(ī); exanimātus fuī.

| uu u – uu | – uu – – | uu – uu – | – u – | tr7
| uu u uu u | – uu – – | uu – uu – | – u – | tr7 ?

"I was dreadfully afraid before I went indoors; I was practically dead".

hīc nisi dĕ opīniōne, certum nihil dīcō tibī. (tr7)

| – u – uu | – u – u | – – uu – | – u – | tr7
| – u uu u | – u – u | – – uu – | – u – | tr7 ?

"what I'm saying is just my opinion, I don't know for sure"

Because the following is in Terence, who seems not to use the locus Jacobsohnianus, Questa prefers to read nisi with a short -i, making a tribrach (u u u):

tū quantus quantu's nīl nisǐ săpǐentia (e)s

| – – – – | – – u – | uu – u – | ia6
| – – – – | – – u uu | u – u – | ia6 (preferred)

"You are from top to bottom nothing but wisdom"

== Iambic metres ==
=== Iambic senarius ===
Used for the prologues of plays and for the more serious speeches, the iambic senarius (ia6) is the most common metre in Roman comedy and is the only metre which was unaccompanied by music. It is more common in Terence than in Plautus.

The Latin line is based on the Greek comic iambic trimeter, which in turn is based on the more formal iambic trimeter of tragedy. The Greek tragic iambic trimeter goes as follows (in the notation used here, – is a long syllable, u a short one, and x an anceps, that is, either long or short):

| x – u – | x – u – | x – u – | (Greek)

The Latin equivalent of this is slightly different and has anceps syllables in place of the first and second shorts:

| x – x – | x – x – | x – u – | (Latin)

However, the various anceps syllables in the line are not equal. The following table shows the percentage of anceps positions in the iambic senarius which are short, long, or resolved. It is based on a count by J. J. Schlicher of the 533 iambic senarius lines in Plautus's Trinummus. As can be seen, apart from the 11th element, which is compulsorily short, a single short syllable is most commonly found in the 3rd and 7th positions in the line, i.e. the positions which are always short in Greek. The 9th element is the anceps position least likely to be represented by a single short syllable.

Resolution of an anceps element into two short syllables is most common in the 1st element of an iambic senarius line, very rare in the 5th.

Another feature that can be seen on this table is that the anceps elements in middle of the line (positions 3, 5, and 7) tend to be unaccented. Because of Meyer's law, it is rare for positions 3 or 7 to be accented unless they are short.

Anceps elements in ia6	1st element	3rd element	5th element	7th element	9th element	11th element
short (u)	13%	37%	23%	34%	10%	100%
long (–)	59%	51%	73%	56%	79%	0%
resolved (uu)	27%	12%	4%	10%	11%	0%
accented	26%	8%	7%	12%	32%	44%

In most (but not all) iambic senarii there is a word-break or caesura after the 5th element, corresponding to the dieresis after the 8th element in the trochaic septenarius. However, as can be seen from the examples below, there is often no break in the sense at this point. One result of this caesura is that the fourth element of the line usually coincides with the word-accent, while the third is unaccented.

In lines where there is no caesura after the fifth element there is one after the seventh (often combined with one after the 3rd element). An example is the fourth line of the Terence example below.

The iambic senarius is often used for exposition and explaining a situation, for example in the prologue of almost every play, such as Plautus's Amphitruo:

haec urbs est Thēb(ae). in illīsc(e) habitāt aedibus
Amphitruō, nātus Argīs ex Argō patre,
quīc(um) Alcumēna (e)st nūpt(a), Ēlectrī fīlia.
is nunc Amphitruō praefectust legiōnibus,
nam cum Tēloboīs bellum (e)st Thēbānō poplō.

| – –  – –  | u – – uu | –  – u – | ia6
| – uu – –  | u – – –  | –  – u – |
| – –  u –  | – – – –  | –  – u – |
| – –  – uu | – – – –  | uu – u – |
| – –  – uu | – – – –  | –  – u – |

"This city is Thebes. In that house lives
Amphitruo, born in Argos from an Argive father,
with whom Alcmena is married, daughter of Electer (Electryon).
This Amphitruo is now in command of the legions,
for the Theban people are having a war with the Teloboans."

The iambic senarius is also used for dialogue, especially when old men are speaking (6235 out of 7659 lines spoken by old men, that is more than 80% of their dialogue, are in this metre). An example is the following extract from Terence's Andria (35–39) spoken by the old man Simo to his freedman Sosia:

ego postquam t(ē) ēm(ī), ā parvol(ō) ut semper tibī
apud me iūst(a) et clēmēns fuerīt servitūs
scīs. fēc(ī) ex serv(ō) ut essēs lībertus mihī,
proptereā quod servībās līberāliter:
quod habuī summum pretium persolvī tibī.

| uu –  –  – | –  –  u  –  | –  –  u  – | ia6
| u  –  –  – | –  –  –  uu | –  –  u  – |
| –  –  –  – | u  –  –  –  | –  –  u  – |
| –  uu –  – | –  –  –  –  | u  –  u  – |
| u  uu –  – | –  uu –  –  | –  –  u  – |

"After I bought you, how from childhood onwards
your servitude with me was always just and mild
you know. From a slave I made you to be my freedman,
because you used to serve me generously.
I paid you the greatest price which I had."

=== Iambic septenarius ===
| x – x – | x – u – || x – x – | x – – |

The character of this metre is different from the iambic senarius or trochaic septenarius. In Plautus there almost always a break (diaeresis) in the middle of the line. Unless the diaeresis (central break) is omitted, then by Meyer's law there is always a short syllable in the penultimate place before the break. At the end of the line there is always a word accent on the penultimate element.

Although not so frequent as the senarius, the iambic septenarius (ia7) is also reasonably common in Roman comedy. Certain characters and plays use this metre more than others; in Plautus' Pseudolus, for example, there are only ten lines of iambic septenarii, occurring in sections of one or two lines, and in Amphitruo this metre does not occur at all. But in Rudens there are 204 lines (290–413, 682–705, 1281–1337), in Miles Gloriosus 211 (354–425, 874–946, 1216–1283), in Curculio 46 (487–532), and in Asinaria 322 (381–503, 545–745).

The iambic septenarius is sometimes known as the "laughing metre". A typical use is the light-hearted banter of the two cunning slaves, Leonida and Libanus, in Plautus's Asinaria, when ribbing each other. Here Leonida speaks:

Edepol virtūtēs quī tuās // nōn possīs conlaudāre
sīc ut egŏ possim, quae domī // duellīque male fēcistī.
nĕ ĭll(a) edepol prō meritō tuō // memorārī multa possunt
ubi fīdentem fraudāverīs, // ub(ĭ) er(ō) īnfidēlis fuerīs,
ubi verbīs conceptīs sciēns // libenter periūrārīs,
ubi parietēs perfōderīs, // in fūrt(ō) ubi sīs prehēnsus,
ubi saepe causam dīxerīs // pendēns adversus octō
artūtōs, audācīs virōs, // valentīs virgātōrēs!

| uu –  –  – | –  – u – || –  –  –  –  | –  –  – | ia7
| –  uu u  – | –  – u – || –  –  u  uu | –  –  – |
| –  uu –  – | uu – u – || uu –  –  –  | u  –  – |
| uu –  –  – | –  – u – || uu –  u  –  | –  uu – |
| uu –  –  – | –  – u – || u  –  –  –  | –  –  – |
| uu uu u  – | –  – u – || –  –  uu –  | u  –  – |
| uu –  u  – | –  – u – || –  –  –  –  | u  –  – |
| –  –  –  – | –  – u – || u  –  –  –  | –  –  – |

"By Pollux, you could not praise your own virtues
as well as I could, all those things which at home or in war you've done wrong!
Indeed, by Pollux, there are a lot of things that can be mentioned to your credit:
when you defrauded those who trusted you, when you were unfaithful to your master,
when you deliberately perjured yourself with invented words,
when you made holes in walls, when you were caught stealing,
and all the times you pleaded your case when hanging in front of eight
burly aggressive men, sturdy whippers!"

But the metre is also associated with love. In Miles the three scenes with iambic septenarii are all scenes where a courtesan is the protagonist, and there is similar use in other plays where a prostitute is acting or being discussed. In Terence's Eunuchus, iambic septenarii are used when the beautiful Pamphila first appears, and when her lover Chaerea comes out after raping her.

In Terence the metre is often used by love-struck young men, as in the following exchange (Heauton Timorumenos 679–89) between the young man Clinia and the cunning slave, Syrus:

CLI. ō mī Syr(e), audīst(ī) obsecrō? // SYR. quidnī? quǐ ŭsqu(e) ūn(ā) adfuerim.
CLI. quoi aequ(e) audīstī commodē // quicqu(am) ēvēnisse? SYR. nūllī!
CLI. atqu(e) ita mē dĭ ament ut egŏ nunc // nōn tam meāpte causā
laetōr qu(am) illīu'; qu(am) egŏ sci(ō) ess(e) // honōre quōvīs dignam.
SYR. ita crēdō. sed nunc, Clīniā, // age, dā tē mihĭ vicissim;
n(am) amīcī quoque rēs est vidend(a) // in tūt(um) ut conlocētur.

| –  –  u  –  | –  –  u  – || –  –  –  –  | –  uu – | ia7
| –  –  –  –  | –  –  u  – || –  –  –  –  | u  –  – |
| –  uu –  uu | –  uu u  – || –  –  u  –  | u  –  – |
| –  –  –  –  | u  uu u  – || u  –  u  –  | –  –  – |
| uu –  –  –  | –  –  u  – || uu –  –  uu | u  –  – |
| u  –  –  uu | –  –  u  – || –  –  –  –  | u  –  – |

CLI. O my Syrus, did you hear, do tell me! SYR. How could I not? I was there with you.
CLI. Have you ever heard anything turn out so well for anyone? SYR. No, no one!
CLI. And so may the gods love me, I am now delighted not so much for my own sake
as for hers, whom I know to be worthy of any honour.
SYR. I am sure you’re right. But now, Clinia, listen to me in turn;
for we must do something about your friend’s situation too to make sure it is secure.

In Plautus, there is usually a clean break between the two halves of the line, and this is often true of Terence too. However, sometimes Terence smooths over the break with an elision, or even omits the break altogether.

tū puerīs curre, Parmen(o), obvi(am) atqu(e) eis oner(a) adiūtā

| – uu – – | u – u – | u / – – uu | – – – |

You run to meet the boys, Parmeno, and help them with their loads.

=== Iambic octonarius ===
| x – x – | x – u – || x – x – | x – u – | type a[144]
| x – x – | x – x – |  x – x – | x – u – | type b

The iambic octonarius has two kinds, one with a break in the middle of the line, as the first pattern above. In this kind there is always a short syllable in position 7. But often, instead of a mid-line break, there is a caesura or word-break 7 elements before the end of the line. This second kind of iambic octonarius, which has a break after the 9th element, is very similar to a trochaic septenarius but with an extra syllable at the beginning, and in some passages (such as Terence, Phormio 465–504) the metre switches back and forth between tr7 and ia8.

Cicero quotes some lines from the tragedy Iliona by Pacuvius in which the ghost of Hector begs his mother to bury him:

neu reliquiās sēmēsās sierīs / dēnūdātīs ossibus
per terram saniē dēlibūtās / foedē dīvexārier

| – uu u – | – – – uu | – / – – – | – – u – | ia8
| – – – uu | – – u  – | – / – – – | – – u – |

"And do not allow my half-eaten remains, with denuded bones,
to be spread hideously across the ground smeared with gore"

Despite the fact that there are eight feet, Cicero comments: "I don't know why he is afraid, when he pours out such fine septenarii to the sound of the tibiae."

In the first type, when the break is in the middle of the line, there may be a hiatus or a brevis in longo (a short syllable standing for a long element) at that point, as in the word ingerĕ in the first of the two lines below:

tū qu(ī) urn(am) habēs, aqu(am) ingere; // face plēn(um) ahēnum sīt coquō;
tē cum secūrī, caudicālī praeficiō prōvinciae.

| – – u – | u – u – || uu  – u  – | – – u – | ia8
| – – u – | – – u – |  – / – uu – | – – u – |

"You who have the jar, bring in some water; make sure the pot is full for the cook;
you with the axe I'm putting in charge of the wood-cutting province."

The iambic octonarius was apparently often used in Roman tragedy for messenger speeches, and in Plautus it is also used by slave messengers, as in this account of the preparations of a battle in the Amphitruo (203–210) sung by the slave Sosia. In this section there is generally a word-break after the 8th element, and the 7th element is short:

prīncipi(ō) ut ill(ō) advēnimus, // ubi prīmum terram tetigimus,
continu(ō) Amphitruō dēlegīt // virōs prīmōrum prīncipēs;
eōs lēgāt, Tēloboīs iubēt // sententi(am) ut dīcant suam:
sī sine v(ī) et sine bellō velint // rapt(a) et raptōrēs trādere,
sī qu(ae) asportāssent redderent, // s(ē) exercit(um) extemplō domum
reductūr(um), abitūrōs agrō // Argīvōs, pāc(em) atqu(e) ōtium
dar(e) illīs; sīn aliter sient // animātī neque dent quae petāt,
sēs(ē) igitur summā vī virīs//qu(e) eōr(um) oppid(um) oppugnāssere.

| – uu u –  | –  – u – || uu – – –  | – uu u – | ia8 (type a)
| – uu – uu | –  – u – || u  – – –  | – –  u – |
| – –  – –  | uu – u – || –  – u –  | – –  u – |
| – uu – uu | –  – u – || –  – – –  | – –  u – |
| – uu – –  | –  – u – || –  – u –  | – –  u – |
| u –  – uu | –  – u – || –  – – –  | – –  u – |
| u –  – –  | uu – u – || uu – – uu | – –  u – |
| – uu – –  | –  – u – || –  – u –  | – –  u – |

"In the beginning, when we arrived there, as soon as we touched land,
immediately Amphitruo picks out some men, the leaders of the chiefs;
he delegates them and orders them to speak his judgement to the Teloboans:
if, without violence and without war, they were prepared to hand over what they had stolen and those who had stolen it,
if they gave back what they had carried off, he would immediately lead the army
back home, the Greeks would leave their territory, and give them
peace and leisure; but if they were otherwise minded, and didn't give what he was asking,
in that case with all his force and men he would attack their town."

However, in the account of the aftermath of the same battle in Plautus's Amphitruo (256–261) the style changes. In this section the lines run smoothly on, without any central dieresis. Frequently the 7th element is long. They do, however, mostly have a word-break after the 9th element, which makes the second half resemble the trochaic septenarius:

sed proeli(um) id tandem dirēmit / nox interventū suō.
postrīdi(ē) in castr(a) ex urb(e) ad nōs / veniunt flentēs prīncipēs:
vēlātīs manibus ōrant ignō/scāmus peccātum suom,
dēduntque sē, dīvīn(a) hūmānaqu(e) / omni(a), urb(em) et līberōs
in diciōn(em) atqu(e) in arbitrātum / cūnctī Thēbānō poplō.
post ob virtūt(em) er(ō) Amphitruō/nī / patera dōnāt(a) aurea (e)st,
quī Pterela pōtitāre solitus / est rēx. haec sīc dīc(am) erae.

| – –  u –  | – – u  –  | – / –  – – | – – u – | ia8 (type b)
| – –  u –  | – – –  –  | – / uu – – | – – u – | 
| – –  – uu | u – –  –  | –   –  – – | – – u – |
| – –  u –  | – – –  –  | u / –  u – | – – u – | 
| – uu – –  | u – u  –  | – / –  – – | – – u – |
| – –  – –  | u – uu –  | – / uu u – | – – u – |
| – uu u –  | u – u  uu | u / –  – – | – – u – |

"But finally night with its intervention ended the battle.
The next day into our camp from the city the chiefs came to us weeping;
with veiled hands they begged us to forgive their wrong-doing,
and they surrendered themselves, and all divine and human things, the city and their children
all for jurisdiction and judgment to the Theban people.
Afterwards on account of his courage my master Amphitruo was given a gold cup,
with which King Pterela used to drink. This is what I shall tell the mistress."

The iambic octonarius is used more often by Terence (885 lines) than by Plautus (382 lines). In Terence's Eunuchus, this metre is particularly associated with one of the two brothers, Chaerea, who has 88 lines in this metre. The following passage from Terence's Adelphoe ("The Brothers") is sung by another of two brothers, Ctesipho, as he enters the stage:

abs quīvīs homine, cum (e)st opus, // benefici(um) accipere gaudeās:
vēr(um) enimvēr(ō) id dēmum iuvāt, // sī, qu(em) aequum (e)st facer(e), is bene facit.
ō frāter frāter, quid egŏ nunc // tē laudem? satĭs certō sciō;
nunqu(am) ita magnificē quicquam dīc(am) id / virtūs quīn superēt tuā.
itaqu(e) ūn(am) hanc rem m(ē) habēre praeter / aliōs praecipu(am) arbitror,
frātr(em) hominī nēmin(ī) esse prīmār(um) / artium magi(s) prīncipem.

| –  –  – uu | u –  u – || uu  uu – uu | u  –  u – | ia8 (type a)
| –  uu – –  | – –  u – || –   –  – uu | –  uu u – |
| –  –  – –  | – uu u – || –   –  – uu | –  –  u – |
| –  uu – uu | – –  – – |  – / –  – –  | uu –  u – | ia8 (type b)
| uu –  – –  | u –  u – |  u / uu – –  | uu –  u – |
| –  uu – –  | u –  u – |  – / –  u –  | uu –  u – |

"From any man, when there's a need, you would be glad to receive a favour,
but in truth what is really nice is if someone does a favour who ought to do one.
O brother, brother, how can I praise you enough? One thing I know for sure,
I shall never be able to speak highly enough of your virtue.
And so I think I have this one thing above all more than anyone else,
that no man has a brother more endowed with the most excellent qualities!"

The style changes halfway through the above lines: in the first three lines there is a central dieresis, but in the second half the lines run on, and there is a word break after element 9.

== Trochaic metres ==
=== Trochaic septenarius ===
==== 1st type ====
| – x – x | – x – x || – x – x | – u – |

The second most common metre in Roman comedy in terms of lines (or the commonest, in terms of the number of words) is the trochaic septenarius (tr7). Like the other long iambic and trochaic lines, it is believed to have been chanted to the music of the tibiae (double pipes). There is usually a diaeresis in the centre of the line, and there may sometimes also be a hiatus (lack of elision) or brevis in longo (a short syllable made long by position) at this point. Trochaic lines generally start with a word which is stressed on the first syllable, making it clear that the line has a trochaic not an iambic rhythm.

According to an ancient metrical theory, the Greek version of this metre (trochaic tetrameter catalectic) was composed of an iambic trimeter with a cretic foot (– u –) added at the beginning. This seems to be true of the Latin trochaic septenarius too: the word break (dieresis or caesura) is in the same place seven elements before the end of the line, and Meyer's law and the locus Jacobsohnianus apply in the same way to both lines.

The trochaic septenarius is a more lively metre than the iambic senarius. It is the "vehicle for excited talk" (Lindsay 1922:282), unlike the senarius, which is the vehicle for quiet talk, often used by old men. A play will often end with a passage in trochaics. In Plautus there is also a strong tendency in trochaics for the word accent to coincide with the metrical ictus of the feet.

In the following passage the slave Sosia protests when the god Mercury, disguised as Sosia, prevents the real Sosia from entering his own house:

quid, malum, nōn sum egŏ servos // Amphitruōnis Sōsiā?
nōnn(e) hāc noctū nostra nāvis // hūc ex portū Persicō
vēnit, quae m(ē) advexit? nōnne // m(ē) hūc erus mīsit meus?
nōnn(e) egŏ nunc st(ō) ant(e) aedēs nostrās? // nōn mī (e)st lantern(a) in manū?
nōn loquŏr, nōn vigilō? nōnn(e) hic homō // modo mē pugnīs contudit?
fēcit, hercle, n(am) etiam miserō // nunc mihī mālae dolent.
quid igitur egŏ dubit(ō)? aut cūr nōn // intr(ō) e(ō) in nostram domum?

| –  u  –  – | uu u –  – || –  uu – – | – u – | tr7
| –  –  –  – | –  u –  – || –  –  – – | – u – |
| –  –  –  – | –  – –  u || –  u  – – | – u – |
| –  uu –  – | –  – –  – || –  –  – – | – u – |
| –  uu –  uu| –  – uu – || uu –  – – | – u – |
| –  u  –  u | uu – uu – || –  u  – – | – u – |
| uu u  uu u | uu – –  – || –  u  – – | – u – |

What, dammit, aren't I Amphitruo's slave Sosia?
Didn't our ship come here last night from the Persian port,
which brought me? Didn't my master send me here?
Am I not now standing in front of our house? Isn't there a lantern in my hand?
Am I not talking? Am I not awake? Didn't this man just punch me with his fists?
He did, by Hercules! Since my wretched jaw is still aching!
So what am I waiting for? Why don't I just go into our house?

In the centre of the trochaic septenarius line (corresponding to the caesura in the iambic senarius) there is usually a word-break, and in Plautus (though not in Terence) there is sometimes a hiatus (lack of elision) at this point, as in the second line below:

faciam quod iubēs; secūrim // capi(am) ancipit(em), atqu(e) hunc senem
osse fīnī dēdolābō // assulātim viscera.

| uu – – u | – u – – || uu – uu – | – u – | tr7
| –  u – – | – u – – || –  u –  – | – u – |

I'll do what you order; I'll get a two-bladed axe and I'll hack off
this old man's meat as far as his bones and chop his guts to pieces.

The same tendencies which apply to the alternating anceps syllables in an iambic senarius also apply in a similar way to a trochaic septenarius, namely that those elements that are always short in Greek (the 1st, 3rd, and 5th anceps syllables) are long in about 60% of lines; while those which are anceps in Greek (namely the 2nd, 4th and 6th anceps in the trochaic septenarius) are long in about 80% to 90% of lines. Meyer's Law and Luchs' Law also operate in the same places, counting from the end of the line backwards, as in the senarius.

==== 2nd type ====
Just as the type b iambic octonarius resembles a trochaic septenarius in having a break 7 elements before the end instead of 8, so there is also a trochaic septenarius which resembles a type a iambic octonarius by putting a break 8 elements before the end. In other words, it is the same as an iambic octonarius without the first element:

quis mē (e)st fortūnātiōr / venŭstātīqu(e) adeō plēniōr?
egōn prō hōc tē nūntiō / quī dōnem? quī? quī? nesci'ō.

  | – – – | – – u – || uu – – uu | – – u – | tr7
| u – – – | – – u – || –  – – –  | – – u – | ia8

"Who is more fortunate than me and more full of loveliness?
How, how am I to thank you for this news? I don't know how."

=== Trochaic octonarius ===
| – x – x | – x – x || – x – x | – x – – |

Much less frequent is the trochaic octonarius (tr8), which is found in both poets. It is mostly very sporadically used with just a line or two here or there in the midst of other metres. The following four-line stretch comes from Plautus' Pseudolus (161–164), where the pimp Ballio is giving instructions to three slaves:

tib(ī) hŏc praecipi(ō) ut niteant aedēs. // habĕs quod faciās: proper(ā), ab(ī) intrō.
tŭ ĕstō lectisterniātōr. // tŭ ǎrgent(um) ēluit(ō), īd(em) exstruitō.
haec, qu(om) eg(ō) ā forō revortar, // facit(e) ut offendam parāta,
vorsa sparsa, tersa strāta, // lautaqu(e) ūnctaqu(e) omni(a) ut sint!

| uu – uu – | uu – – – || uu – uu –  | uu u –  – |
| –  – –  – | –  u – – || –  – –  uu | –  – uu – |
| –  u –  u | –  u – – || uu u –  –  | –  u –  – |
| –  u –  u | –  u – u || –  u –  u  | –  u –  – |

"You, I'm instructing that the house should be sparkling clean. You've been told what to do; hurry up, go inside.
You, be couch-strewer. You, clean the silver and also set it out.
When I come back from the forum, make sure I find everything ready,
and that everything is turned, sprinkled, dusted, strewn, washed, and polished!"

In the above quotation there is a contrast between the anapaestic first two lines, where the double short syllables suggest bustle and hurry, and the last two lines, where the repeated trochaic rhythm emphasises how everything has got to be when it is ready. If Gratwick is right that the feet were not isometric, then the fourth line above, with a short syllable in each anceps position, must have taken less time to say than the first.

Sometimes both in this metre and in the trochaic septenarius the verses split into four equal parts, as in the last line above.

In Terence lines of trochaic octonarii (interspersed with trochaic septenarii) tend to occur in clusters at moments of great emotional intensity, such as at Hecyra 516–34.

A common pattern in both poets, but especially in Terence, is for trochaic octonarii to be followed first by one or two lines of trochaic septenarii, then by one or more iambic octonarii. This tr8-tr7-ia8 pattern occurs 48 times in Terence, and 6 times in Plautus.

== Polymetric iambo-trochaic passages ==
In the examples seen so far the same metre is used for several lines at a time; but a glance at Moore's database shows that iambic and trochaic lines are often mixed together, as in the passage below from Terence's Phormio (485–492), which Moore discusses in an article. In these lines the young man Phaedria pleads with the slave-owner Dorio for more time to raise the money to buy his girlfriend; Phaedria's cousin Antipho and the slave Geta secretly listen in on the conversation.

Here the iambic octonarius and iambic senarius are used when Dorio is denying Phaedria's request. When he seems willing to listen and the plot seems to be moving forward, the trochaic septenarius is used. The aside by the eavesdropping Antipho and his slave Geta (between dashes below) is in the distinctive iambic septenarius. It is possible that in the line with ia6 the music stopped altogether for a few moments:

PH. Dōriō,
aud(ī) obsecrō . . DO. nōn audiō! // PH. parumper . . DO. quīn omitte mē!
PH. audī quod dīc(am). DO. at enim taedēt // i(am) audīr(e) eadem mīliēns!
PH. at nunc dīcam quod lubenter // audiās. DO. loquer(e), audiō.
PH. nōn queŏ t(ē) exōrār(e) ut maneās // trīdu(om) hoc? – quō nunc abīs?
DO. mīrābar sī tū mihĭ quicqu(am) adferrēs nov(ī). – AN. ei!
metuō lēnōnem nēquid . . GE. suō suāt capit(ī)? id(em) egŏ vereōr! –
PH. nōn mihĭ crēdis? DO. hariolāre! // PH. sīn fidem dō? DO. fābulae!

| –  u  – |
| –  –  u  – | –  –  u  – || u  –  –  –  | u  –  u – | ia8
| –  –  –  – | uu –  –  – || –  –  uu –  | –  u  – | tr7
| –  –  –  – | –  u  –  – || –  u  –  uu | –  u  – | tr7
| –  uu –  – | –  –  uu – || –  u  –  –  | –  u  – | tr7
| –  –  –  – | –  uu –  – |  –  –  u  –  |           ia6
| uu –  –  – | –  –  –  – || u  –  uu uu | –  uu – | ia7
| –  uu –  – | uu u  –  u || –  u  –  –  | –  u  – | tr7

PH. Dorio!
Listen, I beg you! DO. I'm not listening! PH. Just a little! DO. No, let me go!
PH. Listen to what I'm saying. DO. But I'm tired of hearing the same things a thousand times!
PH. But now I'm going to say something which you'll want to hear. DO. Speak, I'm listening.
PH. Can’t I beg you to wait for these three days? – Where are you off to now!
DO. I was wondering if you were going to bring me anything new. – AN. (aside) O no!
I'm afraid in case the pimp… GE. Stitches up a plan in his head? I fear the same! –
PH. Don't you believe me? DO. You're raving! PH. But if I give a pledge? DO. Just stories!

== Anapaestic metres ==
Anapaestic metres are used frequently by Plautus (about 4.5% of all his lines), but are not found in Terence. They are based on the foot | uu – |; two feet make a metron or "dipody". The frequent substitution of dactyls (– uu), spondees (– –) or proceleusmatics (uu uu) for anapaests (uu –), and the frequent use of brevis breviāns and synizesis are typical of anapaestic metres.

Unlike in iambo-trochaic metres, the use of dactylic words such as omnibus (– u u) is allowed, and it is also not uncommon for a pair of short syllables to be split between different words, e.g. scīre putō, pūtid(e) amātōr, quīque futūrī, which doesn't happen in iambo-trochaic except when the first word is a monosyllable.

Anapaestic lines are usually based on the dimeter or quaternarius, that is a length of two metra, or four feet. According to the ancient grammarian Marius Victorinus, it is characteristic of anapaestic poetry that there is usually a word-break at the end of every metron or dipody; in Seneca's plays this is always the case. In Plautus it is mostly true, but there are exceptions.

In Greek anapaestic poetry it is generally assumed that the verse-ictus was heard on the second half of the foot. However, in Plautus, except in the second half of the anapaestic septenarius, the word-stress generally comes on the first half of each foot. For those scholars who believe there was no ictus in ancient poetry, this presents no problem; the fact that each metron usually ends with a word-break automatically means that the stress will be heard on the early part of the feet. But for those that support the idea of ictus, it does present a problem. As Lindsay puts it, "It seems difficult to believe that the same poet, who in other metres so successfully reconciles accent with ictus, should tolerate lines like:

Trin. 239: blandiloquentulus, harpagŏ, mendāx,
Bacch. 1088: stultī, stolidī, fatuī, fungī, bardī, blennī, buccōnēs,
Pers. 753: hostibus victīs, cīvibus salvīs, etc."

Other Roman writers who wrote anapaests, such as Seneca and Boethius, also regularly placed the word-accent on the beginning of each foot. Whether Roman poets wrote anapaests without regard for ictus, or whether the Roman anapaest differed from the Greek in that the ictus came on the beginning of each foot, as in the trochaic metre, is unclear. For this reason, the ictus has not been marked in the samples below. Some half lines (such as | u u – u u – | u u – – – |) are identical in the trochaic and the anapaestic metres; and the tendency to form "square" verses is another point in common with the trochaic metre.

=== Anapaestic septenarius ===
This metre is used only by Plautus. It is a catalectic metre in which the last foot is shortened to a single long element. The basic scheme is as follows:

| uu – uu – | uu – uu – || uu – uu – | uu – – |

The anapaestic foot | u u – | is frequently replaced by a spondee | – – | or a dactyl | – u u | and occasionally by a proceleusmatic | u u u u |. In the first half of the line, as in the anapaestic octonarius, the word-accent generally comes on the beginning of each foot. However, in the second half the stress tends to swing the other way, with the accent on the second half of each foot.

Apart from a long stretch of 82 lines in Miles Gloriosus, this metre is usually used sparingly, often with just a line or two mixed with other anapaestic metres. Frequently those who speak in this metre are old men or women. Here is a passage from the Bacchides (1160–65) where two old men, Nicobulus and Philoxenus, are talking:

NIC. sed quid ĭstuc est? etsī i(am) eg(o) ĭpsus // quid sīt probĕ scīre putō mē;
vēr(um) audīr(e) eti(am) ex tē studeō. // PHIL. Vidĕn hanc? NIC. vide(ō). PHIL. haud mală (e)st mulier.
NIC. pol vēr(o) ista mal(a) et tū nihilī. // PHIL. Quid mult(a)? eg(o) am(o). NIC. an amās? PHIL. nai gar. (ναὶ γάρ)
NIC. tūn, homŏ pūtid(e), amātōr istāc // fier(ī) aetāt(e) audēs? PHIL. quī nōn?
NIC. quia flāgitium (e)st. PHIL. quid opust verbīs? // meŏ fīliŏ nōn s(um) īrātus,
neque tē tuŏst aequ(om) ess(e) īrātum: // sĭ amant, sapienter faciunt.

| – uu – –  | –  – uu – || –  – uu –  | uu –  – | an7
| – –  – uu | –  – uu – || uu – uu –  | uu uu – |
| – –  – uu | –  – uu – || –  – uu uu | –  –  – |
| – uu – uu | –  – –  – || uu – –  –  | –  –  – |
| uu – uu – | uu – –  – || uu – uu –  | –  –  – |
| uu – uu – | –  – –  – || uu – uu –  | –  uu – |

NIC. "But what's the problem? Even though I myself think I already know full well what it is,
all the same I'm keen to hear it from you. PHIL. D'you see this girl? NIC. I do. PHIL. She's not a bad woman.
NIC. By Pollux, she is a bad one, and you're worthless! PHIL. In short, I'm in love. NIC. You're in love? PHIL. I am indeed.
NIC. You disgusting man, how dare you become a lover at your age! PHIL. Why not?
NIC. Because it's a scandal! PHIL. What need for words? I'm not angry with my son,
and it's not fair that you should be angry with yours. If they're in love, they are doing wisely."

The longest passage of anapaestic septenarii is Miles Gloriosus 1011–93. According to Moore there is a close resemblance between the metre in this passage and trochaic septenarii. The German classicist Marcus Deufert claims that the style of writing in these lines is different from the usual anapaests, in that it is more regular and there are more long syllables. He draws the conclusion that the lines from Miles Gloriosus were recited in the same way as trochaic septenarii, while other anapaestic passages (which usually contain an admixture of other metres) were sung. The passage starts as follows, with a conversation between the slave Palaestrio and the maidservant Milphīdippa, who pretends that she doesn't know that Palaestrio's master is standing listening. The passage starts with trochaic septenarius, the switches to anapaestic septenarius. If the two are compared, it can be seen that the first half of both metres is very similar, but the rhythm differs in the second half:

... // MIL. Utinam, cuius causā forās
s(um) ēgress(a), eius conveniundī // mihi potestās ēvenāt.
PAL. Erit, et tib(i) ĕxoptāt(um) optingēt, // bon(um) hab(ē) animum, nē formīdā;
homo quīdamst quī scīt, quod quaeris // ubi sīt. MIL. Quĕm eg(o) hīc audīvī?
PAL. Socium t(u)ōrum conciliōr(um) et // participem cōnsiliōrum.
MIL. Tum pol eg(o) id quod cēl(ō) hau cēl(ō). PAL. Imm(ō) // et cēlās et nōn cēlās.
MIL. Qu(ō) argūment(ō)? PAL. Īnfīdōs cēlās: // ego sum tibi firmē fīdus.

               ...     || uu –  –  – | –  u – | tr7
| –  – –  – | – uu – – || uu u  –  – | –  u – |
| uu – uu – | – –  – – || uu uu –  – | –  – – | an7
| uu – –  – | – –  – – || uu –  uu – | –  – – |
| uu – –  – | – uu – – || –  uu –  – | uu – – |
| – uu –  – | – –  – – || –  –  –  – | –  – – |
| –  – –  – | – –  – – || uu –  uu – | –  – – |

MIL. "I wish I had the opportunity of meeting the person on whose account I have come outside!"
PAL. "There will be an opportunity, and what you hope for will happen: be of good cheer, and don't worry!
There's a certain man who knows where it is, that thing you're looking for." MIL. "Who's that I heard here?"
PAL. "An ally in your councils and a sharer in your counsels!"
MIL. "In that case I won't hide what I'm hiding." PAL. "On the contrary, you're both hiding it and not hiding it!"
MIL. "How can that be?" PAL. "You're hiding it from people you can't trust, but I'm someone you can completely trust."

=== Anapaestic octonarius ===
| uu – uu – | uu – uu – || uu – uu – | uu – uu – |

Again, substitution of dactyl | – uu | or spondee | – – | or proceleusmatic | uu uu | for anapaest | uu – | is very common. As in a trochaic line, the word-accent usually comes on the first syllable of each foot, and unlike in the anapaestic septenarius, this is true of both halves of the line.

In the following extract from Plautus's Pseudolus (133–7), the pimp Ballio summons his slaves outside to give them instructions to prepare the house for his birthday:

exīt(e), agit(e) exīt(e), ignāvī! // male habit(ī) et male conciliātī,
quōrum numquam quicquam quoiquam // venit in ment(em) ut rēctē faciant,
quibus, nis(ī) ad hoc exempl(um) experior, // nōn potĕst ūsūr(a) ūsurpārī.
nequ(e) eg(o) hominēs magis asinōs numquam // vīd(ī), ita plāgīs costae callent:
quōs quom feriās, tibĭ plūs noceās; // e(ō) en(im) ingeni(ō) hī sunt flagritrībae.

| –  –  uu –  | –  – –  – || uu uu –  uu | – uu –  – | an8
| –  –  –  –  | –  – –  – || uu –  –  –  | – –  uu – |
| uu uu –  –  | –  – uu – || –  uu –  –  | – –  –  – |
| uu uu –  uu | uu – –  – || –  uu –  –  | – –  –  – |
| –  –  uu –  | uu – uu – || uu –  uu –  | – uu –  – |

"Come out, come on, come out, you lazy ones, worthless to own and a waste of money to buy,
To none of whom does it ever come into their mind to do the right thing;
and whom, unless I try this example (uses whip), it's impossible to get any work from them.
I've never seen any men more like donkeys, their ribs are so calloused with blows!
If you hit them you do yourself more harm than them, they're such whip-wearers-out by nature!"

After these five lines of anapaests, Ballio reverts to a mixture of trochaic and iambic lines for the rest of his speech.

In the following passage from Plautus's Rudens (220–228), five lines of anapaestic octonarii are followed by four of anapaestic septenarii. In this scene Ampelisca, a slave girl who has survived a shipwreck, is looking for her fellow slave Palaestra. The five octonarii go as follows:

quid mihi meliust, quid magis in remst, // qu(am) ā corpore vīt(am) ut sēclūdam?
ita male vīv(ō) atqu(e) ita mihi mult(ae) in // pectore sunt cūr(ae) exanimālēs.
ita rēs sĕ habent: vīt(ae) hau parcō, // perdidĭ spem quā m(ē) oblectābam.
omnia iam circumcursāv(ī) atqu(e) // omnibu(s) latebrīs perreptāvī
quaerere conservam, vōc(e) oculīs // auribus ut pervestīgārem.

| –  uu uu – | –  uu –  – || – –  uu – | – –  – – | an8
| uu uu –  – | uu uu –  – || – uu –  – | – uu – – |
| uu –  uu – | –  –  –  – || – uu –  – | – –  – – |
| –  uu –  – | –  –  –  – || – uu uu – | – –  – – |
| –  uu –  – | –  –  uu – || – uu –  – | – –  – – |

"What is better for me, what better solution is there, than to separate my life from my body?
I am living so badly and there are so many depressing anxieties in my heart.
This is how things are: I don't care for life; I have lost the hope with which I used to comfort myself.
I have now run round everywhere and crept through all the hiding places
looking for my fellow slave, so that I can search her out with voice, eyes, and ears.

=== Anapaestic quaternarius ===
The anapaestic quaternarius is found in 152 lines, all in Plautus, mostly just one or two lines at a time. However, in Rudens (955–962) there are 13 anapaestic quaternarii, followed by a catalectic one. The passage begins as follows. It is a dialogue between two slaves, Trachalio and Gripus. Trachalio begins:

fūrt(um) ego vīdī / quī faciēbāt;
nōveram domin(um), id / quoi fīēbāt.
post ad fūr(em) / egomet dēveniō
feroqu(e) ei condiciōn(em) hōc pāctō:
"eg(o) istuc fūrtum / scio quoi factum (e)st;
nunc mihi sī vīs / dare dīmidium,
indicium dominō nōn faciam."

| –  uu –  –  | –  uu –  – | an4
| –  uu uu –  | –  –  –  – |
| –  –  –  uu | –  –  uu – |
| uu –  –  uu | –  –  –  – |
| uu –  –  –  | uu –  –  – |
| –  uu –  –  | uu –  uu – |
| –  uu –  uu | –  –  uu – |

I saw someone who was committing a theft;
I knew the master against whom it was being committed.
Afterwards I myself approach the thief
And I make a bargain with him on this condition:
"I know the person this theft has been done to;
Now if you are willing to give me half,
I won't say anything about it to the master."

In most lines there is a word-break between the two halves of the line, but not in all. In this Plautus differs from Seneca, who always puts a word-break at the end of each anapaestic metron.

=== Anapaestic systems ===
Anapaestic metra are often used in a long series or "system" where the division into lines is not always clear and may sometimes differ in different manuscript copies. Usually, however, the metra come in pairs, and in Plautus there is usually a word break at the end of the pair, but not always in the middle.

An example is the following from the Bacchides, where the old man Nicobulus, realising he has been tricked out of a large sum of money by the cunning slave Chrysalus, comes on stage and sings as follows (the first two lines are anapaestic septenarii):

quīcomqu(e) ub(i) ubī sunt, quī f(u)ērunt, // quīque futūrī sunt posthāc
stultī, stolidī, fatuī, fungī, // bardī, blennī, buccōnēs,
sōlus eg(ō) omnīs long(ē) antideō
stultiti(ā) et mōribus indoctīs.
periī, pudĕt: hoc(c)ine m(ē) aetātis
lūdōs bis fact(um) ess(e) indignē?
magi(s) qu(am) id reputō, tam magis ūror
quae meu(s) fīliu(s) turbāvit.
perditu(s) s(um) atqu(e) ērādīcātus s(um),
omnibus exemplīs excrucior.
omnia mē mala consectantur,
omnibus exitiīs interiī.

| –  –  uu –  | –  –  –  – || – uu – – | – – – ||
| –  –  uu –  | uu –  –  – || – –  – – | – – – ||
| –  uu –  –  | –  –  uu – |
| –  uu –  –  | uu –  –  – |
| uu –  uu –  | uu –  –  – |
| –  –  –  –  | –  –  –  – |
| uu –  uu –  | –  uu –  – |
| –  uu –  uu | –  –  – ||
| –  uu –  –  | –  –  –  – |
| –  uu –  –  | –  –  uu – |
| –  uu –  uu | –  –  –  – |
| –  uu –  uu | –  –  uu – |

Of all that there are anywhere, ever have been, and ever will be in future
stupid people, idiots, nitwits, blockheads, fools, nincompoops and dolts,
I alone surpass them all by a long way
in stupidity and uneducated behaviour.
I'm done for! I'm ashamed! At my age
to have been twice made a fool of so unworthily!
The more I think about it, the more I'm furious
about the confusion my son has caused!
I'm lost! I'm torn up by the root,
I'm tortured in every possible way!
Every evil is catching up with me,
I've died by every kind of death!

Since the short lines above come in couplets, some editors such as Lindsay (Oxford Classical Text) write them as single long lines of octonarii or septenarii.

== Bacchiac and cretic metres ==
The bacchiac (x – –) and cretic (– x –) metres (together with anapaests) are used in polymetric cantica (songs). They are mostly found in Plautus and are rare in Terence, who has only 4 lines of bacchiacs (Andria 481–84) and 15 of cretics (Andria 625–38, Adelphi 610–17); whereas Plautus has 530 lines of bacchiacs and 528 lines of cretics.

According to Eduard Fraenkel these two metres are "incomparably suited to the Latin language". They differ from anapaests in that popular pronunciations such as brevis breviāns and synizesis are avoided. The bacchiac is, however, very rare in Greek.

A law called Spengel and Meyer's law (similar to Meyer's law in the iambic senarius) applies to bacchiacs and cretics, namely that a polysyllabic word may not end on the 5th or 11th element of a bacchiac or on the 3rd or 9th element of a cretic unless the preceding anceps is short. To put it more simply, the elements marked x in bold in the patterns below cannot be both long and stressed:

| x – – | x – – | x – – | x – – | (bacchiac)
| – x – | – u – || – x – | – u – | (cretic)

In bacchiacs the word-accent quite often comes after the short syllable (ecastor sin' omnī: u – – u – –), rather than before it, as it tends to with cretics (maximā cōpiā: – u – – u –); some editors, therefore, mark these elements as an ictus.

=== Bacchiac quaternarius ===
Bacchiacs may occur in various lengths, but by far the most common is the bacchiac quaternarius (ba4), with four feet (occurring in 427 lines). Sometimes either the first or the second half of a quaternarius is replaced by a bacchiac colon (bacol), which is a sequence of the form either | x – – x – | or | x – x – – |. According to Moore's database, ba2bacol occurs in 62 lines, bacolba2 in 20 lines, bacolbacol in 14 lines, bacol by itself in 10 lines.

| x – – | x – – | x – – | x – – |

The usual form of the foot is | u – – | or | – – – |, but variations such as | u – uu | and | uu – – | are also found. Sometimes other similar metres are mixed in. There is generally no word break (diaeresis) in the middle of the line.

The bacchiac is used both for humorous songs and for tragic. Often the metre is sung by women. In the following passage from the Bacchides (1131–1140a) the courtesan Bacchis and her sister mock the two old men Philoxenus and Nicobulus who have knocked on their door, calling them "sheep":

SOR. ecastor sin(e) omn(ī) arbitrōr malitiā (e)sse.
PHIL. merit(ō) hoc nōbīs fīt, quī quid(em) hūc vēnerīmus!
BACCH. cogantur quid(em) intr(ō). SOR. haud sciō quid e(ō) opus sīt,
quae nec lact' nec lān(am) ūll(am) habent. sīc sin(e) astent.
exsolvēre quantī fuēr(e), omni(s) frūctus
i(am) illīs dēcidit. nōn vidēs, ut pālantēs
sōlae līberae
grassentur? quīn aetāte crēd(ō) esse mūtās:
nē bālant quidem, qu(om) ā pecū cēter(ō) absunt.
stult(ae) atqu(e) haud malae videntur!
SOR. revortāmur intrō, sorōr. – NIC. īlic(ō) ambae
manēt(e)! haec ovēs volunt vōs.

| u  – – | u – – | u – uu | u – – | ba4
| uu – – | – – – | u – –  | u – – |
| –  – – | u – – | u – uu | u – – |
| –  – – | – – – | u – –  | u – – |
| –  – – | u – – | u – –  | – – – |
| –  – – | u – – | u – –  | – – – |
| –  – – | u – | bacol
| –  – – | – – – | u – –  | u – – | ba4
| –  – – | u – – | u – –  | u – – |
| –  – – | u –   | u – –  | bacolba1 (or ba1bacol)
| u  – – | u – – | u – –  | u – – | ba4
| u  – – | u –   | u – –  | bacolba1 (or ba1bacol)

SISTER. By Castor, I think they're perfectly harmless.
PHIL. (aside) We deserve this, since we have come here!
BACCHIS. Let them be driven inside. SIS. I don't know what use that would be,
since they have neither milk nor wool. Let them stand outside.
They've paid all they were worth. All their fruit
has already fallen from them. Don't you see how, they're straggling
and walking about freely
on their own? No, I think they're silent because of their age;
they don't even bleat, even though they're away from the rest of the flock!
They seem stupid and not bad!
SIS. Let's go back inside, sister. – NIC. Wait right there,
both of you! These sheep want you!

The tenth and twelfth lines above illustrate the "syncopated" bacchiac rhythm, where one syllable is omitted from the foot. When this happens, there is generally a word-break after the syncopated foot.

=== Bacchiac senarius ===
Bacchiac rhythms can also be used for serious, contemplative songs, such as Alcumena's lament on the sudden departure of her husband in Plautus's Amphitruo 633ff, which begins:

satin parva rēs est voluptāt(um) in vīt(ā) atqu(e) in aetāt(e) agundā
praequam quod molestum (e)st? ita quoiqu' comparātum (e)st
in aetāt(e) hominum;
ita dīs est placitum,
voluptāt(em) ut maerōr comes cōnsequātur:
quīn incommodī plūs malīqu(e) īlic(ō) adsīt, bonī s(ī) optigit quid.

| u  – – u – – || u  – – – – – || u – – u – – | ba6
| –  – – u – – || uu – – u – – | ba4
| u  – – uu – | colreiz
| uu – – uu – | colreiz
| u  – – – – – || u  – – u – – | ba4
| –  – – u – – || u  – – u – – || u – – u – – | ba6

Is it not the case that the amount of pleasure in life and in leading our existence is small
in comparison to what is disagreeable? So it has been allotted in each person's life.
So it has pleased the gods, that sadness should follow pleasure as her companion;
On the contrary, that more unpleasantness and evil should immediately follow, if anything nice happens.

In the above quotation there is always a word-break at the end of each metron, so that there is usually a word-stress on the penultimate element of each metron.

This particular metre (the bacchiac senarius) is very rare, occurring only in this passage. The words in aetāt(e) hominum are analysed by Questa as a colon reizianum, rather than a bacchiac with a hiatus after aetate.

=== Cretic quaternarius ===
Cretic metres are found in lengths of one to seven feet, but by far the most common cretic metre is the quaternarius, consisting of four feet. This occurs in 296 lines of Plautus and 9 lines of Terence:

| – x – | – u – || – x – | – u – |

The cretic metre consists of feet usually of the form | – x – |, although occasionally | uu u – | or | – u uu | can be found. Occasionally, as in lines 5 and 6 of the extract below, feet of other metres are mixed in, such as trochaic. In the quaternarius, there is usually a diaeresis (break) in the middle of the line, although elision may also be found at this point.

The cretic metre seems to have a more epic or tragic quality than the bacchiac. In the following passage, after a long description of preparations for a battle in stately iambic octonarii, the slave Sosia suddenly breaks into cretic quaternarii to describe the excitement of the battle itself (Amphitruo 219–247). The cretic passage begins as follows (note that the fourth and fifth lines contain trochaic elements):

postqu(am) utrimqu(e) exitum (e)st maximā cōpiā,
dispertītī virī, dispertīt(ī) ōrdinēs,
nōs nostrās mōre nostr(ō) et mod(o) īnstruximus
legiōnēs, it(em) hostēs contrā legiōnēs suăs īnstruont. (tr7)
deind(e) utrīqu(e) imperātōrēs in medi(um) exeunt, (cr2+tr2)
extrā turb(am) ōrdinum colloquontur simul.

| –  u – | – u – || – u – | – u – | 
| –  – – | – u – || – – – | – u – |
| –  – – | – u – || – u – | – u – |
| uu – – u | – – – – || uu – – uu | – u – | (tr7)
| –  u – | – u – | – – – uu | – u – | (cr2 + tr2)
| –  – – | – u – || – u – | – u – |

A line with both resolutions (uu u – and – u uu) is Amphitruo 235:

dēniqu(e), ut voluimus, nostra superāt manus

| – u – | uu u – || – u uu | – u – |

"Finally, as we wanted, our army is winning."

The same metre was also used in Roman tragedies, as in the following quotation from Ennius's Andromacha, cited more than once by Cicero:

quid petam praesid(i) aut exequār? quōve nunc
auxiliō exilī aut fugae frēta sim?
arc(e) et urb(e) orba sum. qu(ō) accidam? qu(ō) applicem?

| – u  – | – u – || – u – | – u – |
| – uu – | – u – || – u – | – u – |
| – u  – | – u – || – u – | – u – |

"What protection am I to seek or request? What help
may I depend on now in my exile or flight?
I am deprived of citadel and city. Who am I to approach? To whom may have recourse?"

The above tragic aria was presumably sung at a slow tempo. At other times, however, the cretic metre indicates a faster tempo than the iambics it follows, as with the battle description above, or the scene discussed by Moore (p. 332) from Plautus's Pseudolus 920ff, where Pseudolus tries to get Simia to speed up his walking, by changing from iambics to cretics:

P. ambul(ā) ergō cit(ō). S. imm(ō) ōtiōsē volō!

| – u – | – u – || – u – | – u – |

P. Walk quickly therefore. S. No, I want to go at a leisurely pace!

Two lines later Simio changes the metre back into iambics to slow the pace:

S. quid properās? placidē, nē timē!

| – uu – uu | – – u – |

S. Why are you hurrying? Slowly, don't be afraid!

=== Cretic colon and thymelicus ===
Often the first or the second half or both halves of a cretic quaternarius is replaced by a cretic colon (crcol), which is a sequence | – u – x – | or | – x – u – |. Cr2crcol occurs in 95 lines in the two poets, crcolcrcol in 26 lines, and crcolcr2 in 16 lines. Crcol by itself occurs in 19 lines.

Another possible ending for a cretic line is | – u u u – |, known as a thymelicus. The latter is almost always used for comic effect. Cr2thy occurs in 19 lines.

The following is sung by an old man called Simo in Plautus's Mostellaria (690–699):

melius ann(ō) hōc mihī nōn fuīt domī,
nec quod ūn(a) esca mē iūverit magis.
prandi(um) uxōr mihī perbonum dedīt,
nunc dormītum iubēt m(ē) īre: minimē!
nōn mihī forte vīs(um) īlicō fuīt,
melius quom prandium quam solēt dedīt:
voluit in cubicul(um) abdūcere m(ē) anus.
nōn bonust somnu(s) dē prandi(ō). apage!
clancul(um) ex aedibus m(ē) ēdidī forās.
tōta turgēt mih(ī) uxōr, sciō, domī.

| uu u – | –  u – | – u – u – | cr2crcol
| –  u – | –  u – | – u – u – | cr2crcol
| –  u – | –  u – | – u – u – | cr2crcol
| –  – – | –  u – | – u u u – | cr2thy
| –  u – | –  u – | – u – u – | cr2crcol
| uu u – | uu u – | – u u u – | cr2thy
| –  u – | –  u – | – u u u – | cr2thy
| –  u – | –  u – | – u – u – | cr2crcol
| –  u – | –  u – | – u – u – | cr2crcol (or with ''scio'', cr2thy)

Nothing was better at my house this year than this,
nor any food which pleased me more!
My wife has given me an excellent lunch.
But now she's ordering me to go to bed with her. No way!
By chance I didn't notice at the time
when she gave me a better lunch than usual.
The old woman wanted to take me off into the bedroom.
But sleep after lunch isn't good. Be off with you!
Secretly I slipped out of the house.
My wife is completely angry with me in the house, I know!

== Colon reizianum ==
The following metres used mainly by Plautus may also be mentioned.

The colon reizianum, named after the 18th-century classicist Friedrich Reiz /raɪts/ (1733–90) of Leipzig University, is a short piece of iambic metre of the following form:

| x – x – – |

The first anceps is almost always long; any of the first four elements (especially the first and third) can be replaced by two short syllables. Sometimes the colon reizianum is used on its own (e.g. Casina 721–28), but more often as the second half of a line in another metre, especially the versus reizianus (see below).

The versus reizianus (reiz) consists of an iambic quaternarius followed by a colon reizianum. But the iambic dimeter is unusual in that it usually begins with a double short syllable, which gives it a certain vigour:

| uu – x – | x – u – || x – x – – |

Another feature of the versus reizianus is that instead of a caesura after the fifth element (as is usual in an ia7), there is usually one after the fourth element.

Usually the versus reizianus is used singly or as a couplet in the midst of other metres, but there is one long stretch of 32 lines in Aulularia (415–446) entirely in this metre. In the following extract, the miserly old man Euclio has just chased the hired cook Congrio out of his house:

EVC. Redi. quō fugis nunc? tene, tenē. – CON. Quid, stolide, clāmās?
EVC. Qui(a) ad trīs virōs i(am) ego dēferam nōmen tuom. CON. Qu(am) ob rem?
EVC. Quia cultr(um) habēs. – CON. Cocum decēt. – EVC. Quid comminātu's
mihi? – CON. Istuc male fact(um) arbitrōr, quia nōn latu(s) fōdī!
EVC. Homo nūllust tē scelestiōr quī vīvāt hodiē,
neque qu(oi) ego dĕ ĭndustri(ā) amplius male plūs libĕns faxim.
CON. Pol ĕtsī taceās, pal(am) id quidem (e)st: rēs ipsa testīst:
ita fustibus sum molliōr magi(s) qu(am) ūllu(s) cinaedus!

| uu –  u –  | –  uu u – || –  uu u  –  – | 
| uu –  u –  | uu –  u – || –  –  uu –  – |
| uu –  u –  | u  –  u – || –  –  u  –  – |
| uu –  – uu | –  –  u – || uu –  uu –  – |
| uu –  – –  | u  –  u – || –  –  –  uu – |
| uu uu – –  | u  –  u – || uu –  uu –  – |
| uu –  uu – | u  –  u – || –  –  u  –  – |
| uu –  u –  | –  –  u – || uu –  uu –  – |

EUC. Come back! Where are you running away to? CON. Why are you shouting, you idiot?
EUC. Because I'm going now to report your name to the magistrates! CON. What for?
EUC. Because you have a knife! CON. That's normal for a cook! EUC. Why did you threaten
me? CON. I think it's a pity I didn't go further and stab you in the ribs!
EUC. No man alive today is more criminal than you,
nor is there any that I'd rather do harm to on purpose!
CON. By Pollux, even if you were to say nothing, it's evident. The thing itself is witness!
I've been so beaten by your sticks that I'm softer than a poofter!

== Wilamowitzianus ==
The wilamowitzianus (wil), named after the German classicist Ulrich von Wilamowitz-Moellendorff, is a short line of the following shape, ending in a choriamb (note that the two anceps syllables are never both short):

| – x x – | – u u – |

It is used in about 51 lines of Plautus and 5 of Terence, as in the following exchange from Bacchides between the two young men Pistoclerus and Mnesilochus:

PIS. Mnēsiloche, quid fīt? MN. Periī!
PIS. Dī meliu(s) faciant. MN. Periī!
PIS. Nōn tacĕs, īnsipiēns? MN. Taceam?
PIS. Sānu(s) sati(s) nōn es. MN. Periī!
multa mala m(i) in pectore nunc
ācri(a) ătqu(e) acerb(a) ēveniunt.
crīminīn m(ē) habuisse fidem!
immeritō tib(i) ĭrātu(s) fuī.

| – uu u –  | – u u – |
| – uu u uu | – u u – |
| – uu – uu | – u u – |
| – uu u –  | – u u – |
| – uu u –  | – u u – |
| – uu u –  | – u u – |
| – u  – uu | – u u – |
| – uu – uu | – u u – |

PIS. Mnesilochus, what's the matter? MN. I'm done for!
PIS. May the gods make it better. MN I'm done for!
PIS. Won't you be quiet, you fool? MN. Be quiet?
PIS. You're not right in the head. MN. I'm done for!
There are so many harsh and bitter evils now arising in my heart!
That I could have trusted that accusation! I was angry with you for no reason!

Sometimes a wilamowitzianus is followed by a colon (part line) in cretic metre, as the following exchange between the fisherman Gripus and the slave Trachalio in Plautus's Rudens:

GRI. sī fidem modo dās mihi tē nōn for(e) īnfīdum
TRA. dō fidem tibi, fīdus erō quisquis es. GRI. audī

| – u – uu | – u u – || – u – | – – |
| – u – uu | – u u – || – u – | – – |

GRI. If you give a pledge to me that you will not be unfaithful.
TRA. I give you my pledge, I will be faithful, whoever you are. GRI. Listen...

== Bibliography ==
- Barsby, John (ed.) (1999). Terence: Eunuchus. Cambridge University Press.
- Beare, W. (1953). "The Meaning of Ictus as applied to Latin Verse". Hermathena, No. 81 (May 1953), pp. 29–40.
- Benferhat, Yasmina (2007) Review of Kruschwitz et al, (eds) Terentius Poeta, Bryn Mawr Classical Review.
- Ceccarelli, L. (1988). La norma di Meyer nei versi giambici e trocaici di Plauto e Terenzio. Rome
- Clackson, James (2012) (ed.). A Companion to the Latin Language. Wiley-Blackwell.
- Danckaert, L. (2013). "Magis rythmus quam metron" (draft article for Symbolae Osloenses)
- de Melo, Wolfgang D.C. (2007) Review of Cesare Questa, La metrica di Plauto e di Terenzio. Urbino 2007. Bryn Mawr Classical Review, 2007.12.21
- de Melo, Wolfgang D.C. (ed.) (2011). Plautus: Amphitryon etc. Loeb Classical Library.
- Exon, Charles (1906). "The Relation of the Resolved Arsis and Resolved Thesis in Plautus to the Prose Accent". The Classical Review Vol. 20, No. 1, pp. 31–36.
- Fattori, Marco (2021). "What are we talking about when we talk about ‘iambic shortening’?". Linguistic Studies and Essays 59(2) 2021: 97–132. (Pre-publication copy: )
- Fontaine, M.; Scafuro, A.C. (eds.) (2014). The Oxford Handbook of Greek and Roman Comedy. OUP.
- Fortson, Benjamin W. (2008). Language and Rhythm in Plautus: Synchronic and Diachronic Studies.
- Fortson, Benjamin W. (2012). "Latin Prosody and Metrics". In Clackson (2012), pp. 92–104.
- Gellar-Goad, T.H.M. (2014) Review of Moore (2012) Music in Roman Comedy Bryn Mawr Classical Review.
- Gratwick, A.S. (1982). "The Origins of Roman Drama". Chapter 5 of E.J. Kenny (ed.) The Cambridge History of Classical Literature, vol. 2, part 1, pp. 77–137.
- Gratwick, A.S. (1993). Plautus: Menaechmi. Cambridge University Press.
- Gratwick, A.S. (2009). "Meyer's Law" (Review of Lucio Ceccarelli (1988): La norma di Meyer nei versi giambici e trocaici di Plauto e Terenzio). The Classical Review.
- Groton, A.H. (1995). Review of Gratwick (1993) Plautus: Menaechmi. Bryn Mawr Classical Review.
- Karakasis, Evangelos (2003). "A Note on Terentian Metre". Materiali e discussioni per l'analisi dei testi classici, No. 50 (2003), pp. 169–183.
- Laidlaw, W.A. (1936). "Jacobsohn's Law of Plautine Scansion". The Classical Quarterly, Vol. 30, No. 2 (Apr 1936), pp. 33–39.
- Lindsay, W.M. (1893). "The Shortening of Long Syllables in Plautus". The Journal of Philology, Vol. 22, Is. 44, (Jan 1, 1893): 1.
- Lindsay, W.M. (1894). The Latin Language. Oxford.
- Lindsay, W.M. (1900). The Captivi of Plautus.
- Lindsay, W.M. (1922). Early Latin Verse. Oxford.
- Moore, Timothy J. (2007). Terence as Musical Innovator in Peter Kruschwitz, Widu-Wolfgang Ehlers, Fritz Felgentreu (eds). Terentius Poeta.
- Moore, Timothy J. (2012a), Music in Roman Comedy. Cambridge University Press. ISBN 9781107006485.
- Moore, Timothy J. (2012b). "Don’t Skip the Meter! Introducing Students to the Music of Roman Comedy," Classical Journal 108 (2012/13) 218–234.
- Mountford, J.F. (1970), article "Metre, Latin", in N.G.L. Hammond, H.H. Scullard (eds) The Oxford Classical Dictionary, 2nd edition.
- Pearson, Lionel (1990). Aristoxenus: Elementa Rhythmica. (Oxford )
- Questa, Cesare (2007). La Metrica di Plauto e Terenzio (2007). Urbino: Quattro Venti.
- Radford, Robert S. (1926) Review of: Early Latin Verse by W. M. Lindsay. Classical Philology Vol. 21, No. 4 (Oct 1926), pp. 367–372.
- Raven, D. S. (1965). Latin Metre: An Introduction. Routledge.
- Schlicher, J. J. (1902). "Word-Accent in Early Latin Verse." The American Journal of Philology, Vol. 23, No. 1 (1902), pp. 46–67.
- Sonnenschein, E.A. (1929). "Ictus and Accent in Early Latin Dramatic Verse". The Classical Quarterly, Vol. 23, No. 2 (Apr 1929), pp. 80–86.
- Stroh, Wilfried (1990). "Arsis und Thesis oder: wie hat man lateinische Verse gesprochen?" In: Michael von Albrecht, Werner Schubert (Hrsg.): Musik und Dichtung. Neue Forschungsbeiträge. Viktor Pöschl zum 80. Geburtstag gewidmet (= Quellen und Studien zur Musikgeschichte von der Antike bis in die Gegenwart 23). Lang, Frankfurt am Main u. a., ISBN 3-631-41858-2, pp. 87–116.
- Sturtevant, E.H. (1919). "The Coincidence of Accent and Ictus in Plautus and Terence". Classical Philology, Vol. 14, No. 3 (Jul 1919), pp. 234–244.
- Sturtevant, E.H. (1929). Reviewed Work(s): Iktus und Akzent im Lateinischen Sprechvers by Eduard Fraenkel. The American Journal of Philology, Vol. 50, No. 1 (1929), pp. 95–99.
- Traill, Ariana (2009). Review of Fortson (2008). Bryn Mawr Classical Review.
