= Lidiano Bacchielli =

Italian archaeologist (1947–1996)

Lidiano Bacchielli (30 July 1947 in Urbino – 8 June 1996 in Milan) was an Italian archaeologist, specializing in the ancient north African region of Cyrenaica. He studied under the noted scholar Sandro Stucchi at the University of Urbino, working with him on archaeological digs in Libya and eventually succeeding Stucchi as the head of the Italian mission in Cyrenaica. Bacchielli taught classical archaeology at Rome (La Sapienza) and at Urbino. He is notable for furthering knowledge of Cyrene's art, architecture and town planning. Alongside numerous scholarly publications, he also wrote for a wider public. His best known popular work was titled Libya: The Lost Cities of the Roman Empire, co-written with fellow archaeologists Antonino Di Vita and Ginette Di Vita-Evrard.

An issue of the scholarly journal Quaderni di archeologia della Libia was dedicated to his memory in 2003.
