= Urbino European Law Seminar =

Annual summer course in European Law

The Urbino European Law Seminar is a summer course organized every year since 1959 by the Center for European Legal Studies of Urbino. The lectures are held in French, Italian and English at the law faculty of Urbino University, by visiting lecturers from many European countries and focus on current issues of European law, private international law, comparative law and Italian law.

Following the seminar, participants are given a certificate as proof of their attendance. Depending on the specialty selected and if successful in examination, participants are also awarded a diploma from the law faculty of Urbino University in either comparative law, European studies, advanced studies in European Law, or advanced European studies.

== History ==
The Urbino European Law Seminar was inaugurated on the 24 August 1959 by Henri Batiffol, Phocion Francescakis, Alessandro Migliazza, Francesco Capotorti, Enrico Paleari and Germain Bruillard. Until 2004, Cino and Simone Del Duca were the seminar's main benefactors. Since 2009, the teachers and researchers of the Center for European Legal Studies of Urbino, members of the Galileo Group, receive funding from the scientific cooperation initiative between France and Italy named Galileo.

== Teaching staff ==
Since the creation of the seminar, a significant proportion of the lectures have been given by professors who have also been guest lecturers at the Hague Academy of International Law : Riccardo Monaco (The Hague 1949, 1960, 1968, 1977), Piero Ziccardi (1958, 1976), Henri Batiffol (1959, 1967, 1973), Yvon Loussouarn (1959, 1973), Mario Giuliano (1960, 1968, 1977), Phocion Francescakis (1964), Fritz Schwind (1966, 1984), Ignaz Seidl-Hohenveldern (1968, 1986), Edoardo Vitta (1969, 1979), Alessandro Migliazza (1972), René Rodière (1972), Georges Droz (1974, 1991, 1999), Pierre Gothot (1981), Erik Jayme (1982, 1995, 2000), Bernard Audit (1984, 2003), Michel Pélichet (1987), Pierre Bourel (1989), Pierre Mayer (1989, 2007), Tito Ballarino (1990), Hélène Gaudemet-Tallon (1991, 2005), Alegría Borrás (1994, 2005), Francesco Capotorti (1995), Bertrand Ancel (1995), Giorgio Sacerdoti (1997), José Carlos Fernández Rozas (2001), Horatia Muir Watt (2004), Andrea Bonomi (2007), Dário Moura Vicente (2008), Mathias Audit (2012), Christian Kohler (2012), Fabrizio Marrella (2013), Étienne Pataut (2013).
