= Ilvo Diamanti =

Italian political scientist (born 1952)

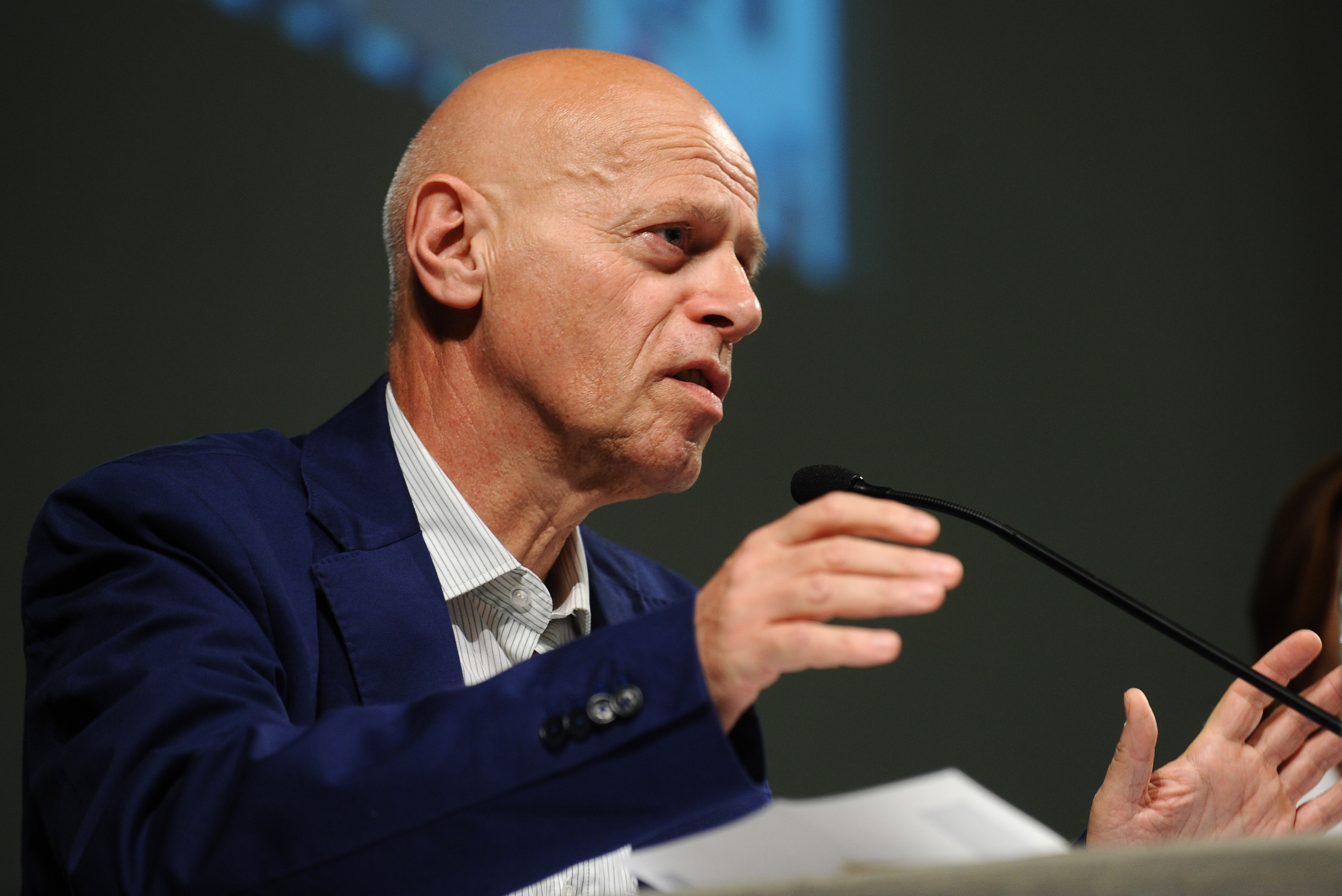
Diamanti in 2012

Ilvo Diamanti (born September 4, 1952) is an Italian political scientist.

== Early life and education ==
Diamanti was born in Cueno and graduated from the University of Padua with a degree in Political Science, and completed his Doctorate in Sociology and Social Research at the University of Trento. He was an assistant professor in methodology of social research in the Faculty of Statistics at the University of Padua and associate professor of Political Sociology at the University of Urbino "Carlo Bo".

== Career ==
In 1995, Diamanti began teaching the course Comparative Political Systems (Régimes Politiques Comparées) within the Master in Political Studies (Études Politiques) at Panthéon-Assas University. From 1999 to 2003, Diamanti was the scientific director of the Fondazione Nord Est in Venice. Diamanti is the scientific director of Demos & Pi (www.demos.it), an institute that conducts ongoing research on Italian society. Projects include the annual report "Gli Italiani e lo stato" (Italians and the State) and the quarterly reports of the "L'Osservatorio sul capitale sociale degli italiani" (Observatory on Italians' Social Capital). Diamanti founded and directs the Laboratory of Political and Social Studies in the Faculty of Sociology at the University of Urbino "Carlo Bo" (LaPolis - www.uniurb.it/lapolis), which conducts education and research with a national and international scope. From 2001 to 2003, Diamanti was the coordinator of the Doctorate in Sociology of Cultural Phenomena and Normative Processes.

Diamanti is a full professor of Political Science in the Faculty of Sociology at the University of Urbino "Carlo Bo", where he is also Vice Chancellor for International Relations and Local Development. Diamanti is the president of the Master program for Specialists in Local Development and Urban Policy. He directs an advanced course in Surveys, Media and Democracy focusing on the analysis of public opinion concerning politics and political institutions. Diamanti teaches Political Science and Political Sociology for the first level bachelor's degree of Sociology, and teaches Sociology of Political Identities for the second level bachelor's degree in Multicultural Sociology. Diamanti is a member of the scientific and editorial committees of the reviews: Rassegna Italiana di Sociologia, Rivista Italiana di Scienza Politica, Political and Economic Trends, liMes, Sviluppo locale, Economia e Società Regionale, and Critique Internationale.

Diamanti has collaborated with important national newspapers. He currently edits the "L'Osservatorio sul Nordest" (Observatory on the Northeast) at the Venetian newspaper Il Gazzetino; from 1995 to 2001 he was an editorialist for the daily Il Sole 24 Ore. Since 2001, he has produced "Mappe" (Maps) of Italian politics and society for the daily paper La Repubblica. He is part of the scientific committee of the Società Italiana di Studi Elettorali (Italian Society of Electoral Studies), and participates in research conducted by Itanes (Italian National Elections Studies).

== Research focus ==
The social changes of Italy through the generations: youth cultures; the change in values between the generation born after World War II who came of age in the 1960s and 1970s, and their children; the very young, the "invisible" generation which has grown up not knowing walls and ideologies, who are flexible but lack certainty, and who are masters of the new communication technologies. The transformations in the relationship between society and politics, the crisis of the political parties of the First Republic, and the emergence of new political formations: the autonomist leagues, Forza Italia and "personal parties". The evolution of the connection between the local territory and politics: the eclipse and the revival of national identity, the success of different forms of regionalism and localism, and the illusion of politics without territory. Currently, Diamanti's research on the European level is focusing on comparative analyses of how the topics of citizenship, identity and participation are changing in these times of integration and expansion.

== Selected publications ==
- [1986], with P.Allum, '50/'80, vent'anni. Due generazioni di giovani a confronto ('50/'80, Twenty Years. Comparing Two Generations of Youths), Rome, Edizioni lavoro.
- [1991], with A.Parisi, Elezioni a Trieste. Identità territoriale e comportamento di voto (Elections in Trieste. Local Identity and Voting Behavior), Bologna, Il Mulino.
- [1992], with G.Riccamboni, La parabola del voto bianco (The Rise and Fall of the "White Vote"), Vicenza, Neri Pozza.
- [1993], La Lega. Geografia, storia e sociologia di un nuovo soggetto politico (The League. Geography, History and Sociology of a New Political Subject), 1995 updated edition, Rome, Donzelli.
- [1996], Il male del Nord. Lega, localismo, secessione (The Illness of the North. The League, Localism, Secession), Rome, Donzelli.
- [1997], with M.Lazar (editor), Politique all'italienne (Politics Italian Style), Paris, PUF.
- [1999], (editor), La generazione invisibile (The Invisible Generation), Milan, Edizioni Il Sole 24 Ore.
- [2003], Bianco, rosso, verde… e azzurro. Mappe e colori dell'Italia politica (White, Red, Green... and Blue. Maps and Colors of Italian Politics), Bologna, Il Mulino.
- [2007], (editor), Società e partiti in Europa dopo la caduta del muro (Society and Politics in Europe after the Fall of the Wall), monographic issue of “Rassegna Italiana di Sociologia”, n. 3.

== Selected recent essays ==
- (with E.Lello) The Casa delle Libertà: A House of Cards?, in "Modern Italy", 1/2005, pp. 9–35.
- (with L.Ceccarini) Catholics and Politics after the Christian Democrats: the Influential Minority, Journal of Italian Modern Studies, 1/2007, pp. 8–36.
- "The Italian Centre-Right and Centre-Left: Between Parties and ‘the Party’", in West European Politics, 4/2007, pp. 733 – 762.
