= Lorella Cedroni =

Italian political philosopher

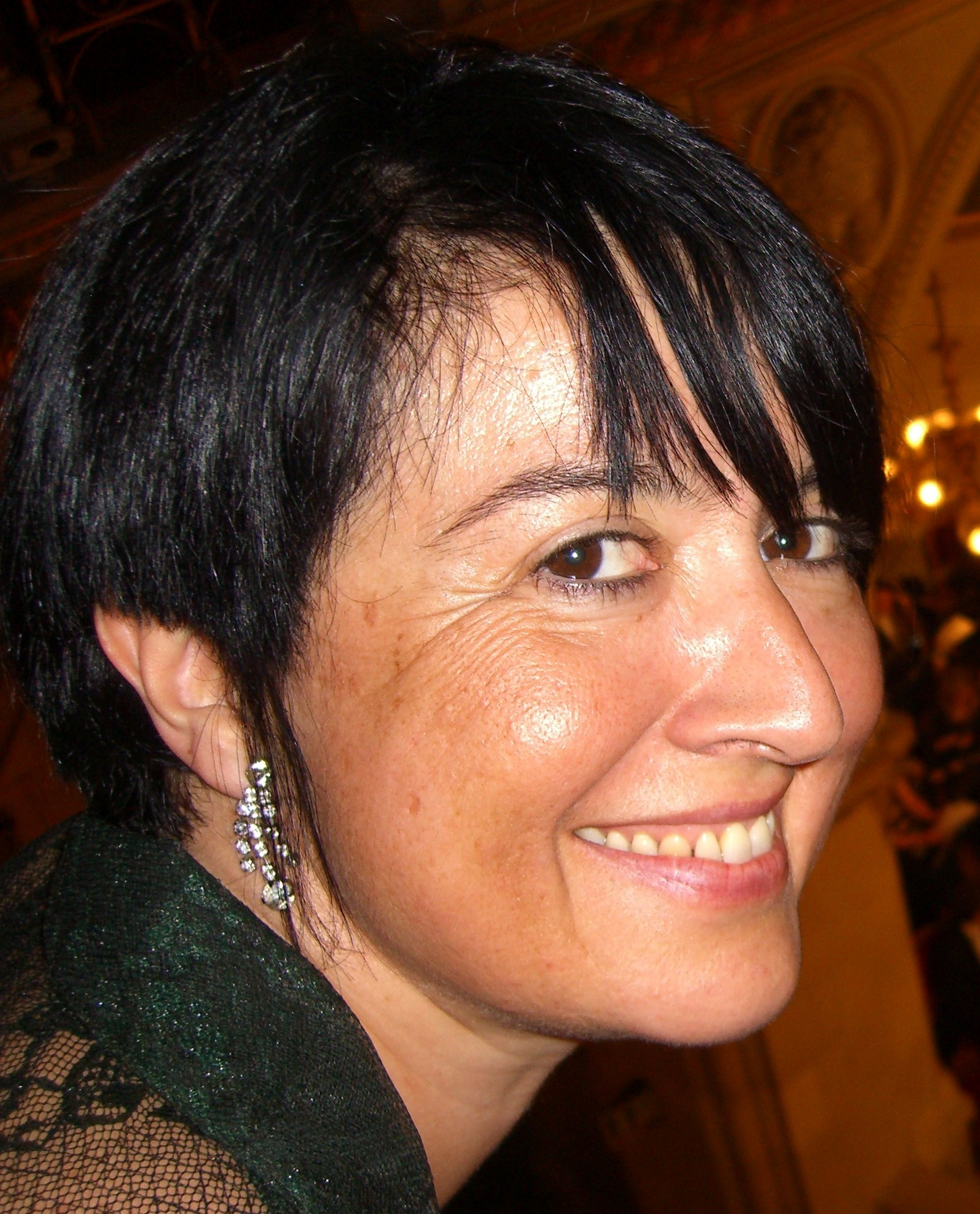
- Lorella Cedroni (2008)
- Born: 24 May 1961; Rome, Italy
- Died: 28 August 2013 (aged 52); Rome, Italy

Education
- Education: Sapienza University of Rome

Philosophical work
- Era: 20th-century philosophy; 21st-century philosophy
- Region: Western Political Philosophy
- Main interests: political theory; political language; democracy; political representation; gender studies; populism; human rights

Lorella Cedroni (24 May 1961 – 28 August 2013) was an Italian political philosopher.

== Career ==
Cedroni studied political science (Sapienza University of Rome, 1984) and philosophy (University of Urbino, 1991), receiving a Ph.D. in Political and Social Sciences (European University Institute, Florence, 1999). She has taught and lectured in many European and American universities, and mainly at Sapienza University of Rome.

She was research fellow at Columbia University (New York, 1992), at Council of Europe (Strasbourg, 1992), at St. John's College, Annapolis (MD, 1996–97), and visiting professor at the University of Adelaide (1996), at the University of Sydney (1996), at the University of Copenhagen (1997–98), at Complutense University of Madrid (2001), at University of Jordan (2005), at the University of Southern Denmark (2006), at Centre Marc Bloch of Berlin (2007), at the University of Athens (2008), at the Goethe University Frankfurt (2008), at Yildiz Technical University of Istanbul (2010), and at the University of Belgrade (2011). She was Fulbright distinguished professor of Political Theory at the University of Pittsburgh, PA, Usa, in 2008, and Directeur d'études associé (visiting professor) at Fondation Maison des Sciences de l'Homme, Paris, in 2010.

She has published books, articles and papers in several areas, including on theory of democracy, political representation, gender studies, political party systems in European countries, political use of language, electoral communication, and human rights.

== Books ==
- Lorella Cedroni (2017), Pasquinate. Sonetti romaneschi, Roma: ATPLC.
- Lorella Cedroni (2014), Politolinguistica. L'analisi del discorso politico, prefazione di T. De Mauro, Roma: Carocci.
- Lorella Cedroni (ed.) (2013), Aspetti del realismo politico italiano. Gaetano Mosca e Guglielmo Ferrero (Aspects of Italian political realism. Gaetano Mosca and Gugliemo Ferrero), Rome: Aracne.
- Lorella Cedroni and Marina Calloni (ed.) (2012), Filosofia politica contemporanea (Contemporary Political Philosophy), Firenze: Le Monnier.
- Lorella Cedroni (2011), Democrazia in nuce: il governo misto da Platone a Bobbio (Democracy in nuce: the mixed government form Plato to Bobbio), Milano: Angeli.
- Lorella Cedroni (ed.) (2010), Italian Critics of Capitalism, Laham MD: Lexington.
- Lorella Cedroni and Diego Garzia (ed.) (2010), Voting Advice Applications in Europe, Napoli: Scriptaweb.
- Lorella Cedroni (2010), Menzogna e potere nella filosofia politica occidentale (Lie and Power in Western Political Philosophy), Firenze: Le Lettere.
- Lorella Cedroni (2010), Il linguaggio politico della transizione tra populismo e anticultura (The Political Language of Transition between Populism and Anticulture), Roma: Armando.
- Lorella Cedroni (2009), Visioni della democrazia (Visions of Democracy), Roma: La Sapienza editrice.
- Lorella Cedroni (2006), Gugliemo Ferrero. Una biografia intellettuale, Roma: Aracne.
- Lorella Cedroni (2004), La rappresentanza politica. Teoria e modelli (Political Representation: Theory & Models), Milano: FrancoAngeli.
- Lorella Cedroni (ed.) (2004), Processi sociali e nuove forme di partecipazione politica, Milano: FrancoAngeli.
- Lorella Cedroni and Patricia Chiantera-Stutte (ed.) (2003), Questioni di biopolitica, Roma: Bulzoni.
- Lorella Cedroni and Tommaso Dell’Era (2002), Il linguaggio politico (The Political Language), Roma: Carocci.
- Lorella Cedroni and Carlo Mongardini (2001), I temi della politica, Genova: Ecig.
- Lorella Cedroni (2001), Rappresentare la differenza. Le donne nelle istituzioni elettive, Roma: Lithos.
- Lorella Cedroni and Pietro Polito (ed.) (2000), Saggi su Umberto Campagnolo, Roma: Aracne.
- Lorella Cedroni (2000), Partiti politici e gruppi di pressione, Roma: Aracne.
- Lorella Cedroni (2000), Diritti umani, diritti dei popoli, Roma: Aracne.
- Lorella Cedroni (ed.) (1998), Nuovi studi su Guglielmo Ferrero, Roma: Aracne.
- Lorella Cedroni (1998), Rappresentanza e partiti politici nella società della comunicazione, Roma: Seam.
- Lorella Cedroni and Marina Calloni (ed.) (1997), Politica e affetti familiari. Lettere di Amelia, Carlo e Nello Rosselli a Guglielmo, Leo e Nina Ferrero e Gina Lombroso Ferrero, 1917-1943, Milano: Feltrinelli.
- Lorella Cedroni (ed.) (1996), "Gender, Space and Power. A Conceptual Framework", International Review of Sociology, no. 3, London: Carfax.
- Lorella Cedroni (1996), Il lessico della rappresentanza politica, Soveria Mannelli: Rubbettino.
- Lorella Cedroni (1996), La comunità perfetta. Il pensiero politico di Francisco Suárez, Roma: Studium.
- Lorella Cedroni and Barbara Caruso (ed.) (1995), Federalismo. Antologia critica, Roma: Istituto poligrafico e Zecca dello Stato.
- Lorella Cedroni (ed.) (1994), Guglielmo Ferrero. Itinerari del pensiero, Napoli: Esi.
- Lorella Cedroni and Giuseppe Ceci (ed.) (1993), Filosofia e democrazia in Augusto del Noce, Roma: Cinque lune.
- Lorella Cedroni (1993), I tempi e le opere di Guglielmo Ferrero. Saggio di bibliografia internazionale, Napoli: Esi.
- Lorella Cedroni (1992), Per una filosofia dei valori. Saggio su Eugène Dupréel, Roma: EUroma.
- Lorella Cedroni (1987), La paura nel potere. Saggio su Guglielmo Ferrero, Poggibonsi: Lalli.
- Lorella Cedroni (1987), Democrazia degli antichi e democrazia dei moderni, Poggibonsi: Lalli.
