= Giuseppe Novelli =

President of University of Rome Tor Vergata
- In office 1 October 2013 – 30 September 2019
- Preceded by: Renato Lauro

Personal details
- Born: 27 February 1959 (age 67) Rossano, Italy
- Education: University of Urbino; Sapienza University of Rome
- Profession: Professor of genetics

Giuseppe Novelli (born 27 February 1959) is an Italian geneticist and the president of the University of Rome Tor Vergata.

== Early life and career ==
Born in Rossano in the south of Italy, he graduated magna cum laude in genetics at the University of Urbino in 1981. In 1985 earned a Ph.D at Sapienza University of Rome. In 1995 he was appointed professor of genetics at the University of Rome Tor Vergata.

From 2003 he has also been an adjunct professor at Arkansas University.

From 2008 to 2011 he was president of the Faculty of Medicine and Surgery at Tor Vergata. In 2013 he was elected rector of his university.
