= Ivo Mattozzi =

Italian historian

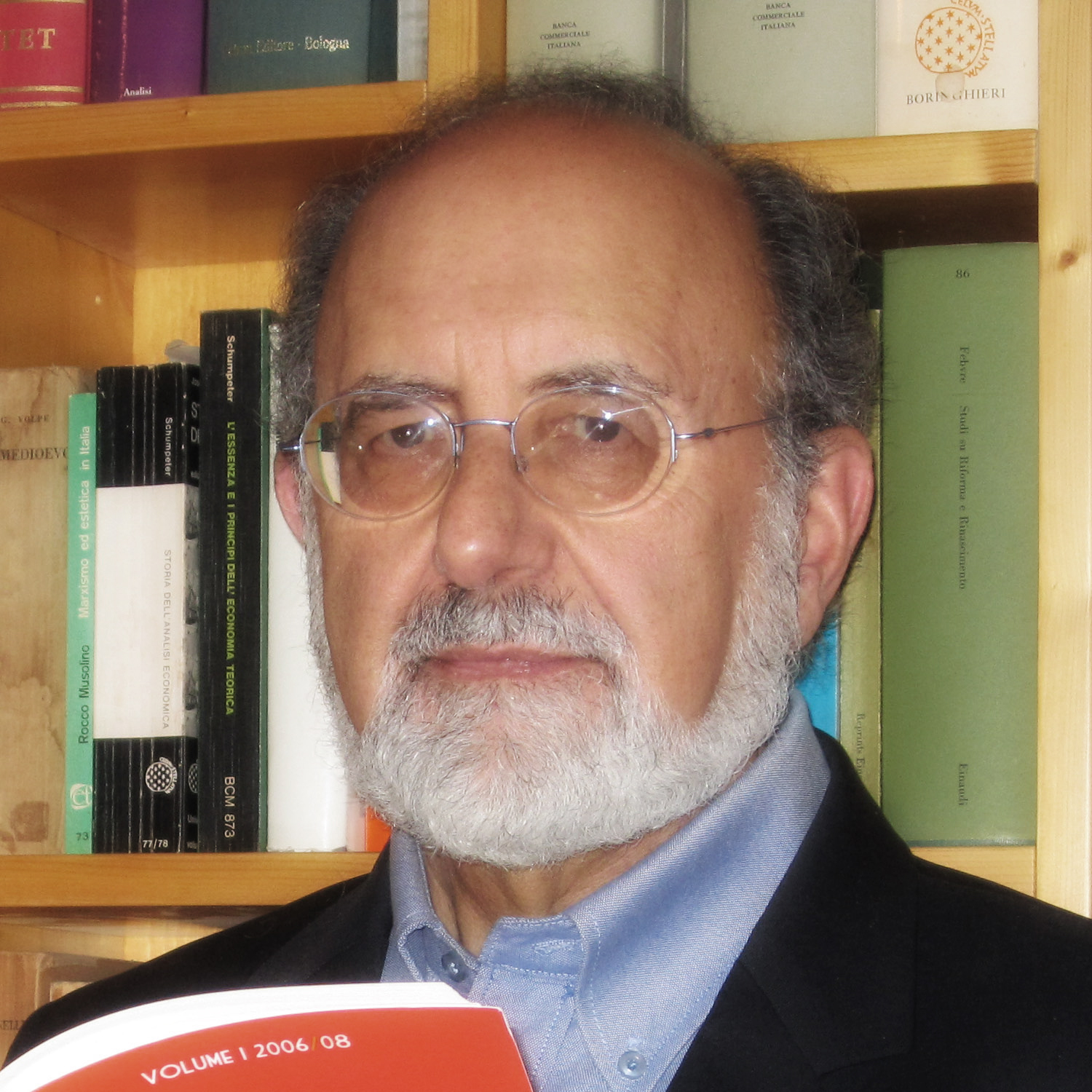
- Born: Ivo Mattozzi; 6 June 1940 (age 86); Pescara, Italy
- Education: University of Urbino
- Spouse: Rosa Vivante Scioletti (1972–present)
- Children: Alvise, Lorenzo
- Scientific career
- Workplaces: University of Bologna, Bologna; Free University of Bozen-Bolzano, Bressanone

Ivo Mattozzi (born June 6, 1940 in Pescara), is a professor at the University of Bologna. He teaches methodology and teaching of history. He has given lectures in Italy, Spain, Brazil and Argentina and was the president of the history association, "Clio '92". His articles and publications have been translated into Spanish, Portuguese and Greek.

== Bibliography ==
- La cultura storica: un modello di formazione, Faenza editore, Faenza, 1990
- Un curricolo per la storia: un proposta teorica e resoconti di esperienze, Cappelli, 1990.
- La storia: formazione temporale. Progetto di aggiornamento a distanza, Irrsae Lombardia, Milano,1991.
- Insegnare storia. Courseware per la formazione dei docenti di storia, MPI-Dipartimento di Discipline storiche, Roma- Bologna, 1999.
- Intraprese produttive in Terraferma in Storia di Venezia dalle origini alla caduta della Serenissima, vol. VII, La Venezia barocca, Istituto della Enciclopedia Italiana, Roma 1997, pp. 435–478.
- "Le cartiere nello Stato veneziano: una storia tra strutture e congiunture (1450-1797)", in M. Grazioli, I. Mattozzi, E. Sandal (a c. di) Mulini da carta. Le cartiere dell'Alto Garda. Tini e torchi tra Trento e Venezia, Verona, 2001, pp. 97–161.

== Recent publications ==
- "La didáctica de los bienes culturales: a la búsqueda de una definición", in J. Estepa Giménez, C. Dominguez Dominguez, J.M. Cuenca López, Museo y patrimonio en la didáctica de las ciencias sociales, Universidad de Huelva Publicaciones, Huelva, 2001.
- "L'arxiu simulat", in G. Tribò (coord), Didáctica amb fonts d'arxius (Libre d'Actas.Primeres jornades Ensenyament-Arxius, 5-6-7 setembre de 2002), ICE-UB, Barcelona, 2002, pp. 45–58.
- "Adottare un metodo. Prologo alla trasposizione consapevole nella didattica dei beni culturali" in S. Fontana (a c.di), Un monumento da adottare. (Atti della giornata di studio, 30 novembre 2001, Palazzo delle Stelline, Milano), Milano, 2002, pp. 48–60.
- "Pensare la nuova storia da insegnare" in Società e storia, n. 98 (a. 2002), pp. 785-812.
- "L'histoire scolaire de ce treize dernières annèes en Italie dans le contexte européen", in Le cartable de Clio, 2003, pp. 127–139.
- "cura del fascicolo monografico di "Rassegna"", La formazione iniziale degli insegnanti, Istituto Pedagogico, Bolzano, 2003.
- "Formazione iniziale degli insegnanti: avvertenze per pensarla", ibidem, pp. 5–20.
- "Storia e studi sociali: se trenta ore e duecento pagine vi sembran tante", ibidem, pp. 92–98.
- "Imparare storia in biblioteca", Clio '92 - Polaris, Faenza, 2003
- "La didattica laboratoriale nella modularità e nel curricolo di storia", in "I Quaderni di Clio '92, n. 4, dicembre 2003, pp. 41–54. - Didattica della storia: insegnare il primo sapere storico, corso di formazione a distanza, Firenze, Giunti, 2004.
- "Προσεγγίζοντας την ιστορική εκπαίδευση στις αρχές του 21ου αιώνα (Γιώργος Κόκκινος, Ειρήνη Νάκου)", Ivo Mattozzi, Γιώργος Κόκκινος, 2006
