= University of Urbino =

Italian university

Coordinates: 43°43′19″N 12°38′13″E

University of Urbino Carlo Bo
- Università degli Studi di Urbino Carlo Bo
- Latin: Studiorum Universitas Publica Urbinatensis
- Former names: Collegio dei Dottori di Urbino (1506); Pubblico Studio di Urbino (1576); Studio generale di Urbino (1671); Università di Urbino (1671); Libera Università Provinciale di Urbino (1862); Università Libera di Urbino (1923)
- Motto: Urbino città campus
- Motto in English: Urbino: a city campus
- Type: Public
- Established: 1506; 520 years ago
- Affiliations: UNIMED
- Rector: Giorgio Calcagnini
- Students: 13,876
- Undergraduates: 11,646
- Postgraduates: 2,230
- Doctoral students: n/a
- Location: Urbino, PU, Italy
- Campus: Whole town, UNESCO World Heritage Site
- Website: www.uniurb.it

The University of Urbino Carlo Bo (Italian: Università degli Studi di Urbino Carlo Bo, UniUrb) is an Italian university located in Urbino, in the region of Marche, in north-eastern central Italy. The main campus occupies numerous buildings throughout the historic Urbino town center and the nearby countryside, with a branch campus in Fano. The university's enrollment in 2019 was 11,646 undergraduate students and 2,230 graduate students, with 858 full-time or part-time instructional and research faculty across various departments.

Until 2006 it was a free university.

== History ==
The University of Urbino was founded 519 years ago in 1506 by Guidobaldo da Montefeltro, the Duke of Urbino. One year later, the magistracy of Urbino was granted power to award doctorates in canon and civil law by papal bull from Pope Julius II.

Starting in the 1960s, under the guidance of Carlo Bo as Rector, the university succeeded in buying up numerous derelict buildings in the historic center of Urbino. The numerous buildings which have since been restored are used by the university as department centers, classrooms, and libraries. It was under the long-lasting rectorship of professor Carlo Bo, distinguished humanist and Senator for Life, that the university enjoyed unprecedented growth in size and prestige, prompting the former president of the European Commission, Roy Jenkins, to state that "the University of Urbino is an incisive presence in contemporary thought, contributing in original ways to the cultural and intellectual life of Europe". This was also the period in which architect Giancarlo De Carlo designed and built the University Halls of Residence and redesigned and modernized several of the university's other buildings. In 2003, the university was named after Carlo Bo, after serving as rector for fifty-four years from 1947 until his death in 2001.

== Organization ==
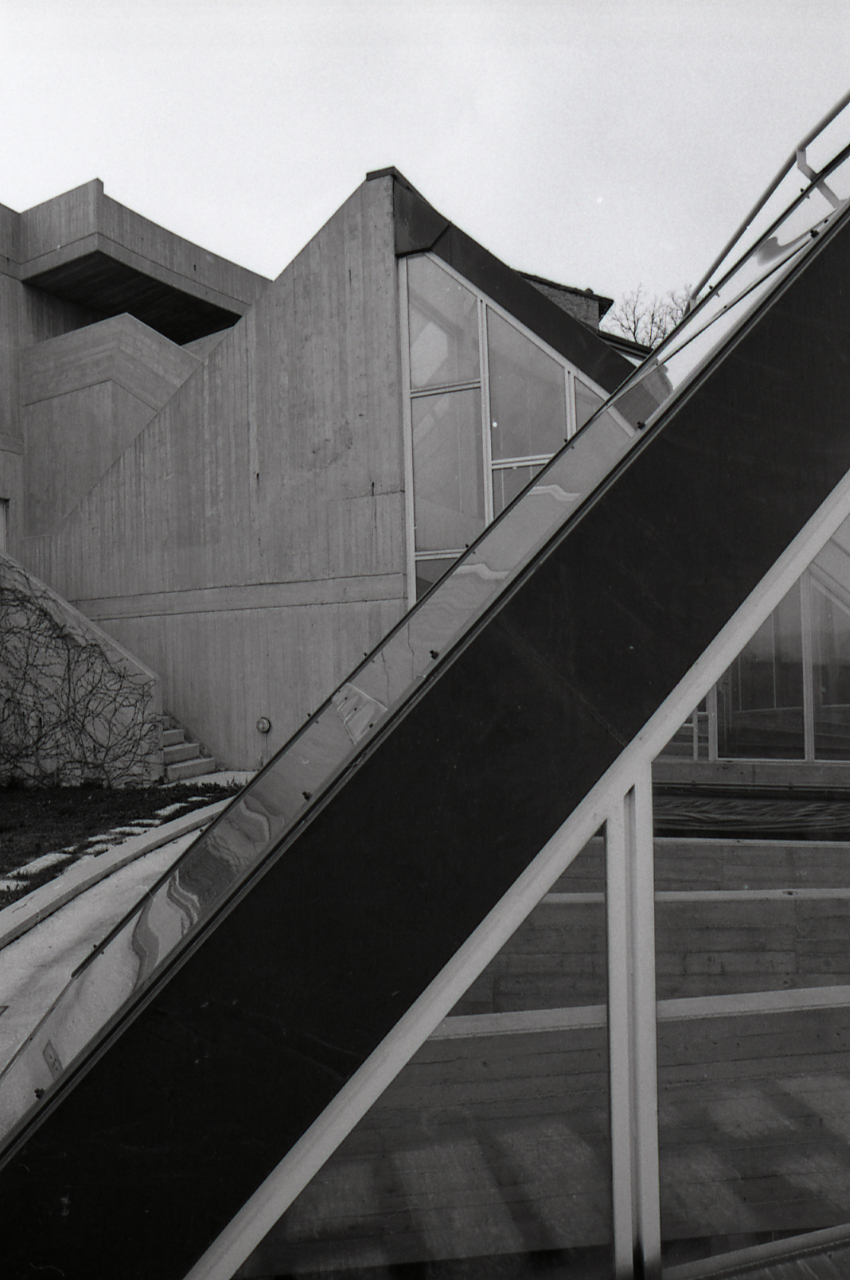
Faculty of Education, designed by Giancarlo De Carlo. Photo by Paolo Monti, 1982.

=== Departments ===
Until 2013 the university was divided into 11 faculties:

- Faculty of Economics
- Faculty of Education
- Faculty of Environmental Sciences
- Faculty of Law
- Faculty of Literature and philosophy
- Faculty of Mathematics, Physics and Natural Sciences
- Faculty of Modern Languages and Literature
- Faculty of Pharmacy
- Faculty of Political Science
- Faculty of Sociology
- Faculty of Sport Sciences

Following the approval of the so-called Gelmini reform in 2009, and starting from the 2013/2014 academic year, the faculty-based organisation was replaced by a department-based structure. It is currently composed of the following departments and institutes:

- Department of Pure and Applied Sciences (DISPeA)
- Department of Communication Sciences, Humanities and International Studies. Cultures, Languages, Literatures, Arts, Media (DISCUI)
- Department of Economics, Society, Politics (DESP)
- Department of Humanities (DISTUM)
- Department of Law (DIGIUR)
- Department of Biomolecular Sciences (DISB)
- Superior Institute of Religious Sciences 'Italo Mancini' (ISSR)
- Institute of Journalism (Ifg)

=== Ranking ===
University rankings

Global – Overall
- CWUR World: 1191 (2025)
- QS World: 1201–1400 (2026)
- THE World: 1201–1500 (2025)
- USNWR Global: 1476 (2025)

=== Libraries ===
The University offers to students and staff a number of libraries making up the University Library System, such as the Library for Modern and Contemporary European Literature from the charitable 'Carlo and Marise Bo' foundation.

=== Colleges ===
The University does not have its own residence halls. However, a number of colleges and dormitories for University of Urbino students are owned and managed by the regional office for the right to academic education. They include four colleges (Vela, Tridente, Aquilone and Serpentine) and one female dormitory (Casa Studentessa) in Urbino, one college located in the scientific campus between Urbino and Fermignano, and a number of rented private accommodation blocks in Pesaro and Fano, paid for by the regional government.

== Prizes ==
The Commandino Medal is awarded by the University every year in recognition of extraordinary contributions in the history of science.

The commission charged with awarding the Commandino medal is appointed by the Director of the International Study Center Urbino and Perspective. Scientific humanism from Piero and Leonardo to the Galilean revolution and the candidates are chosen according to their contributions to the history of science. It has been awarded annually since 2014, with no award being made in 2019. The 2021 and 2022 medals were awarded in 2022 and 2023. Awardees: Reviel Netz (Israel, 2014), William René Shea (Canada, 2015), Enrico Gamba (Italy, 2016), Roger Penrose (UK, 2017), Jürgen Renn (Germany, 2018), Monica Ugaglia (Italy, 2020), Victor Pambuccian (Romania, 2021), Karine Chemla (France, 2022), Niccolò Guicciardini (Italy, 2025).

The Dal Monte Medal is awarded by the University every year in recognition of contributions in the history of science by young researchers. It was inaugurated in 2022. Awardees: Vincenzo de Risi (Italy, 2022), Flavia Marcacci (Italy, 2023), Nathan Camillo Sidoli (U.S.A., 2025) .

== Notable people ==
=== Alumni ===
- Majlinda Bregu, politician, minister of European Integration of Albania (2009–2013)
- Duccia Camiciotti, poet and writer
- Lorella Cedroni, political philosopher
- Valeria Ciavatta, politician, captain regent of San Marino in 2003–2004 and in 2014
- Ivo Mattozzi, historian
- Alessia Morani, politician, MP since 2013
- Alessandra Moretti, politician, MP (2013–2014) and MEP (2014–2015)
- Giuseppe Novelli, biologist
- Mario Pappagallo, journalist
- Giovanna Trillini, foil fencer, multiple medalist at Olympics and World Championships

=== Faculty and staff ===
==== 19th century ====
- Giovanni de' Brignoli di Brünnhoff, botanist, founder of the Orto Botanico "Pierina Scaramella"
- Alessandro Serpieri, astronomer and seismologist

==== 20th century ====
- Anna Maria Bisi, archaeologist
- Carlo Bo, literary critic, senator for life (1984–2001), rector of the university (1947–2001)
- Sabino Cassese, constitutional lawyer, minister of Public Administration (1993–1994), member of the Constitutional Court of Italy (2005–2014)
- Umberto Piersanti, poet and sociologist of literature
- Cesare Questa, classicist
- Paolo Virno, philosopher and semiologist
- Bruno Visentini, politician and business lawyer, minister of Finance (1974–1976 and 1983–1987), minister for Budget (1979) and several times MP

==== 21st century ====
- Khaled Fouad Allam, sociologist and MP (2006–2008)
- Stefano Arduini, linguist
- Ilvo Diamanti, political scientist and sociologist
- Alessandro Jacchia, television producer
- Domenico Losurdo, political theorist and philosopher
- Massimo Negrotti, AI sociologist
- Mario Vella, philosopher and social theorist

== Points of interest ==
- Orto Botanico "Pierina Scaramella", the university's botanical garden.

== See also ==
- List of early modern universities in Europe
- List of Italian universities
- Urbino
- Urbino European Law Seminar
