= Cesare Questa =

Cesare Questa (1934-2016) was an Italian classicist particularly known for his studies of the metres of the Roman playwrights Plautus and Terence. His researches over many years were summed up in his major work La Metrica di Plauto e Terenzio published in Urbino in 2007.

Questa was born in Milan, the son of Angelo Questa, an orchestra conductor, and Ada Filippini, a mezzosoprano singer.

He initially studied in Rome, at the Facoltà di Lettere della Sapienza, under the teacher Ettore Paratore. His earliest work was a thesis on the historian Tacitus. He moved to Urbino in 1963, where he mostly devoted his time to the study of Plautus. In 1970 he founded l’Istituto di Civiltà Antiche, which housed among other things a large collection of reproductions of manuscripts of Plautus and Terence. In 1996 he created the Centro Internazionale di Studi Plautini, which holds international conferences on Plautine studies.

In 1990 Cesare Questa was made a member of the Accademia dei Lincei, or Lincean Academy, which is the national academy of science and literature of Italy.

He died in Urbino, where at the time of his death he was Emeritus Professor of Latin at the University of Urbino.

== Works by Cesare Questa ==
For a full list of the works of Cesare Questa, see: IdRef: Questa, Cesare (1934-....).

- Studi sulle fonti degli Annales di Tacito. Roma: Edizioni Dell'ateneo. (1960).
- Introduzione alla metrica di Plauto. Bologna: Patròn. (1967).
- Per la storia del testo di Plauto nell'Umanesimo. Roma : Edizioni Dell'ateneo (1968).
- Numeri Innumeri (1984).
- Parerga Plautina (1985).
- Semiramide redenta: archetipi, fonti classiche, censure antropologiche nel melodramma (1989).
- Titi Macci Plauti Cantica (1995).
- L’Aquila a Due Teste (1998).
- La Metrica di Plauto e Terenzio (2007). Urbino: Quattro Venti.
- Il nuovo volto di Plauto. (Lecture in Italian). (2010).
- "Paratore, Ettore" in Dizionario Biografico degli Italiani, Volume 81, Roma, Istituto dell'Enciclopedia Italiana (2014).
