= Anceps =

In languages with quantitative poetic metres, such as Ancient Greek, Latin, Arabic, Sanskrit, and classical Persian, an anceps (plural ancipitia or (syllabae) ancipites) is a position in a metrical pattern which can be filled by either a long or a short syllable.

In general, anceps syllables in words, such as the first syllable of the Greek words Ἄρης Árēs (the Greek god of war) or πικρός pikrós "bitter", which can be treated by poets as either long or short, can be distinguished from anceps elements or positions in a metrical pattern, which are positions where either a long syllable or a short syllable can be used.

Another distinction can be made between the ordinary anceps positions at the beginning or middle of a line of verse and the phenomenon of brevis in longo, which is when a short syllable at the end of a line counts as long because of the pause which follows.

The word anceps comes from the Latin anceps, ancipitis, meaning "two-headed, uncertain, unfixed". The usage of the word in a metrical context is, however, relatively modern, and is not found in ancient writers.

== In Ancient Greek ==
Anceps elements can be found in a variety of metres in Ancient Greek. Anceps elements in the middle or beginning of a line are characteristic of the iambic trimeter of Greek drama. A typical iambic trimeter has the following form ("–" = long, "u" = short, and "×" = anceps):

| × – u – | × – u – | × – u – |

Except for the last element, an anceps or a longum is sometimes replaced by two short syllables (see Resolution (meter) and Prosody (Greek)#Iambic).

In the trochaic metres, on the other hand, the anceps comes at the end of each metron, for example the trochaic tetrameter catalectic:

| – u – × | – u – × || – u – × | – u – |

Anceps elements are also found in the Aeolic metres, such as the Sapphic metre, in which the first three lines are as follows, opening with a trochaic metron:

| – u – × | – u u – | u – – |

In other Aeolic metres, it is possible for a line to begin with two anceps syllables in succession, for example in the glyconic metre:

| × × | – u u – | u – |

In such metres it is not allowed for both ancipitia to be short; both in the Aeolic metres and in the eupolidean, the usual form of the base is – – or – u, with u – occurring much less often. Martin West argues that this double anceps opening is a relic of an earlier period, also reflected in Sanskrit, when the beginning of a line of poetry had free scansion and only the end was fixed.

West points out that in Ancient Greek, an anceps is not found next to a short element. He argues that in most metres, every 2nd or 3rd element is compulsorily long, and can be considered a locus princeps (principal position). Either before or after a princeps there must be a short element. Between each princeps and the next there can be either an anceps, a short, or two shorts.

Some metres, such as the dactylic and anapaestic metres, have no anceps syllables, although they make liberal use of biceps.

== In Latin ==
In Latin, in the metres of Roman comedy such as those of Plautus, anceps syllables are even more common than in the Greek equivalents. In Plautus the iambic senarius (which is the equivalent of the Greek iambic trimeter) has this form:

| × – × – | × – × – | × – u – |

The anceps elements, however, are not all equal, since the 2nd and 4th anceps elements, which are always short in Greek verse, tend to be short more frequently than the other ancipites. These two are long in 60% of lines, the 1st and 3rd in 80% of lines, and the 5th in 90% of lines. In the first two metrons, any of the long or anceps positions can be resolved into two short syllables, but this happens less frequently in anceps positions than in long ones.

Other metres which may have anceps positions in Latin are the bacchiac and cretic metres used in cantica (songs) in the plays of Plautus. For example, the bacchiac quaternarius is as follows:

| × – – | × – – | × – – | × – – |

and the cretic as follows:

| – × – | – u – || – × – | – u – |

The hendecasyllable metre used by Catullus and Martial has the following form, beginning in the same way as a glyconic line (see above):

| × × | – u u – u – u – – |

The first two syllables are usually long, but occasionally in Catullus u – or – u is found.

However, in other metres of Latin poetry, anceps syllables do not occur (except for the usual possibility of brevis in longo at the end of the line). For example, in the dactylic hexameter, much use is made of biceps syllables, but there is no anceps and no resolution:

| – uu | – uu | – uu | – uu | – uu | – × |

There is also a pure form of iambic, used in Catullus 4, which also makes no use of anceps or resolution:

| u – u – | u – u – | u – u – |

== In Arabic ==
Anceps elements are also common in classical Arabic poetry. Unlike Greek metres, in Arabic, an anceps can often be found next to a short element, as in the most common Arabic metre, the Ṭawīl, of which the half-verse has the following form:

| u – × | u – × – | u – × | u – u – |

Another very common metre, the basīṭ, has this form:

| × – u – | × u – | – – u – | uu – |

The eighth element in the Basīṭ metre is also theoretically anceps but in practice (in more than 99% of lines) it is always long.

In the rajaz metre, which is similar to the Greek iambic trimeter, the first two elements of each metron are anceps, although it is rare for both elements to be short:

| × × u – | × × u – | × × u – |

In some metres, such as the popular Kāmil metre, biceps elements are used instead of anceps:

| uu – u – | uu – u – | uu – u – |

== In Persian ==
In classical Persian poetry, apart from brevis in longo (see below), anceps elements are for the most part found only at the beginning of a line. In most metres which begin with two short syllables, the first may be replaced by a long. Thus the meter khafīf (the most common metre used in Saadi's Golestān), has the following form:

| × u – – | u – u – | u u – |

In such verses, the anceps is long in about 80% of cases.

The only other place in Persian metre where there is a choice between long and short is in the ruba'i metre used in Omar Khayyam's quatrains, which goes as follows:

| – – | – u u – | × × u – | – u u – |

The two ancipitia may be either u – or – u, but not two shorts or two longs. (The first is slightly more common.)

== In Sanskrit ==
In Sanskrit, the classical language of ancient India, in the early period in some metres the first part of the line was very free. For example, epic poems such as the Mahābhārata were mostly composed in a type of stanza known as the śloka, which developed from the vedic anuṣṭubh metre. A śloka usually consists of two 16-syllable half-verses of the following pattern:

| × × × × | u – – × || × × × × | u – u × |

However, this does not quite give the full picture, since the second metron | u – – × | could sometimes be | u u u × | , | – u u × | , | –, – – × | or | – u – × |. These variations are known as vipulas. Another restriction is that in the 1st and 3rd metron, the pattern | × u u × | was not permitted (see Śloka). As with Greek, Latin, and Arabic, the last element of every Sanskrit metre is anceps, that is, either long or brevis in longo.

Another metre, the triṣṭubh, which is commonly used in the Rigveda, the earliest form of Sanskrit, has four 11-syllable lines of the following pattern (the symbol "," represents a caesura or break between words). Thus the 5th element is an anceps, which if short must be preceded by a word-break, if long it must be followed by one:

| × – × – , u u – – u – × | or
| × – × – – , u – – u – × |

In the high classical period of Sanskrit literature (5th to 12th century CE), a large number of metres were developed which for the most part had no anceps elements. For example, the mandākrāntā metre, made popular by Kālidāsa in his poem Meghadūta, has the following form without variation:

| – – – – | u u u u u – | – u – – u – – |

A third type of Indian metre, commonly used in Prakrit literature, but also sometimes in Sanskrit, is typified by the āryā metre. In metres of this type, lines of varying length are made up of feet which can be of any combination of long and short syllables, such as | – – |, | u u u u |, | – u u |, | u u – | or | u – u |, that adds up to the equivalent of four short syllables.

== Anceps vs. brevis in longo ==
The anceps is distinct from brevis in longo, which refers to the phenomenon whereby a normally short syllable counts as long when used at the end of a line. The possibility of brevis in longo is found universally across all metres, while the anceps is found only in particular verse forms. Also, a brevis in longo is always felt to be long, while the anceps may be short or long freely.

== See also ==
- Prosody (Greek)
- Prosody (Latin)
- Metres of Roman comedy
- Arabic prosody
- Persian metres
- Brevis in longo
