= List of meters in medieval Hebrew poetry =

In the Middle Ages, Hebrew poetry was written in a variety of different meters. This page will list all the various meters, with links to the specific pages about each meter, its history, and its use. The English terms used here are the terms officially endorsed by the Academy of the Hebrew Language.

- Tetracolon meter (מִשְׁקָל מְרֻבָּע) -- used by the earliest authors of piyyut, in the pre-classical period of piyyut (through the fifth century), and subsequently for some very traditional genres, such as the ‘Avoda genre.
- Accentual meter (מִשְׁקָל הַטְעָמָתִי)
- Lexemic meter (מִשְׁקָל הַתֵּבוֹת)

Starting with Dunash ben Labrat in the 10th century, poets in the Iberian Peninsula, and subsequently also elsewhere, began to use traditional Arabic systems of meter in their Hebrew poetry. These can be divided into:

- Simple-syllable meter (מִשְׁקַל הַתְּנוּעוֹת)
- Syllabic-quantitative meter (מִשְׁקָל הֲבָרָתִי-כַמּוּתִי)
- Syllabic-grammatical meter (מִשְׁקָל הֲבָרָתִי-דִקְדּוּקִי)
- Syllabic-phonetic meter (מִשְׁקָל הֲבָרָתִי-פֿוֹנֶטִי)

Medieval Hebrew poets used at least ten types of syllabic-quantitative meter. These have both Hebrew and Arabic names:

- Hazaj (Arabic: الهَزَج, al-hazaj; Hebrew הַמִּשְׁקָל הַמַּרְנִין, ha-mishqal ha-marnin)
- Wāfir (Arabic: الوافِر, al-wāfir; Hebrew הַמִּשְׁקָל הַמְּרֻבֶּה, ha-mishqal ha-merubbe)
- Kāmil (Arabic الكامِل, al-kāmil; Hebrew הַמִּשְׁקָל הַשָּׁלֵם, ha-mishqal ha-shalem)
- Sarīˁ (Hebrew: המשקל המהיר, ha-mishqal ha-mahir)
- Ṭawīl (Hebrew: המשקל הארוך, ha-mishqal ha-’arokh)
- Khafīf (Hebrew: המשקל הקל, ha-mishqal ha-qal)
- Basīṭ (Hebrew: המשקל המתפשט, ha-mishqal ha-mithpasheṭ)
- Mutaqārib (Hebrew: המשקל המתקרב, ha-mishqal ha-mitqarev)
- Mujṯaṯṯ (Hebrew: המשקל הקטוע, ha-mishqal ha-qaṭua‘)
- Ramal (Hebrew: המשקל הקלוע, ha-mishqal ha-qalua‘)

== See also ==
- Arabic prosody
