= Persian metres =

Metres of Persian poetry

Persian metres (Persian: وزن شعر فارسی) refer to the quantitative metrical patterns of long and short syllables used in traditional Persian poetry.

Historically, the formal analysis and terminology of Persian metres are derived from the Arabic ʿarūḍ system, established by Al-Khalil ibn Ahmad al-Farahidi in the 8th century. Persian prosodists adapted this descriptive framework to fit the distinct phonetic structures of the Persian language. It has recently been argued, however, that although Persian metres are traditionally given Arabic names, they are an independent development and not merely imitations of Arabic ones.

Until the advent of free verse in the 20th century, Persian poetry was strictly quantitative. Since short vowels are not written in the Persian script, a knowledge of metre is often essential for correct recitation and meaning resolution.

A specific feature of Persian metrical scansion is the categorization of syllables into three lengths: short, long, and overlong. In Persian prosody, an overlong syllable is metrically equivalent to a long syllable followed by a short one.

Persian metrical practice became highly influential. It was subsequently adopted and imitated in Turkish poetry during the Ottoman period, and in Urdu poetry under the Mughal emperors. This influence is evident in metre selection: Turkish and Urdu poets frequently favoured the specific metres popularized by Persian lyric poetry, while largely avoiding the most common traditional Arabic metres (such as the ṭawīl, kāmil, wāfir, and basīṭ).

== Quantitative verse ==
Classical Persian poetry is based not on stress but on quantity, that is, on the length of syllables. A syllable ending in a short vowel is short (u), but one ending in a long vowel or a consonant is long (–). Thus a word like ja-hān 'world' is considered to have a short syllable plus a long one (u –), whereas far-dā 'tomorrow' consists of two long syllables (– –). A word like na-fas 'breath' is usually considered to have a short syllable plus a long one (u –), but if a vowel follows, as in na-fa-sī 'a breath', the second syllable is short (u u –).

A characteristic feature of classical Persian verse is that in addition to long and short syllables, it also has "overlong" syllables. These are syllables consisting of any vowel + two consonants, such as panj 'five' or dūst 'friend', or a long vowel + one consonant (other than n), for example rūz 'day' or bād 'wind'. In the metre of a poem, an overlong syllable can take the place of any sequence of "long + short". They can also be used at the end of a line, in which case the difference between long and overlong is neutralised.

In modern colloquial pronunciation, the difference in length between long and short vowels is mostly not observed (see Persian phonology), but when reciting poetry the long vowels are pronounced longer than the short ones. When a recording of Persian verse is analysed, it can be seen that long syllables are on average pronounced longer than short ones, and overlong syllables are longer still (see below for details).

In this article, the following scansion symbols are used:

- u = a short syllable
- – = a long syllable
- –u = an overlong syllable
- x = anceps, that is: some metres allow either a long or short syllable at the beginning of a line.
- u u = biceps, that is, a pair of short syllables that can be freely replaced by one long syllable. Mainly this occurs when a line ends in u u –, rarely elsewhere.

== Metrical patterns ==
From a metrical point of view, classical Persian poetry can be divided into three main types.

=== Masnavi ===
The first type is poems in rhyming couplets, known as masnavi (plural masnavīyāt). These are almost always written in one of seven different metres consisting of 11 (or in one case of 10) syllables, and each couplet has its own separate rhyme. The 11-syllable tradition may go back to pre-Islamic times, since 11-syllable poetry seems to have been common at that time.

Some of the poems written in the masnavi form are very long, up to 50,000 couplets. The most commonly used metres are the following (Elwell-Sutton's code follows each metre):

u – – | u – – | u – – | u – (e.g. Ferdowsi's Shahnameh or Saadi's Bustan): 1.1.11 (motaqāreb)
u – – – | u – – – | u – – (e.g. Gorgani's Vis and Ramin or Nezami's Khosrow and Shirin): 2.1.11 (hazaj)
– u – – | – u – – | – u – (e.g. Rumi's Masnavi-ē Ma'navī or Attar's Conference of the Birds): 2.4.11 (ramal)
– – u | u – u – | u – – (e.g. Nezami's Leyli and Majnun or Khaqani's Tuhfat al-Iraqayn): 5.1.10 (also hazaj)
x u – – | u – u – | u u – (e.g. Sanai's Hadīqatu-l-Haqīqa or Nezami's Seven Portraits): 4.5.11 (xafīf)

Some shorter poems also, such as many of those in Saadi's Golestān, are also written in rhyming couplets in one or another of these metres, a famous example being Banī Ādam from the Golestān, which consists of three rhyming couplets in the first of the above metres.

The 12th-century poet Nezami famously wrote a set of 5 masnavīyāt, each in a different one of the above metres, totalling nearly 29,000 couplets in all. Such a quintet was known as a khamsa or khamse (from the Arabic خَمْسة xamsa '(group of) five'), and the practice was later imitated by other poets such as Amir Khosrow of Delhi and Khwaju Kermani of Shiraz.

=== Lyric poetry ===
The second type of Persian poetry is lyric poetry, such as the ghazals of Hafez, or the spiritual poems in Rumi's collection known as the Diwan-e Shams-e Tabrizi. These tend to be in longer metres, usually of 14 to 16 syllables long, in tetrameter form (i.e. with four feet in each hemistich or half-verse).

About 30 different metres are commonly used for lyric poems, but 70% of the poems are written in one of the following seven metres:

u – u – | u u – – | u – u – | u u – (15 syllables): 4.1.15
– – | u – u – | u u – – | u – u – (14 syllables): 4.7.14
– u – – | – u – – | – u – – | – u – (15 syllables): 2.4.15
x u – – | u u – – | u u – – | u u – (15 syllables): 3.1.15
x u – – | u – u – | u u – (11 syllables): 4.5.11
u – – – | u – – – | u – – – | u – – – (16 syllables): 2.1.16
– – | u u – – | u u – – | u u – – (14 syllables): 3.3.14

The shorter metre 4.5.11 is frequently used for masnavīyāt, but can also be used for lyric writing, such as in eight of Hafez's ghazals.

Occasionally a metre is made up of two short sections, the second a repetition of the first, such as the following:

– u u – | – u – || – u u – | – u – (7 + 7 syllables): 3.4.7(2) = 4.4.7(2)

The majority of lyric poetry is composed in the form of couplets, in which the first couplet is rhyming couplet, and then the same rhyme is used at the end of every couplet until the end of the poem. A minority of lyric poetry is composed in stanzas with more complicated rhyme schemes.

=== Ruba'i ===
The third type of poetry is the ruba'i or quatrain, such as the rubaiyat of Omar Khayyam. In these, either of two 13-syllable metres are used, which are variants of each other (often both are used in the same poem). These metres are only used for rubaiyat. A single long syllable may freely be substituted at the end of the verse where the pattern has "u u", and also sometimes in syllables 3 and 4:

– | – u u – | – u u – | – u u – : 3.3.13
– | – u u – | u – u – | – u u – : 5.1.13

The rhyme scheme for a ruba'i is AA BA; in this respect it resembles lyric poetry rather than a masnavi.

=== Metric variations ===
In all classical Persian poetic forms the same metre is used throughout a poem, the only variations being:

(i) the combination – u can be replaced by one overlong syllable;

(ii) at the end of a line, or before a dieresis, the rhythm u u – can be replaced by – –;

(iii) in the beginning of a line u u is often replaced by – u ;

(iv) the final syllable of a line always counts as long, whatever its shape.

In Persian poetry it is not possible to have more than two short syllables in a row. The pattern – u u – u u –, which is very common in Latin and Greek poetry, is also never found in Persian. Unlike in Arabic poetry, anceps syllables (x), i.e. the syllables of arbitrary length, are not found in any place in the line, except the first syllable if the second one is short and the third one is long (see the variation (ii)). This anceps first syllable can be seen in metres 3.1.11(M), 3.1.15, 3.1.16 and 4.5.11(M) in the table of common metres below.

In addition to the above metric variations, another source of variety is the word accent, which changes from line to line, thus avoiding monotony.

== The traditional description ==
Until recently Persian metres were always described using the same terms as in Arabic poetry, using the system known as ʿarūḍ (Arabic: عروض, Persian pronunciation: 'arūz) devised by the Arab grammarian Al-Khalil in the 8th century AD. Thus for example the rhythm of Ferdowsi's epic poem the Shahnameh (u – – | u – – | u – – | u –) was thought to be a modification of the Arabic metre mutaqārib, which is similar (u – x | u – x | u – x | u –). (In this notation, u is used for a short syllable, – for a long one, and x for an anceps, which may be either long or short.) Another possibility, however, since this metre was not used in Arabic until the Islamic period, is that it was borrowed from Persian into Arabic.

Since Persian metres are generally different from Arabic ones, often the match between Arabic and Persian is not exact. Thus in the traditional system, both of the metres below are considered to be adaptations of the Arabic metre hazaj (u – – x | u – – x || u – – x | u – – x):

u – – – u – – – u – – (2.1.11)
– – u u – u – u – – (5.1.10)

Another point is that the four most popular Arabic metres (the ṭawīl, kāmil, wāfir and basīṭ) are virtually never used in Persian, while three of the basic Persian metres are not found in Arabic.

In addition, one of the characteristics of Arabic poetry, namely the anceps positions (that is, certain places in the line where a syllable can be either long or short), do not apply to the Persian version of the Arabic metres. In Persian, except in certain metres where the first syllable only may be either long or short, the length of the syllables in any metre is either long or short but never variable.

== A new approach ==
The description of Persian metres was revolutionised with the publication in 1975 of an article in the journal Iran by L. P. Elwell-Sutton, later expanded into a book The Persian Metres (1976) and summarised in his entry ʾArūż (1986) in the Encyclopædia Iranica. Elwell-Sutton argued against the idea that Persian metres are simply an adaptation of Arabic ones, and on the whole his view has been accepted by subsequent scholars. As François de Blois writes in Persian Literature: A Bio-Bibliographical Survey: "Many Persian metres, particularly those used in lyric poetry, do not correspond to any Arabic metre, this despite the fact that the traditional Persian prosodic theory has given them elaborate Arabic names and attempted to 'derive' them from the standard Arabic metres with which they share a name."

What has been less readily accepted by other scholars is Elwell-Sutton's contention that the Persian metres as a whole carry on a tradition derived from pre-Islamic Persian poetry. According to De Blois there is no evidence that pre-Islamic poetry was quantitative rather than accentual. His view is that "the pioneers of Persian poetry, besides borrowing, or rather adapting, some of the Arabic metres, also developed a number of new, purely Persian metres of an Arabic (i.e. quantitative) type."

== Elwell-Sutton's classification ==
After examining the metres of over 20,000 Persian poems, Elwell-Sutton realised that the vast majority of them (well over 99%) could be analysed in terms of just five repeating patterns. (Here the symbol u refers to a short syllable, and – to a long one.)

1. u – – | u – –
2. u – – – | u – – –
3. u u – – | u u – –
4. u – u – | u u – –
5. – – u u | – u – u

Using these patterns it is possible to classify any metre using three numbers. Thus the metre – u – – – u – – – u – , used in Rumi's Masnavi, can be seen as a variety of the second pattern, and can be classified as 2.4.11 (= 2nd pattern, starting on the 4th syllable, 11 syllables long); and – – u u – u – u – – , used in Nezami's Leyla o Majnun, is classified as 5.1.10 (pattern 5, starting on syllable 1, 10 syllables long).

This system of labelling makes it possible to refer to the different metres in a simpler way than the traditional system, where the metre of Omar Khayyam's quatrains is divided into 24 different patterns with labels such as hazaj-e musamman-e axrab-e maqbūz-e makfūf-e majbūb.

Elwell-Sutton also calculated the frequency of occurrence of the various metres. He found that although over 100 different metres exist, 99% of classical Persian poems use one of a group of about 30 common metres, of which some are more frequent than others.

== Rules of prosody ==
=== Syllable length ===
To "scan" a line of poetry is to establish which syllables are long and which are short so that it can be read properly. According to the European method, the line is first divided into syllables, each of which must contain a short vowel (a, e, o), a long vowel (ā, ē, ī, ō, ū) or a diphthong (ey, ow, āy, ūy). A syllable must start with a consonant, if one is available, but not more than one. Thus goftan 'to say' is divided gof-tan and 'ādam 'Adam' is divided 'ā-dam.

Syllables in Persian poetry are of three lengths. Writing C for a consonant, V for a vowel, and VV for a long vowel or diphthong, the three lengths are as follows:

- Short: CV, e.g. ke, na.
- Long: CVV or CVC, e.g. nī, gof, 'ā, mey.
- Overlong: CVVC, CVCC, CVVCC, e.g. kār, dast, dūst. (Exceptions: syllables ending in ān, īn, ūn usually count as long, not overlong.)

In Persian, the three lengths of syllable are referred to as kūtāh, boland, and derāz respectively.

At the end of a verse or half-line, the distinction between short, long, and overlong syllables is neutralised. Thus at the end of a line the syllables to, jā, and dūst are all counted as a single long syllable without distinction of length.

=== Overlong syllables ===
An overlong syllable can be substituted anywhere in a line where the metre has a long plus a short syllable (– u), and also at the beginning of the line where the metre has (x u).

Overlong syllables not only add beauty to the line but also variety, since whenever an overlong syllable is used (except at line-end), the number of syllables is reduced. Thus in the first half of the following couplet from Saadi's Golestān, the metre (4.5.11), which normally has eleven syllables, is reduced to eight. In the second line, there are 9 syllables, because in addition to the overlong syllable in dūstī, the final u u – of the line is replaced by – –. The overlong syllables are underlined in the transliteration:

یار ناپایدار دوست مدار
دوستی را نشاید این غدار

yār-e nāpāydār dūst madār
dūstī-rā na-šāyad īn qaddār

– u – –u –u –u u –
–u – – u – u – – –

'Do not love a friend who is not steadfast;
this traitor is not worthy of friendship.'

When Persian poetry is recited, the three lengths of syllable, "short", "long", and "overlong" take different lengths of time to say. In an experiment, L. P. Elwell-Sutton recorded two well-educated Persian speakers reading a number of poems and measured the length of each syllable in hundredths of a second. Although the length of the syllables was variable (for example, a short syllable could be anything from 0.07 to 0.65 seconds), the average of the two speakers combined was as follows: short syllables 0.21 seconds, long syllables 0.33 seconds, overlong syllables 0.59 seconds.

In the traditional Turkish and Indian method of pronouncing Persian poetry, an overlong syllable is followed by a short anaptyctic vowel, known as nīm-fathe ('half-"a"'), (for example, dūs^{a}tī 'friendship'), but in Iran this vowel is not usually used. However, there are a few words, such as ās(e)mān 'heaven', or yād(e)gār 'memorial', where both pronunciations are allowed in dictionaries. Some names, such as that of Yazdgerd III, the final king of the Sassanid empire, are exceptions to this trend in that they are almost always pronounced with a short anaptyctic vowel, either the nīm-fathe ('half-"a"') (i.e. Yazd-a-gerd) or mostly in the modern Iranian pronunciation, the nīm-kasreh ('half-"e"') (i.e. Yazd-e-gerd).

=== Minor rules of prosody ===
==== 'Eyn and alef ====
The letter 'eyn (ع), which is pronounced as a glottal stop in Persian, is always counted in poetry as a consonant, e.g. 'ešq عشق 'love'. Thus like any other consonant it can cause the previous syllable to become long, so that از عشق az 'ešq 'from love' has the scansion – –u.

The letter alef (ا) at the beginning of a word, on the other hand, can either be pronounced as a glottal stop, or ignored in scansion. Thus in Hafez's line beginning اگر آن ترک شیرازی agar 'ān Tork-e Šīrāzī 'if that Shirazi Turk', the glottal stop at the beginning of the word آن 'ān 'that' is pronounced and the scansion is u – – – u – – –. But in most cases the alef is silent and has no effect on the length of the previous syllable. Different poets have different preferences in this; for example, verses where the alef is observed as a glottal stop are much more common in Rumi than in Sa'di. The word ast 'is' and other parts of the verb "to be" are always pronounced without a glottal stop; and there is also no glottal stop after a verbal prefix, for example bar-āmad 'came up'.

==== Ezāfe and final vowels ====
The unwritten ezāfe suffix (as in Tork-e Šīrāzī 'Shirazi Turk') may be pronounced either long or short (-e or -ē), as the metre requires, and the word o 'and' similarly may be either o or ō.

Words ending in short vowels, such as na 'neither', to 'you', xāne 'house', can also have the final vowel lengthened where convenient. When lengthened, these vowels do not change their quality, so that na is pronounced [næ:] rather than [nɑ:].

When the sound ī (written ی) is followed directly by another vowel in Persian words, as in بیا biyā 'come', it is pronounced short, and similarly with the sounds ey and ow when they are followed by a vowel; for example mey-ē bāqī 'the remaining wine', bešnow az ney 'listen to the flute', bīni ān Tork 'do you see that Turk?', where mey, now, and -ni are all short syllables, as required by the metre. However, the prefixes bī- 'without' and mī- (the prefix making continuous tenses) are never shortened.

==== Alternative pronunciations ====
Different pronunciations of other words can also be used where convenient, for example, the word for 'from' can be 'az, az, ze or z-; 'if' can be agar, gar or ar; 'hungry' can be gorsne or gorosne, and so on. The words va, ze, and ke ('who', 'that', 'since') are often joined on to the next word, e.g. v-agar 'and if', z-īn 'from this', k-az 'since from'.

In some words, a long vowel can be shortened (e.g. gonāh 'sin' can become gonah, dīgar 'other' can become degar). When this happens, the vowel quality changes.

==== Silent vāv ====
The silent letter vāv (و) which sometimes follows the letter xe (خ) in Persian words (e.g. خواب x(w)āb 'sleep') is ignored in scansion.

==== Arabic words ====
Lines of Arabic are sometimes included in Persian poems. The Arabic is pronounced with Persian phonology (for example, ض and ظ are both pronounced z), and unless the whole poem is Arabic, the metre is Persian.

== Word accent and metre ==
The word accent in Persian (which is pronounced as a combination of high pitch and stress) at first sight does not affect the metre. In the following couplet of Hāfez, for example, although the two verses are parallel in structure, the word accent (which generally is heard on the last syllable of each word) comes three times on short syllables in the first verse, but three times on long syllables in the second verse. The accent is shown here by transcribing the accented vowels in bold:

زلف‌آشفته و خوی‌کرده و خندان‌لب و مست
پیرهن‌چاک و غزل‌خوان و صراحی در دست

zolf-'āšofte-vo xoy-karde-vo xandān-lab-o mast
pīrhan-čāk-o qazal-xān-o sorāhī dar dast

x u – – | u u – – | u u – – | u u –

'Hair-tousled, perspiring, smiling-lipped, and drunk,
shirt torn, singing songs, and wine-flask in hand'

However, the word accent cannot be entirely disregarded. In metres with the rhythms | u – – – | or | – – u – |, there is a clear tendency for the word-accent to be on the 2nd and 4th syllables of the feet. The possibility remains that each metre has a "natural" pattern of stress, which is deviated from deliberately to create interest and tension.

== Division into feet ==
The Arabic prosodists divide the lines of verse up into "feet" or "prosodic words" (rukn or rokn, pl. arkān) of three to five syllables each; thus the metre of the Shahnameh is divided as | u – – | u – – | u – – | u – |, pronounced as fa'ūlun fa'ūlun fa'ūlun fa'ūl, using made up words derived from the Arabic verb فعل fʾl 'to do'. (See Arabic prosody.)

=== Internal rhyme ===
With some Persian metres, especially those of patterns 1, 2 and 3, it is easy to see where such division into feet should be made. In some cases the division is made clear by internal rhyme, for example:

zamānē bar-ārad bahānē be mard
| u – – | u – – || u – – | u – |

bedeh sāqī mey-ē bāqī ke dar jennat na-xāhī yāft
| u – – – | u – – – || u – – – | u – – – |

čang-e ū dar čang-e ū hamčūn xamīdē 'āšeq-ī
– u – | – – u – || – – u – | – – u – |

na be dīdār o be dīnār o be sūd ō be ziān
| u u – – | u u – – || u u – – | u u – |

tā to nān-ī be-kaf ārī o be qeflat na-xorī
| – u – – | u u – – || u u – – | u u – |

ze balāhā-ye mo'azzam na-xorad qam, na-xorad qam
| u u – – | u u – – || u u – – | u u – – |

xīzīd o xaz ārīd ke hengām-e xazān ast
| – – | u u – – || u u – – | u u – – |

ham qadah-ī ham farah-ī ham šab-e mā-rā sahar-ī
| – u u – | – u u – || – u u – | – u u – |

če pāsbān o če soltān, če hūšyār o če mast
| u – u – | u u – – || u – u – | u u – |

ham parde-ye mā bedrīd * ham towbe-ye mā beškast
– | – u u – | – – || – | – u u – | – – |

According to Thiesen, internal rhyme almost always coincides with the end of a foot.

=== Sentence-breaks ===
In some metres the division into feet is uncontroversial, such as the following, where the same pattern is repeated four times:

| x u – – | u u – – | u u – – | u u – – |

In metres of this kind sentence-breaks (such as the point where a subordinate clause begins, or where a postponed subject comes after a verb) tend to come at the end of a foot, especially at the mid-point of the line. However, sometimes such breaks are found elsewhere, one common place being after the eleventh syllable in the above metre. Different poets differ in their style. In the above metre, a sentence-break at the mid-point of the line is particularly common in Rumi, being found in 75% of the lines examined in a study by Jeannine Heny, whereas in Saadi it came at this place in only 25% of the lines.

=== Type of feet ===
Where the division into feet is uncontroversial, the preference is usually for feet which end in a heavy syllable. Thus in the second pattern, the feet u – – – , – u – – , – – u – exist, but – – – u is not found. There is also a preference for feet of four syllables, rather than three or five; thus the kāmil metre (common in Arabic) with its repeated five-syllable foot of u u – u – does not easily fit into the Persian metrical system and is almost never found.

=== The ruba'i ===
Although the division into feet is often clear, in other cases, especially with the compound metres of patterns 4 and 5, it is less obvious. Elwell-Sutton therefore left the metres undivided. For example, the traditional foot division for the ruba'i metre (5.1.13) is as follows:

| – – u | u – u – | u – – u | u – |

The phonologist Bruce Hayes proposed dividing it as follows:

| – – u u | – u – u | – – u u | – |

But Masoud Farzaad, followed by Thiesen, divided it as follows:

| – | – u u – || u – u – | – u u – |

This seems better to fit the way a ruba'i is actually composed, since there is often a phrase-break (or potential pause) at the point that Farzaad marks with ||. He refers to this point as the "hinge" of the line.

In the ruba'i the rhythm after the "hinge" can be either – u or u –. The same choice is sometimes found in early poets in the metre 3.4.7(2) in the same way after the break:

| x x u – | – u – || x x u – | – u – |

=== Biceps elements ===
In metres where a line ends with the sequence u u –, as in the above ruba'i metre, the two short syllables are often replaced with a single long syllable. This replacement is also found in the first half of the line, but much less commonly. In a sample of 200 lines taken from the ruba'i metres, Elwell-Sutton found that the final u u – became – – in 50% of lines, the first u u – became – – in 5% of lines, and for the middle u u – there were no examples.

When the rhythm u u – is replaced by – – in the first half of the line, there is usually a phrase boundary or potential pause after the second long syllable. The following line from a ruba'i is typical:

goftā, šeyxā, || har ānče gū'ī hastam
– | – – – || u – u – | – – – |
She said, o Sheikh! I am what you say I am.

The biceps ending – u u – is also sometimes found in Arabic poetry, in the basīṭ metre, for example in poems written by the poet Abu Nuwas, who was of half-Persian origin.

== Rhyme ==
Persian poems always use rhyme, and from the point of view of rhyme can be classified into various types:

- Poems in rhyming couplets, each couplet with a different rhyme, thus with the scheme AA BB CC. A poem of this type is known as a masnavi (plural masnavīyāt). The poems in rhyming couplets can be of any length from a single couplet to long poems such as Ferdowsi's Shahnameh, which is over 50,000 couplets long, or Rumi's Masnavi-ye Ma'navi "Spiritual Masnavi", of over 25,000 couplets.
- Lyric poems, in which, apart from the first line, the two halves of each verse do not rhyme, but the same rhyme is used at the end of every verse throughout the poem, thus AA BA CA. Among lyric poems with a single rhyme throughout, the two most common forms are the ghazal (a short poem usually about love) and the qasida (which is longer, and may be over 100 verses). The short ruba'i (quatrain) and do-bayti, which usually have the rhyme scheme AA BA, also belong to this type.
- Stanzaic poems, which have rhyme schemes such as AAABB CCCBB DDDBB, and so on. Stanzaic poems first seem to have been introduced in the 11th century by such poets as Farrokhi and Manuchehri.
- Very short poems (typically of two lines) which are included in works such as Saadi's Golestan. In these, the rhyme-scheme AB CB is typical, but AB AB, AA BB, and AA AA are also found.

Persian rhymes often consist of a single syllable, for example māh / siyāh; but there are also plenty of instances of longer rhymes, such sāzande / navāzande or pūyandagān / gūyandagān. Following the actual rhyming word there may be a radīf, which is a word or series of words that is repeated after every rhyme, for example šekāyat mīkonad / hekāyat mīkonad (Rumi). As well as the main rhyme, there may also be additional internal rhymes in a verse.

Persian rhyme sometimes provides evidence of an earlier pronunciation of the language. For example, in Saadi's poem "Cloud and wind" quoted below, the word naxorī rhymes with nabarī, presumably because in Saadi's day, at least in poetry, the first word was pronounced naxwarī.

A feature of classical Persian pronunciation which is no longer observed in Iran today is the distinction between long ō and ū, and between ē and ī; for example, šēr 'lion' vs. šīr 'milk'. These days in Iran ō and ū are both pronounced ū, and ē and ī are both pronounced ī. However, in classical times they were pronounced differently; for example, the indefinite article suffix -ē did not rhyme with -ī 'you are'. The original pronunciation of these vowels can still be heard in eastern traditions, such as those of Tajikistan, Afghanistan, and India. (See Persian phonology.)

== A table of common metres ==
The list of metres below is based on the one in Elwell-Sutton's The Persian Metres. The patterns are read from left to right. u = short syllable; – = long syllable; x = either long or short. – u or x u may be replaced by an overlong syllable (–u); an overlong syllable may also used as the final syllable of any verse, but if so, it counts simply as long.

The sign (M) after a metre indicates one of the seven metres traditionally used in masnaviyat (long poems in rhyming couplets such as Ferdowsi's Shahnameh or Rumi's mystical Masnavi). Except for one metre in 10 syllables, all the masnavi metres have 11 syllables, a feature that may date to pre-Islamic times, since 11-syllable metre seems to have been common at that time.

The sign (R) indicates one of the two metres used in making rubā'iyāt (quatrains). These two metres (5.1.13 and 3.3.13), which are really variations of the same metre, are used only for rubā'iyāt. Very similar to the ruba'i is the do-baytī, which uses the metre 5.1.11.

The frequency column shows the percentage of lyric poems in each metre, out of a sample of over 20,000 poems, as counted by L. P. Elwell-Sutton. Since this covers only lyric poems, it omits masnavīyāt and robā'īyāt.

For lyric poems, the metres of pattern 4 (43.8%) are the most common, followed by pattern 2 (27.6%) and pattern 3 (19.7%). Pattern 5 (5.4%) and pattern 1 (3.3%) are less frequently used, and metres in patterns other than the normal five are used in only 0.2% of the poems Elwell-Sutton examined.

The traditional Arabic names are given in their Persian pronunciation.

Pattern	Scansion	Arabic	Code	Frequency
1	u – – u – – u – – u –	Motaqāreb	1.1.11 (M)	1.9%
1	u – – u – – u – – u – –	Motaqāreb	1.1.12	1.3%
2	u – – – u – – – u – –	Hazaj	2.1.11 (M)	4.6%
2	u – – – u – – – u – – – u – – –	Hazaj	2.1.16 = 2.1.8(2)	6.0%
2	– – u – – – u – – – u – – – u –	Rajaz	2.3.16 = 2.3.8(2)	1.2%
2	– u – – – u – – – u –	Ramal	2.4.11 (M)	3.2%
2	– u – – – u – – – u – – – u –	Ramal	2.4.15	12.2%
2	– u – – – u – – – u – – – u – –	Ramal	2.4.16	0.2%
3	x u – – u u – – u u –	Ramal	3.1.11 (M)	1.1%
3	x u – – u u – – u u – – u u –	Ramal	3.1.15	9.7%
3	x u – – u u – – u u – – u u – –	Ramal	3.1.16	0.3%
3	– – u u – – u u – – u u –	Hazaj	3.3.13 (R)	–
3	– – u u – – u u – – u u – –	Hazaj	3.3.14	5.7%
3	– – u u – – – | – – u u – – –	Hazaj	3.3.7(2)	1.3%
3	– u u – – u – | – u u – – u –	Monsareh	3.4.7(2) = 4.4.7(2)	
3	– u u – – u u – – u –	Sarī'	3.4.11 (M)	1.1%
3	– u u – – u u – – u u – – u u –	Sarī'	3.4.16	0.1%
4	u – u – u u – – u – u – u u –	Mojtass	4.1.15	12.9%
4	u – u – u u – – u – u – u u – –	Mojtass	4.1.16	0.7%
4	– u u – – u – u – u u – –	Monsareh	4.4.13	1.0%
4	– u u – – u – u – u u – – u –	Monsareh	4.4.15	1.2%
4	– u u – – u – | – u u – – u –	Monsareh	4.4.7(2) = 3.4.7(2)	
4	x u – – u – u – u u –	Xafīf	4.5.11 (M)	8.9%
4	– – u – u – u u – – –	Mozāre'	4.7.11	0.3%
4	– – u – u – u u – – u – u –	Mozāre'	4.7.14	13.2%
4	– – u – u – u u – – u – u – –	Mozāre'	4.7.15	2.0%
4	– – u – u – – | – – u – u – –	Mozāre'	4.7.7(2)	
5	– – u u – u – u – –	Hazaj	5.1.10 (M)	3.2%
5	– – u u – u – u – – –	Hazaj	5.1.11	0.7%
5	– – u u – u – u – – u u –	Hazaj	5.1.13 (R)	–
5	– u u – u – u – – u u – u – u –	Rajaz	5.2.16	0.8%
5	u u – u – u – – u u – u – u – –	Ramal	5.3.16	0.6%

Pattern 4.1 can be seen as being derived from pattern 3.1 by the reversal (or "syncopation"/anaclasis) of the 2nd and 3rd syllables.

Pattern 5.1 can be seen as being derived from pattern 3.3 by the reversal of the 6th and 7th syllables.

== Catalexis ==
The final syllable of a line always counts as long because of the pause which follows; so when a metre is catalectic (that is, when it loses its final syllable), a short syllable in the pattern automatically becomes long. An example is 3.4.11:

| – u u – | – u u – | – u – |

The metre 3.4.07(2), which has a pause internally, is catalectic in both halves of the line:

| – u u – | – u – || – u u – | – u – |

This can be compared with the full version of the same metre, 3.4.16:

| – u u – | – u u – | – u u – | – u u – |

The commonly used mojtass metre (4.1.15) is another catalectic metre, since it is made up of two sections, 8 and 7 syllables long, often with a break between:

| u – u – | u u – – || u – u – | u u – |

It has been argued that metres can be shortened at the beginning as well as at the end of the line. For example, the khafīf metre (4.5.11) is simply the mojtass (4.1.15) with the first foot removed:

| x u – – | u – u – | u u – |

== Examples of the metres from Persian poets ==
In the section below, examples are given of some well known poems in various of the above metres. The transliteration is based on that approved by the United Nations in 2012, which represents the current pronunciation of educated speakers in Iran, except that to make scansion easier, the long vowels are marked (ā, ē, ī, ō, ū). (See Romanization of Persian.) The glottal stop is written ('). x = kh (as in "Khayyām").

To help with reading the lines, overlong syllables are underlined in the transcriptions below. These are pronounced longer than the usual long syllables

=== Pattern 1 (motaqāreb) ===
The first pattern, based on the foot u – –, is known by the Arabic name mutaqārib (motaqāreb). It is found in only two metres, 1.1.11 and 1.1.12. The first of these is mostly used for masnavī (rhyming couplet) poems, but also occasionally for monorhyme lyric poems.

==== Ferdowsi's Shahnameh ====
The metre 1.1.11 is one of the earliest to be found in Persian poetry of the Islamic period and is one of the seven metres used to make the long poems known as masnavi. It is most famously used for the 50,000-line epic poem the Shahnameh of Ferdowsi, completed c. AD 1010, which begins:

به نام خداوند جان و خرد
کزین برتر اندیشه برنگذرد

be nām-ē Xodāvand-e jān ō xerad
k-az-īn bartar andīše bar-na-gzarad

| u – – | u – – | u – – | u – |

'In the name of the Lord of the soul and intellect,
since higher than this, thought cannot pass.'

==== Saadi's Bustan ====
Saadi's long poem the Būstān, completed in 1257, is also written in this metre. The first line is as follows:

به نام خدایی که جان آفرید
سخن گفتن اندر زبان آفرید

be nām-ē Xodā-yī ke jān āfarīd
soxan goftan andar zabān āfarīd

| u – – | u – – | u – – | u – |

'In the name of that God who created the soul,
who created speaking in the tongue.'

==== Banī 'Ādam ====
The same metre 1.1.11 can also be used for shorter poems such as Saadi's well-known lines below from the Golestān, which are inscribed on a carpet that hangs in the United Nations in New York:

بنى‌آدم اعضای یک پیکرند
که در آفرینش ز یک گوهرند
چو عضوى به درد آورَد روزگار
دگر عضوها را نمانَد قرار
تو کز محنت دیگران بی‌غمی
نشاید که نامت نهند آدمی

banī-'Ādam a'zā-ye yek peykar-and
ke dar 'āfarīn-eš ze yek gowhar-and
čo ʾozv-ī be dard āvarad rūzgār
degar 'ozv-hā-rā na-mānad qarār
to k-az mehnat-ē dīgarān bīqam-ī
na-šāyad ke nām-at nahand ādamī

| u – – | u – – | u – – | u – |

'The sons of Adam are members of one body,
since in his creation they are of one essence.
when fate brings one member pain
the other members are affected.
You, who are without sorrow at others' affliction,
it is not fitting that they should call you by the name "human".'

The first line is also commonly quoted in the form (see Bani Adam):

بنى‌آدم اعضای یکدیگرند
banī-'Ādam a'zā-ye yek dīgar-and
'The sons of Adam are members of one another'.

=== Pattern 2.1 (hazaj) ===
==== The Shirazi Turk ====
Pattern 2.1, commonly known as hazaj, is similar to pattern 1 except that the short syllable is followed not by two but by three long syllables. The metre 2.1.16 is used for the following poem by Hafez. It has been referred to by Michael Hillmann as "the most familiar of Hafez's poems in the English-speaking world". As sometimes happens with the longer metres, there is a break in the middle of the line; however, the break is not a complete one, since in some lines an overlong syllable or a word followed by the ezāfe suffix (-e) continues across the break.

اگر آن ترک شیرازی به دست آرد دل ما را
به خال هندویش بخشم سمرقند و بخارا را

'agar 'ān Tork-e Šīrāzī * be dast ārad del-ē mā-rā
be xāl-ē Hendu-yaš baxšam * Samarqand-ō Boxārā-rā

| u – – – | u – – – || u – – – | u – – – |

'If that Shirazi Turk wins my heart,
for his Indian mole I will give Samarkand and Bukhara.'

==== Neither a Christian nor a Jew ====
Rumi uses this same metre in the following ghazal from the Dīvān-e Shams:

چه تدبیر ای مسلمانان که من خود را نمیدانم
نه ترسا و یهودیم نه گبرم نه مسلمانم

če tadbīr, ey mosalmānān? * ke man xod-rā nemī-dānam
na tarsā vō yahūdī-yam, * na gabr-am naː mosalmān-am

| u – – – | u – – – || u – – – | u – – – |

'What am I to do, o Muslims? Since I do not know myself;
I am not a Christian or a Jew, nor a Zoroastrian, nor a Muslim.'

==== Nezami's Khosrow and Shirin ====
An eleven-syllable form of this pattern, 2.1.11 (that is, omitting the first foot), is one of the two metres considered appropriate for writing masnavi poems on the theme of love. Examples include Fakhruddin Gurgani's Vis o Ramin, and Nezami's Khusrow o Shirin, which begins as follows:

خداوندا در توفیق بگشای
نظامی را ره تحقیق بنمای

Xodāvandā dar-ē towfīq begšāy
Nezāmī-rā rah-ē tahqīq benmāy

| u – – – | u – – – | u – – |

'O God, open the door of success;
Show Nezami the way of investigation'

==== Do-bayti ====
The same metre 2.1.11, or hazaj, was used from early times in popular poetry, such as the do-baytī, in which the opening iamb (u –) can sometimes be replaced by – – or – u. A do bayti is a quatrain, but in a different metre from the ruba'i; like the ruba'i its rhyme scheme is AA BA. The theme of love is evident in examples such as the following by Baba Taher:

اگر یار مرا دیدی به خلوت
بگو ای بی‌وفا ای بیمروت
گریبانم ز دستت چاک چاکو
نخواهم دوخت تا روز قیامت

agar yār-ē ma-rā dīdī be xalvat
begū 'ey bī-vafā, 'ey bī-morovvat
gerībān-am ze dast-at čāk čākū
na-xāham dūxt tā rūz-ē qiyāmat

| u – – – | u – – – | u – – |

'If you see my beloved in private
Say, 'O faithless one! O without humanity!
My collar has been torn to pieces by your hand;
I will not sew it up until the day of resurrection.'

For another example, see the article Do-bayti.

==== Googoosh's Bridge ====
The Hazaj metre 2.1.11 is still in popular use today, for example in the modern Iranian pop song Pol ("Bridge") by the singer Googoosh, which begins:

برای خواب معصومانهء عشق
کمک کن بستری از گل بسازیم

barā-yē xāb-e ma'sūmāne-yē 'ešq
komak kon bestar-ī 'az gol besāzīm

| u – – – | u – – – | u – – |

'For the innocent sleep of love
Help us build a bed of flowers'

The modern version of this metre has some licences compared with the classical one. For example, three of the verses of the song have a short syllable in the third position ( u – u – | u – – – | u – –); and overlong syllables are not observed.

The 11-syllable version of this metre may be compared with the Vedic triṣṭubh, which is similar.

=== Pattern 2.3 (rajaz) ===
==== The drum of departure ====
A different version of this pattern, 2.3.8(2), known as rajaz, is used by Rumi in the following ghazal. As with 2.1.8(2) illustrated above, there is a break in the middle of the line:

ای عاشقان ای عاشقان * هنگام کوچ است از جهان
در گوش جانم می رسد * طبل رحیل از آسمان

'ey 'āšeqān 'ey 'āšeqān, * hengām-e kūč ast az jahān
dar gūš-e jān-am mīrasad * tabl-ē rahīl az 'āsmān

| – – u – | – – u – || – – u – | – – u – |

'O lovers, o lovers, it is the time for setting off from the world;
into the ear of my soul there comes the drum of departure from heaven.'

The division of this metre into four parts, each 8 syllables long, is reminiscent of the anustubh or shloka, the most commonly used metre of Indian poetry.

==== A Buddha from Farkhar ====
With this metre there is frequently an internal rhyme at the mid-point of the line, as in the poem above, or in the following by Khwaju Kermani:

شیراز ترکستان شده * کان بت ز فرخار آمده
Šīrāz Torkestān šode * k'ān bot ze Farxār āmade

| – –u – | – – u – || – – u – | – – u – |

'Shiraz has become Turkistan * since that "Buddha" has come from Farkhar'

The statues of Buddha from northern Afghanistan were proverbial for their beauty. It is surmised that the handsome young Turk praised here was the prototype of Hafez's "Shirazi Turk" in his poem written a few years later.

=== Pattern 2.4 (ramal) ===
==== Jūy-e Mūliyān ====
The metre 2.4.11, known as ramal, is used for a famous poem by Rudaki (9th–10th century), one of the earliest recorded in classical Persian. Although this metre is often used for rhyming couplet poems (masnavīyāt), Rudaki's poem is a ghazal with the same rhyme throughout. The first couplet is notable for its assonance of ū ... ū ... ū in the first half, balanced by ā ... ā ... ā in the second:

بوی جوی مولیان آید همی
یاد یار مهربان آید همی

bū-ye jūy-ē Mūliyān āyad hamī
yād-e yār-ē mehrabān āyad hamī

– u – – | – u – – | – u –

'The scent of the Muliyan stream comes constantly;
the memory of my dear friend comes constantly'

It is said that when the king, Rudaki's patron Nasr II, heard this poem, he immediately leapt on a horse and rode directly from Herat to Bukhara.

==== Attar's Conference of the Birds ====
The same metre 2.4.11 is used in masnavi poems, such as Attār's allegorical Sufi poem Manteq-ot-Teyr or Conference of the Birds, completed in AD 1177:

مرحبا ای هدهد هادی شده
در حقیقت پیک هر وادی شده

marhabā 'ey hodhod-ē hādī šode
dar haqīqat peyk-e har vādī šode

| – u – – | – u – – | – u – |

'Welcome, O hoopoe, who hast been made our guide,
who hast been made in truth the messenger of each valley.'

==== Rumi's Mystical Masnavi ====
Because of its use in mystical poems by Attar, the 11-syllable ramal became associated particularly with poems on a mystical theme. The most famous of these was the Masnavi-e Ma'navī, or the "Spiritual Masnavi", completed in 1273, of Mowlana Jalal al-Din Rumi (better known in Iran as Mowlavī) of about 25,000 couplets, which begins:

بشنو از نی چون شکایت می‌کند
از جداییها حکایت می‌کند

bešnow az ney čūn šekāyat mīkonad
az jodāīhā hekāyat mīkonad

| – u – – | – u – – | – u – |

'Listen to the reed, how it makes complaint;
It tells the story of separations.'

==== Breast brimful of pain ====
The same 15-syllable ramal metre, 2.4.15, was used in several poems by Hafez, including the following on a mystical theme:

سینه مالامال درد است ای دریغا مرهمی
دل ز تنهایی به جان آمد خدا را همدمی

sīne mālāmāl-e dard ast; ey deriqā, marham-ī
del ze tanhā'ī be jān āmad, Xodā-rā, hamdam-ī

| – u – – | – u – – | – u – – | – u – |

My breast is brimful of pain; alas, a remedy!
My heart is dying of loneliness, for God's sake, (send) a companion!

==== The Turkish harpist ====
The same metre, 2.4.15, is also used in the following qasida by the 11th-century poet Manuchehri in praise of a beautiful minstrel. However, in many of the lines the internal rhymes and word breaks suggest a different division of feet:

بینی آن ترکی که او چون برزند بر چنگ، چنگ
از دل ابدال بگریزد به صد فرسنگ، سنگ

bīni ān Tork-ī ke ū čūn barzanad bar čang čang
az del-ē abdāl bogrīzad be sad farsang sang?

| – u – | – – u – | – – u – | – – u – | or
| – u – – | – u – – | – u – – | – u – |

'Do you see that Turk who, when he places his hand (čang) on the harp (čang),
from the hearts of men of god flees a hundred leagues their wit?'

The poem has 31 verses all rhyming in -ang, imitating the sound of a harp. At the end of the line, the syllable čang, theoretically overlong, is scanned simply as long.

=== Pattern 3 ===
Pattern 3, based on the rhythm u u – –. This rhythm is not found in Arabic, and it may well go back to ancient Persian times, since it was associated by the Ancient Greeks with Asia Minor and Persia, and known as persicus or ionicus. It was used for example in the opening chorus of Aeschylus's play The Persians.

Whenever a poem begins with u u – –, the first foot may be replaced by – u – – or –u – –, and in fact this change occurs in about 80% of poems, with slight differences from one poet to another. It is also quite common for the final u u – to become – –, although substitution of a long for two shorts in other places in the line is rare.

Poems of pattern 3, when set to music, are often in three-time rhythm.

Because the foot used, fa'elāton, is similar to the fā'elāton of pattern 2.4 above, this rhythm is likewise known as ramal. However, to distinguish it from 2.4, it is known as ramal-e maxbūn (literally "hemmed ramal", on the analogy of a tailor shortening a dress by hemming it).

==== Cloud and wind ====
An example of 3.1.15 is the following poem, which comes from the introduction to Saadi's Golestān:

ابر و باد و مه و خورشید و فلک در کارند
تا تو نانی به کف آریّ و به غفلت نخوری
همه از بهر تو سرگشته و فرمان بردار
شرط انصاف نباشد که تو فرمان نبری

abr o bād ō mah o xorshīd o falak dar kār-and
tā to nān-ī be kaf ārī yo be qeflat na-xorī
hame 'az bahr-e to sargašte vo farmān-bordār
šart-e 'ensāf na-bāšad ke to farmān na-barī

| – u – – | u u – – | u u – – | – – |
| – u – – | u u – – | u u – – | u u – |
| u u – – | u u – – | u u – – | – – |
| – u – – | u u – – | u u – – | u u – |

'Cloud and wind and moon and sun and firmament are at work
so that you may get some bread in your hand and not eat it neglectfully.
All for your sake are perplexed and obedient to command;
it is not a fair condition that you should not obey the command.'

The metre requires the second o 'and' in the first line above to be pronounced long. This in effect separates into two groups "cloud and wind" on the one hand and the astronomical "moon and sun and firmament" on the other. Another adaptation to the metre is Saadi's use of the form مه mah for 'moon' instead of the usual ماه māh.

==== Wine-flask in hand ====
The same metre 3.1.15 is found in some of Hafez's ghazals, such as this one:

زلف آشفته و خوی کرده و خندان لب و مست
پیرهن چاک و غزل خوان و صراحی در دست

zolf-'āšofte vo xoy-karde vo xandān-lab o mast
pīrhan-čāk o qazal-xān o sorāhī dar dast

| x u – – | u u – – | u u – – | u u – |
| x u – – | u u – – | u u – – | – – |

'Hair-tousled, perspiring, smiling-lipped, and drunk,
shirt torn, singing songs, and wine-flask in hand'

The ending u u – can freely alternate with – –, as in the metre 4.1.15.

==== Turkish national anthem ====
This metre is also used in formal Ottoman Turkish poetry, for example in the Turkish national anthem, the İstiklâl Marşı written in 1921 by Mehmet Akif Ersoy, though the effect in Turkish is different:

قورقما! سونمز بو شفقلرده یوزن آل صانجاق
سونمه دن یوردیمڭ اوستنده توتن اڭ صوڭ اوجاق

Korkma! sönmez bu şafaklarda yüzen 'al sancak;
Sönmeden yurdumun üstünde tüten 'en son ocak.

| x u – – | u u – – | u u – – | – – |
| x u – – | u u – – | u u – – | u u – |

'Fear not! for the crimson banner that proudly ripples in this glorious dawn shall not fade,
Before the last fiery hearth that is ablaze within my homeland is extinguished.'

In Ottoman Turkish, the vowels of native Turkish words are generally treated as short (except by an occasional licence called imâle), so long syllables are those closed by a consonant. Persian words scan in the same way as in Persian poetry.

Neither of the tunes composed for the Turkish National Anthem, in 1924 and 1930, follows the metre in any way, however.

==== Arise and bring fur ====
Another metre of the 3rd pattern is 3.3.14. This is one syllable longer than the roba'i metre, and starts in a similar way, but the foot division differs, according to Farzaad. In this metre there is often a word-break after the sixth syllable, whereas in the roba'i it is more often after the 5th. As Farzaad divides it, 3.3.14 is really a variation of 3.1.16, but with the first two syllables omitted.

In the example below by the 11th-century poet Manuchehri, the two short syllables are kept constant and not replaced by a single long:

خیزید و خز آرید که هنگام خزان است
باد خنک از جانب خوارزم وزان است

xīzīd-o xaz ārīd ke hengām-e xazān ast
bād-ē xonok az jāneb-e Xārazm vazān ast

| – – | u u – – | u u – – | u u – – |

'Arise and bring fur as autumn is here
A cold wind is blowing from the direction of Khwarazm.'

The poem is stanzaic, consisting of 35 stanzas of 3 couplets each. For the remainder of the above stanza, see Manuchehri.

When the singer Giti sings this poem to a modern tune, the music is in triple time with the downbeat on the final syllable of the above feet. (See External links below.)

To fit the metre, the ezāfe suffix -e is pronounced long in bād-ē but short in jāneb-e.

==== Cup in hand ====
The metre 3.3.07(2) starts in the same way as 3.3.14, but the line is broken into two separate halves. An example is a poem of the 13th-century mystic poet Iraqi:

از پرده برون آمد ساقی قدحی در دست
هم پردهٔ ما بدرید، هم توبهٔ ما بشکست
بنمود رخ زیبا، گشتیم همه شیدا
چون هیچ نماند از ما آمد بر ما بنشست

az parde borūn āmad * sāqī qadah-ī dar dast
ham parde-ye mā bedrīd * ham towbe-ye mā beškast
benmūd rox-ē zībā * gaštīm hamē šeydā
čūn hīč na-mānd az mā * āmad bar-e mā benšast

– | – u u – | – – || – | – u u – | – – |

'From behind the curtain came out the wine-pourer, a cup in hand;
He both tore our curtain, and broke our resolution.
He showed his beautiful face, we all became insane;
When nothing remained of us, he came and sat down beside us.'

The opening lines of this poem are imitated in Hafez's ghazals 26 (Zolf-'āšofte) and 27.

==== Drunk without wine ====
Based on the pattern – u u – (which the Ancient Greeks knew as a choriamb) is the metre 3.4.11, which is found in the following poem by Rumi. Theoretically the pattern, when 11 syllables long, would require the ending – u u, but since the last syllable of a line always counts as long, the ending becomes – u –:

مرد خدا مست بود بی شراب
مرد خدا سیر بود بی کباب

mard-e Xodā mast bovad bī šarāb
mard-e Xodā sīr bovad bī kabāb

| – u u – | –u u – | – u – |

'The man of God is intoxicated without wine;
the man of God is satisfied without meat.'

==== Whoever sees a sweetheart ====
The following metre, 3.4.7(2) consists of the first seven syllables of the above metre repeated. It could also be classified as 4.4.7(2). It is exemplified by the following ghazal (love poem) by Saadi:

هر که دلارام دید* از دلش آرام رفت
چشم ندارد خلاص * هر که در این دام رفت

har ke delārām dīd * az del-aš ārām raft
čašm nadārad xalās * har ke dar īn dām raft

| – u u – | – u – || – u u – | – u – |

'Whoever sees a sweetheart, from his heart peace disappears.
and none who falls into this trap can hope for freedom.'

The second syllable of xalās, which comes just before the break in the middle of the verse, is theoretically overlong, but just as if it came at the end of a verse, it is scanned simply as long.

Very occasionally in early poets such as Rudaki, the foot | u – u – | may be substituted for | – u u – | in this metre, as in the ruba'i.

=== Pattern 4 ===
==== Tongue cut out ====
One of the most common lyric metres is 4.1.15, known as mojtass. It is the 3rd most common metre in Saadi's Golestān, accounting for 77 short poems. An example is the following:

زبان بریده بکنجی نشسته صمٌّ بکمٌ
به از کسی که نباشد زبانش اندر حکم

zabān-borīde be konj-ī nešaste sommon bokm
beh az kas-ī ke nabāšad zabān-aš 'andar hokm

| u – u – | u u – – || u – u – | u u – |

'A person sitting in a corner with his tongue cut out, deaf and dumb,
is better than one whose tongue is not in control.'

In this metre, as in the similar metre 3.1.15, the final u u – can be replaced by – –. In poems like the above, there is often a word-break in the middle of the half-line at the point marked ||.

==== A red rose has bloomed ====
The metre 4.1.15 is also used by Hafez in 118 poems, or 24% of his output. It is exemplified by the well-known ghazal which begins with this line:

شکفته شد گل حمرا و گشت بلبل مست
صلای سرخوشی ای صوفیان باده پرست

šekofte šod gol-e hamrā vo gašt bolbol mast
salā-ye sarxoši ey sūfiyān-e bāde-parast

| u – u – | u u – – | u – u – | – – |
| u – u – | u u – – | u – u – | u u – |

'A red rose has bloomed and the nightingale has become intoxicated:
it is the call to enjoyment of pleasure, o Sufis, worshippers of wine!'

In the second line above there is no word break in the middle of the line, but the words flow continuously without a pause. The last syllable of sarxoši is short, because of the following vowel. The last syllable of each line is theoretically overlong, but in the metre it counts simply as long.

==== Toil and tribulation of the world ====
Another metre of pattern 4 is 4.4.13, named after the Arabic munsariḥ ( x – u – | – x – u | – u u – ) but not closely resembling it. This was used in this short poem by Naser Khosrow to complete his Safarnāme, the account of his seven-year journey to Mecca, in 1052:

رنج و عنای جهان اگرچه درازست
با بد و با نیک بی گمان به سرآید
چرخ مسافر ز بهر ماست شب و روز
هرچه یکی رفت بر اثر دگر آید
ما سفر برگذشتنی گذرانیم
تا سفر ناگذشتنی به درآید

ranj o 'anā-yē jahān 'agar-če darāz ast
bā bad o bā nīk bī gomān be sar āyad
čarx mosāfer ze bahr-e mā-st šab ō rūz
har če yek-ī raft bar 'asar degar āyad
mā safar-ē bar-gozaštanī gozarānīm
tā safar-ē nā-gozaštanī be dar āyad

– | u u – – | u – u – | u u – – |

'Although the tribulation and toil of the world is long,
with bad and with good without doubt it comes to an end.
The sky is travelling for us night and day;
each time one person goes, in his footsteps comes another.
We are passing through the journey that must be passed,
until the journey which will never end begins.'

The monosyllabic start of each half-line and the other word divisions in this poem suggest foot-divisions as marked above.

Ghazal 232 of Hafez uses the same rhyme and metre. It begins:

بر سر آنم که گر ز دست برآید
دست به کاری زنم که غصه سر آید

bar sar-e 'ān-am ke gar ze dast bar-āyad
dast be kār-ī zanam ke qosse sar-āyad

'I am in search of that which if it comes to my hand
I shall put my hand to a work from which my sorrow may end'

==== Nezāmī's Seven Portraits ====
The metre 4.5.11, known as khafīf, is used for masnavi writing (long poems in rhyming couplets). One such masnavi is the 12th-century Nezami's Haft Paykar (Seven Portraits or Seven Beauties), which begins as is customary with an address to God:

ای جهان دیده بود خویش از تو
هیچ بودی نبوده پیش از تو

'ey jahān dīde būd xīš az tō
hīč būdī na-būde pīš az tō

| x u – – | u – u – | u u – |

'O You from whom the world gained its existence;
nothing that exists existed earlier than You.'

As with other metres ending with (u u –), this is easily changed to (– –), as in the above couplet.

==== Enemy and friend ====
From a ghazal of Mowlana (Rumi) comes the following saying in the same metre:

تا بدانستیی ز دشمن و دوست
زندگانی دو بار بایستی

tā bedānestiyī ze došman o dūst
zendegānī do bār bāyestī

| x u – – | u – u – | u u – |

'So that you might distinguish between enemy and friend
it would be necessary to live twice over'

The couplet is also quoted in the form:

تا بدانستمی ز دشمن دوست
زندگانی دو بار بایستی

tā bedānestamī ze došman dūst
zendegānī do bār bāyestī

'so that I might know friend from foe
it would be necessary to live twice over.'

==== "Every moment a breath" ====
Another poet who often used 4.5.11 was Saadi, and in fact this is the most commonly used metre in his Golestān, occurring in 159 of the short poems contained in that work, more than twice as many as any other metre. The introduction to the Golestān includes a short 12-couplet masnavi of philosophical reflection, which begins as follows:

هر دم از عمر می رود نفسی
چون نگه می‌کنم نمانده بسی
ای که پنجاه رفت و در خوابی
مگر این پنج روز دریابی

har dam az ʾomr mī-ravad nafas-ī
čūn negah mī-konam, na-mānde bas-ī
'ey ke panjāh raft-o dar xāb-ī
magar īn panj rūz dar-yābī

| x u – – | u – u – | u u – |

'Every moment a breath goes from my life;
when I look, not enough has remained.
O you, who have passed fifty years yet still slumber,
perhaps you may grasp these last five days.'

It includes the famous advice:

برگ عیشی به گور خویش فرست
کس نیارد ز پس ز پیش فرست

barg-e 'eyš-ī be gūr-e xīš ferest
kas nay-ārad ze pas, ze pīš ferest

'Send sustenance for the afterlife to your own grave;
no one will bring it later, send it in advance.'

==== This rose-garden ====
In the same metre 4.5.11 is this well-known poem also from the introduction to the Golestān:

به چه کار آیدت ز گل طبقی
از گلستان من ببر ورقی
گل همین پنج روز و شش باشد
وین گلستان همیشه خوش باشد

be če kār āyad-at ze gol tabaq-ī?
az golestān-e man bebar varaq-ī
gol hamīn panj rūz-o šeš bāšad (or: rūz panj)
v-īn golestān hamīše xoš bāšad

| x u – – | u – u – | u u – |

'What use to you is a bowl of flowers?
Carry away a leaf from my Golestan (flower garden)!
A flower lasts only for these five or six days,
But this flower-garden is delightful for ever.'

==== A caravan of robes ====
An example of 4.7.14 is a qasida, by the 10th/11th-century poet Farrokhi of Sistan, which begins as follows:

با کاروان حُلّه برفتم ز سیستان
با حُلّهٔ تنیده ز دل، بافته ز جان

bā kārvān-e holle beraftam ze Sīstān
bā holle-ī tanīde ze del, bāftē ze jān

| – – | u – u – | u u – – | u – u – |

'With a caravan of robes I departed from Sistan,
with a robe spun from the heart, woven from the soul'

In the second line, the perfect suffix -e is short in tanīde 'spun', but lengthened in bāftē 'woven'.

The foot divisions above are given according to Farzaad.

==== Sufi, come! ====
The same metre, 4.7.14, known as mozāre', is used in 75 (14%) of Hafez's poems. A well-known example is the following, playing on the words sūfī "Sufi" and sāfī 'clear':

صوفی بیا که آینه صافی‌ست جام را
تا بنگری صفای می لعل‌فام را

sūfī biyā, ke āyene sāfī-st jām-rā
tā bengarī safā-ye mey-ē la'l-fām-rā

| – – | u – u – | u u – – | u – u – |

'O Sufi, come! Since the cup's mirror is clear;
so that you may see the clarity of the ruby-coloured wine.'

==== That black-eyed gazelle ====
The metre 4.7.7(2) consists of the first seven syllables of 4.7.15 repeated. The seventh syllable, which is short in the pattern, becomes long because of the pause between the two halves of the line. In this poem, Hafez laments the unfaithfulness of his beloved:

آن آهوی سیه‌چشم * از دام ما برون شد
یاران چه چاره سازم * با این دل رمیده

ān āhu-yē siyah-čašm * az dām-e mā borūn šod
yārān, če čāre sāzam * bā īn del-ē ramīde?

| – – u – u – – || – – u – u – – |

'That black-eyed gazelle has escaped from my snare!
Friends! What remedy can I find for my troubled heart?'

=== Pattern 5 ===
==== Nezami's Leyli and Majnun ====
Except for the rubā'ī metre (see below), pattern 5 is much less commonly found than patterns 3 and 4. The most common is 5.1.10. This is used for masnavi writing, such as Nezami's story of Leyli and Majnun (completed 1192), which begins as follows, with a play on the words nām 'name' and nāme 'account or story':

ای نام تو بهترین سرآغاز
بی نام تو نامه کی کنم باز

'ey nām-e to behtarīn sarāqāz
bī-nām-e to nāme key konam bāz?

– – u u – u – u – –

'O you whose name is the best beginning;
without your name when shall I begin a story?'

Unlike the other masnavi metres, which all have eleven syllables, this one has only ten.

The divisions into feet are unclear. Farzaad proposed the following, using a 5-syllable foot:

– – | u u – u – | u – –

==== A shirt of leaves ====
A shorter example of a masnavi in 5.1.10, consisting of just three couplets, is found in Saadi's Golestân. It begins:

پیراهن برگ بر درختان
چون جامهٔ عید نیکبختان

pīrāhan-e barg bar deraxtān
čun jāme-ye 'īd-e nīk-baxtān

– – u u – u – u – –

'A shirt of leaves on the trees;
like the festival clothes of fortunate people.'

==== Make haste ====
This metre 5.1.10 is also used, although less often, in lyric poetry. In one of his ghazals, Saadi uses it in a stanzaic form with four lines to a verse. The rhyme scheme is AABA, CCCA, DDDA, and so on. The twelfth verse goes as follows:

باد است غرور زندگانی
برق است لوامع جوانی
دریاب دمی که می‌توانی
بشتاب که عمر در شتاب است

bād ast qorūr-e zendegānī
barq ast lavāme'-ē javānī
daryāb dam-ī ke mītavānī
beštāb ke 'omr dar šetāb ast

– – | u u – u – u – –

'The vainglory of life is wind;
the brilliances of youth are lightning;
find a moment when you are able;
make haste, since life is in haste.'

The internal rhymes -dast/-qast, -yāb/-tāb confirm Farzaad's claim that a foot division should be made after the first two syllables.

==== If looking is forbidden ====
Another metre using the fifth pattern is 5.3.08(2). In contrast with other metres that start with a double short, in this metre the initial pair of short syllables (u u) is never replaced by long-short (– u). The metre can be analysed as 5.1.10 without the first two syllables, doubled. There is a break in the middle of each hemistich, but an overlong syllable may overlap the break, as in the first hemistich below, from a ghazal of Saadi:

من اگر نظر حرام است * بسی گناه دارم
چه کنم نمی‌توانم * که نظر نگاه دارم

man agar nazar harām ast * bas-ī gonāh dāram
če konam? nemītavānam * ke nazar negāh dāram

| u u – u – u – – || u u – u – u – – |

'If looking is forbidden, I have sinned a lot.
What am I to do? I can't stop looking.'

It has been suggested that this metre is derived from 3.1.08(2) by the reversal (syncopation or anaclasis) of syllables 4 and 5:

| u u – – | u u – – || u u – – | u u – – | (3.1.08(2))

In Ancient Greek poetry the rhythm (u u – u – u – –) is known as an anacreontic, which is named after Anacreon, a poet of Asia Minor (6th–5th century BC). In exactly the same way, metricians have suggested that the anacreontic may be derived by anaclasis from an ionic dimeter (u u – – u u – –).

==== Tonight you are ours! ====
The same doubled metre 5.3.08(2) is used in a poem by Saadi's contemporary, Rumi:

بکشید یار گوشم * که تو امشب آنِ مایی
صنما بلی ولیکن * تو نشان بده کجایی

bekešīd yār gūš-am * ke to emšab ān-e mā-ī
sanamā! balī va-līkan * to nešān bedeh kojā-ī

| u u – u – u – – || u u – u – u – – |

'My beloved pulled my ear, saying "Tonight you are ours"!
My idol! Willingly! But you must give some indication of where you are!'

For a recording of this poem in Persian see External links.

=== Ruba'i ===
The ruba'i (or robā'ī) is unusual in that two metres, 5.1.13 and 3.3.13, are used and are often mixed together in the same poem. It is also unusual in that this combined metre is only used for robā'īyāt and not for other types of poem. In fact the two metres are the same except that the 6th and 7th syllables are reversed. The rhythm is therefore the following:

– | – u u – || u – u – | – u u – | or
– | – u u – || – u u – | – u u – |

The foot divisions are those suggested by Farzaad. At the point marked ||, which Farzaad calls the "hinge" of the line, in some kinds of traditional recitation there is often a pause.

The metre 5.1.13 is more common than 3.3.13; in an extensive survey of quatrains by Khayyam and Hafez, Farzaad found 70% of lines were in 5.1.13. 21% of 100 quatrains examined by Elwell-Sutton were entirely in 5.1.13, but only 8% entirely in 3.3.13. The rest were mixed.

The ending u u – is changed to – – in nearly half of all verses. Substitution of – for u u in syllables 3 and 4 is much less common; it occurs in only 5% of lines according to Farzaad. (In theory the substitution of – for u u may also occur in syllables 7 and 8, but this is exceedingly rare.) The most common variant of all, accounting for some 38% of lines, is:

– | – u u – || u – u – | – u u – |

==== You are drunk! ====
An example of 3.3.13 mixed with 5.1.13 is the following. It is attributed to Omar Khayyam:

شیخی به زنی فاحشه گفتا مستی
هر لحظه به دام دگری پابستی
گفتا شیخا، هر آن‌چه گویی هستم
آیا تو چنان‌که می‌نمایی هستی؟

šeyx-ī be zan-ī fāheše goftā mastī
har lahze be dām-ē degarī pā bastī
goftā, šeyxā, har ānče gū'ī hastam
āyā to čenān ke mīnamā'ī hastī?

– | – u u – | – u u – | – u u – | (3.3.13)
– | – u u – | – u u – | – u u – | (3.3.13)
– | – u u – | u – u – | – u u – | (5.1.13)
– | – u u – | u – u – | – u u – | (5.1.13)

'A religious leader said to a prostitute 'You are drunk!
Every moment you trap your foot in another man's snare.'
She said, 'Sir, I am everything that you say.
But are you such a person as you pretend to be?''

==== O friend, come! ====
Another example is the following, also attributed to Khayyam:

ای دوست بیا تا غم فردا نخوریم
وین یک دمِ عمر را غنیمت شمریم
فردا که از این دیرِ فنا درگذریم
با هفت‌هزارسالگان سربه‌سریم

'ey dūst biyā tā qam-e fardā na-xorīm
v-īn yek-dam-e ʾomr-rā qanīmat šomarīm
fardā ke az īn deyr-e fanā dar-gozarīm
bā haft-hezār-sālegān sar-be-sar-īm

– | – u u – | – u u – | – u u – | (3.3.13)
– | – u u – | u – u – | – u u – | (5.1.13)
– | – u u – | – u u – | – u u – | (3.3.13)
– | – u u – | u – u – | – u u – | (5.1.13)

'O friend, come, let us not eat the sorrow of tomorrow,
but count this one moment of life as a blessing.
Tomorrow when we pass from this mortal world,
we shall be equal with seven-thousand-year-old men.'

==== The wine-seller ====
In the following example, the biceps elements at the beginning and end of the line are replaced almost everywhere by a single long syllable:

پیری دیدم به خانهٔ خمّاری
گفتم نکنی ز رفتگان اِخباری
گفتا می خور که همچو ما بسیاری
رفتند و خبر بازنیامد باری

pīr-ī dīdam be xāne-yē xammār-ī
goftam, nakonī ze raftegān exbār-ī?
goftā, mey xor, ke hamčo mā besyār-ī
raftand o xabar bāz nayāmad bār-ī

– | – u u – | u – u – | – u u – | (5.1.13)
– | – u u – | u – u – | – u u – | (5.1.13)
– | – u u – | u – u – | – u u – | (5.1.13)
– | – u u – | – u u – | – u u – | (3.3.13)

'I saw an old man in the house of a wine-seller.
I said, 'Will you not tell me news of those who have gone?'
He said, "Drink some wine, for many a one like us
Has gone, and no news has ever come again".'

=== Other metres ===
==== Kāmil ====
Although the patterns listed above cover virtually all the poems of the classical period, sometimes other metres are found, used experimentally. The following poem, for example, by the 18th-century poet Hatef Esfahani, is written in the kāmil metre, rare in Persian but common in Arabic. It begins as follows:

چه شود به چهرهٔ زرد من * نظری برای خدا کنی
که اگر کنی همه درد من * به یکی نظاره دوا کنی

če šavad be čehre-ye zard-e man * nazar-ī barā-ye Xodā konī
ke 'agar konī hame dard-e man * be yekī nazāre davā konī

| uu – u – | uu – u – || uu – u – | uu – u – |

'If only you could look at my sallow face for the sake of God,
since if you did, you would heal all my pain with that single glance!'

It is traditionally sung to a melody (gūše) called Čahārbāq, named after the well-known avenue Chaharbagh in Isfahan.

== Bibliography ==
- Bashiri, Iraj (1979). "Hafiz' Shirazi Turk: A Structuralist's Point of View", The Muslim World, LXIX, 979, pp. 178–97, 248–68. (alternative link)
- Blochmann, Henry (1872). The Prosody of the Persians according to Saifi, Jami, and other Writers. Calcutta.
- Browne, E. G. (1908–). A Literary History of Persia. Cambridge. (4 volumes)
- De Blois, François (1994). Persian Literature: A Bio-Bibliographical Survey, vol 5. Royal Asiatic Society.
- Deo, Ashwini; Kiparsky, Paul (2011). "Poetries in Contact: Arabic, Persian, and Urdu". In Maria-Kristina Lotman and Mihhail Lotman ed. Proceedings of International Conference on Frontiers in Comparative Metrics, Estonia, pp. 147–173.
- Elwell-Sutton, L.P. (1975). "The Foundations of Persian Prosody and Metrics". Iran, vol 13. (Available on JSTOR.)
- Elwell-Sutton, L.P. (1976). The Persian Metres. Cambridge University Press.
- Elwell-Sutton, L.P. (1986). "ʾAruz". Encyclopaedia Iranica.
- Farzaad, Masuud (1942). The Metre of the Robaaii. Tehran
- Farzaad, M. (1967). Persian poetic meters: a synthetic study. Leiden: Brill
- Hayes, Bruce (1979). "The rhythmic structure of Persian verse." Edebiyat 4, 193–242.
- Heny, Jeannine Marie (1981). Rhythmic Elements in Persian Poetry. University of Pennsylvania, Ph.D. Dissertation.
- Hosseini, Seyed Ayat (2014) "The Phonology and Phonetics of Prosodic Prominence in Persian" Ph.D. Dissertation.
- Mahdavi Mazdeh, Mohsen (2017). "The quantitative nature of meters in Persian folk songs and pop song lyrics". Paper presented at the First North American Conference on Iranian Linguistics (NACIL1). Stony Brook, NY.
- Perry, J. R. (1978). Review of L. P. Elwell-Sutton The Persian Metres, Journal of Arabic Literature, Volume 9, Issue 1.
- Thiesen, Finn (1982). A Manual of Classical Persian Prosody, with chapters on Urdu, Karakhanidic and Ottoman prosody. Wiesbaden.
