= Brevis in longo =

Feature of Latin and Greek poetic metre

In Greek and Latin metre, brevis in longo (/ˈbrɛvɪs ɪn ˈlɒŋɡoʊ/; Classical Latin: [ˈbrɛwɪs ɪn ˈlɔŋɡoː]) is a short syllable at the end of a line that is counted as long. The term is short for (syllaba) brevis in (elemento) longo, meaning "a short [syllable] in a long [element]". Although the phenomenon itself has been known since ancient times, the phrase is said to have been invented by the classical scholar Paul Maas.

Brevis in longo is possible in various classical metres that require a long syllable at the end of a line, including dactylic hexameters and iambic trimeters. It can also be found in the centre of a line in some metres, before a dieresis (e.g. in the iambic octonarius). However, it does not seem to be found in every metre. For example, in Greek, in ionic metres ending in u u – –, there do not seem to be any examples.

A similar phenomenon is found in other languages whose poetic metres are quantitative, such as Arabic, Persian, and Sanskrit.

Brevis in longo is associated with catalexis (the shortening of a metre by one syllable), in that when a metre ending u – loses its final syllable, the former short penultimate element becomes long since it is now final.

Brevis in longo is distinct from the metrical element anceps, which is a position in a line which can be filled by either a long or a short syllable. These two phenomena are often confused but there are differences between the two. For example, an anceps will be considered short or long in accordance with its natural length. A brevis in longo, on the other hand, will always be considered long, even though its natural quantity is short: the pause at the end of the line adds weight enough for even a short syllable to be counted as long.

== In Ancient Greek ==
Brevis in longo elements are quite common in Homer, occurring every four or five verses. An example is line 2 of the Iliad:

οὐλομένην, ἣ μυρί’ Ἀχαιοῖς ἄλγε’ ἔθηκε
ouloménēn, hḕ murí’ Akhaioîs álge’ éthēke
| – u u | – – | – u u | – – | – u u | – – |
"that baleful (anger), which made many sorrows for the Achaeans"

The phenomenon can also occur at the end of iambic lines, for example, the opening of Euripides' play the Bacchae:

ἥκω Διὸς παῖς τήνδε Θηβαίων χθόνα
hḗkō Diòs paîs tḗnde Thēbaíōn khthóna
| – – u – | – – u – | – – u – |
"I, son of Zeus, have come to this land of the Thebans"

The brevis in longo can thus be found both in a weak position, i.e. in a pendant (feminine) ending, and in a strong one, i.e. in a blunt ending. There has been some discussion among scholars over whether these two types should be classified separately.

Ancient writers on Latin and Greek metre noted that it was logical for a short syllable at the end of a line to be taken as long, since the pause helped to make up the length. Brevis in longo therefore only exists when there is a pause. When a line with a rhythm such as | – u u – u u – u u – u u | is part of a continuous song, there is no pause at the end of the line and the final syllable remains short.

Another question discussed by scholars is whether a word ending in a short vowel + one consonant, such as πολλάκις (pollákis) "often", at the end of a line should be considered as ending in a short or long syllable. In the view of Martin West "only a syllable ending in a short open vowel should be counted as short", on the grounds that in some poets the treatment of these is different from that of words ending in a short vowel + one consonant. For example, Pindar has a marked tendency to avoid placing a word ending in a short vowel before a pause, while not so avoiding words ending in a consonant.

Another study, by the American scholars Devine and Stephens, similarly shows that a word ending in a short vowel (-V̆) such as χθόνα (khthóna) "land" at the end of an iambic trimeter or dactylic pentameter is less common than one ending in a short vowel + consonant (-V̌C), and that the latter in turn is less common than one ending in a long vowel with or without a consonant (-V̄(C)); in Callimachus' pentameters, for example, the proportions are 12.71% for -V̆, 27.62% for -V̌C and 59.67% for -V̄(C). The Roman poet Ovid also avoided a short vowel at the end of a dactylic pentameter, which suggests that an ending of vowel + consonant was felt to be heavier than short vowel alone.

When a metre with a short penultimate element is made catalectic (i.e. abbreviated by one syllable), the short element is affected by the brevis in longo phenomenon, and becomes long. An example in Ancient Greek is the iambic tetrameter, which in normal and catalectic form is as follows:

| x – u – | x – u – | x – u – | x – u – |
| x – u – | x – u – | x – u – | u – – |

The deletion of the final element causes the previously short penultimate to become long, and at the same time the anceps at the beginning of the final metron becomes definitely short.

== In Latin ==
Brevis in longo is less common in Virgil than in Homer, but is still found:

obruit Auster, aqu(ā) involvēns nāvemque virōsque
| – u u | – u u | – – | – – | – u u | – – |
"the South Wind overwhelmed them, wrapping up both ship and men with water"

It can also be found in iambics, as in following lines from Catullus which show a series of short-vowel brevis in longo endings in an iambic setting:

tib(i) haec fuisse et esse cognitissima
ait phasēlus: ultim(ā) ex orīgine
tuō stetisse dīcit in cacūmine,
tu(ō) imbuisse palmulās in aequore
| u – u – | u – u – | u – u – |
"to you these things were and are very well known,
says the boat; originally,
it says, it was your mountain top on which it stood
and your sea in which it dipped its oars."

Catullus, Propertius and Tibullus also occasionally allow a short-vowel brevis in longo at the end of a pentameter:

iūcundum, mea vīta, mihī prōpōnis amōrem

hunc nostr(um) inter nōs perpetuumque fore.

| – – | – u u | – u u | – – | – u u | – – |

| – – | – – | – || – u u | – u u | –

"My darling, you declare to me that this love between us
will be delightful and everlasting"

However, in Ovid, although words like erit ending with short vowel + consonant are very common at the end of a pentameter, words like fore which end with a short vowel are extremely rare.

Brevis in longo is also found in the rhythmic sentence-endings favoured by orators known as clausulae. In a discussion of these, Cicero says: "It makes no difference whether the final word is a cretic (– u –) or a dactyl (– u u), since even in poetry it doesn't matter whether a final syllable is long or short."

However, according to the teacher of rhetoric Quintilian, a spondaic ending such as confitērī "to confess" sounded stronger than a trochaic one such as timēre "to fear": "I am well aware that a short syllable can stand for a long one in final position, because some of the silence which follows seems to be added to it; but when I consult my ears it seems to make a big difference whether the last syllable is truly long, or merely a short standing for a long."

== In Arabic ==
In classical Arabic, when a verse ends in an open vowel, the vowel is always lengthened in performance. If the vowel is -a, it is always written with alif, like any long -a; if it is -i or -u it is usually omitted in writing, but still pronounced long. Thus a normally short vowel can stand in final position in metres such as the ṭawīl, where the repeating pattern of the feet leads one to expect a long syllable at the end:

| u – x | u – x – | u – x | u – u – |

Exactly as with Greek, a short penultimate becomes long when a line is made catalectic. Thus the most commonly used Arabic metre, the ṭawīl, has normal and catalectic forms as follows:

| u – x | u – x – | u – x | u – u – |
| u – x | u – x – | u – u | u – – |

== In Persian ==
In classical Persian, just as in Latin and Greek, poetic metres are quantitative, except that in addition to long and short syllables, Persian also has "overlong" syllables which are equivalent in length to long + short.

The final syllable of any Persian line or hemistich is considered to be long. In this position, the difference between short, long, and overlong syllables is neutralised, and any of the three may be placed here. It is sometimes said that a final short vowel is lengthened in final position (which is possible), but Thiesen argues that in some cases at least a short vowel is retained, since in Hafez a final -e is almost never lengthened in normal positions, but is readily used at the end of a verse. The pronunciation of such endings by Persian speakers is also short.

The lengthening of a penultimate short syllable when a line is made catalectic is found in Persian too; for example, if a metre in choriambic (– u u –) rhythm is shortened, the resulting ending is a cretic (– u –). The following are two different metres, one a shortened version of the other:

| – u u – | – u u – | – u u – | – u u – |
| – u u – | – u u – | – u – |

== In Sanskrit ==
The final syllable of a line in Sanskrit poetry, in any metre, like those of Latin and Greek, is indifferent in quantity, that is, it may be long or short. Examples can be found in epic poetry, in which in each four-line stanza, or śloka, the first and third lines usually have a trochaic ending, and the second and fourth line always an iambic one. Thus in the following stanza (the opening of the Bhagavad Gītā), the last syllable, though short, stands for a long one:

dharma-kṣetre kuru-kṣetre
samavetā yuyutsavaḥ
māmakāḥ pāṇḍavāś caiva
kim akurvata sañjaya

| – – – – | u – – – |
| u u – – | u – u – ||
| – u – – | u – – u |
| u u – u | u – u u ||

"In the place of righteousness at Kurukṣetra,
gathered together and desiring battle,
my sons and the sons of Pandu,
what did they do, Sanjaya?"

== See also ==
- Prosody (Latin)
- Prosody (Greek)
- Arabic prosody
- Persian metres
- Catalectic
- Anceps
