= Madīd (metre) =

Classical Arabic Poetic Metre

The Madīd (مَدِيد, "protracted") metre is one of the metres used in classical Arabic poetry. The theoretical pattern of the metre is as follows, where u = a short syllable, – a long syllable, and x = anceps (either long or short):

فَاعِلَاتُنْ فَاعِلُنْ فَاعِلَاتُنْ فَاعِلُنْ
Fāʿilātun Fāʿilun Fāʿilātun Fāʿilun
| x u – x | x u – | x u – – | x u – |

However, more usually the metre is found in a trimeter version. The full version of the trimeter is as follows:

فَاعِلَاتُنْ فَاعِلُنْ فَاعِلَاتُنْ
Fāʿilātun Fāʿilun Fāʿilātun
| x u – x | x u – | x u – – |

In two of the examples below, the metre is used in a catalectic trimeter version (i.e. shortened by one syllable), as follows:

فَاعِلَاتُنْ فَاعِلُنْ فَاعِلُنْ
Fāʿilātun Fāʿilun Fāʿilun
| x u – x | x u – | x u – |

In the above catalectic trimeter version, the 2nd and 3rd anceps syllables (x) are usually long (never both short), and the 3rd is almost always short. The final foot | u u – | may become | – – |.

The Madīd metre is only rarely used. Only 0.43% of Vadet's corpus of 1st–3rd century AD poetry are in this metre. It does not occur at all in Stoetzer's corpus of 8th-century poems or in the 10th-century poet al-Mutanabbi. The tetrameter version is rarely found in practice except in prosodists' examples.

== Examples ==
=== Tetrameter ===
The longer tetrameter version of this metre is rare. The following line, a mother's lament for her son, is found in the Ḥamāsa, an anthology of poems compiled in the 9th century by Abū Tammām:

ليت قلبي ساعةً صبرهُ عنكَ مَلَك * ليت نفسي قُدِّمت للمنايا بدلك

layta qalb-ī sāʿatan * ṣabra-hū ʿanka malak
layta nafs-ī quddimat * li-l-manāyā badalak

| – u – – | – u – || – u – – | u u – |

"Would that my heart for an hour * could control its grief for you;
Would that my soul could be sacrificed * to Fate instead of you."

In this version, there is a clear break between the two halves of the hemistich.

=== Trimeter ===
The trimeter is more common than the tetrameter. The following line is by the 8th-century Iraqi poet Abu-l-ʿAtahiya:

إنّما أنتَ بوادي ٱلمنايا * إن رماكَ ٱلموت فيه أصابا

ʼinnamā ʼanta bi-wādi l-manāyā
ʼin ramāka l-mawtu fīhi ʼaṣābā

| – u – – | u u – | – u – – |
| – u – – | – u – | u u – – |

"Lo, you are dwelling in Fate's vale;
when Death strikes you, it will not fail."

=== Trimeter catalectic ===
More often the trimeter is used in a catalectic version, that is, with the final syllable missing. A well known poem in this catalectic version is the following by the Baghdadi Sufi poet Sumnūn al-Muḥibb (also known as Samnūn, died c. 910 AD):

كان لى قلب أعيش به * ضــــــاع منى فى تقلبه
رب فاردده عليّ فقد * ضاق صدري في تطلبه
وأغث ما دام بي رمقٌ * يا غياثَ المستغيثِ به

kāna lī qalbun ’aʿīšu bihī
ḍāʿa minnī fī taqallubihī
rabbi fardudhu ʿalayya fa-qad
ḍāqa ṣadrī fī taṭallubihī
wa-ʼaḡiṯ mā dāma bī ramaqun
yā ḡiyāṯa l-mustaḡīṯi bihī

– u – – | – u – | u u –
– u – – | – u – | u u –
– u – – | u u – | u u –
– u – – | – u – | u u –
– u – – | – u – | u u –
– u – – | – u – | u u –

"I had a heart which I lived with;
I lost it in its turning.
Lord, return it to me, since
my breast has become narrow in searching for it.
And succour me as long as life remains,
O succour of him who seeks assistance."

Another version of the metre is used by the Arabian poet Baha' al-din Zuhair (1186–1258) in the love ode which begins:

کل شیء منک مقبول * وعلی العینین محمول
والاذی یرضیک من تلفی * هین عندی ومبذول

kullu šayʼin minka maqbūlū
wa ʿala l-ʿaynayni maḥmūlū
wa-l-laḏī yurḍīka min talafī
hayyinun ʿindī wa mabḏūlū

– u – – | – u – | – –
u u – – | – u – | – –
– u – – | – u – | u u –
– u – – | – u – | – –

"Everything from you is acceptable
and bearable in my eyes;
And what pleases you of my destruction
is easy for me and (readily) bestowed."

In this version of the metre, the final u u – is optionally changed to – –. This variation, affecting the last three syllables of the line, is also found in the Basīṭ metre, and is also common in Persian poetry.

=== Medieval Hebrew poetry ===
This metre is almost never used in medieval Hebrew poetry. However, Halper quotes a piyyut written by the 12th-century Spanish scholar Abraham ibn Ezra in the trimeter version of the metre, which runs as follows:

אֶשְׂמְחָה כִּי אֶפְתְּחָה פִּי לְהוֹדוֹת
אֶעֱנֶה טוּב מַעֲנֶה שִׁיר יְדִידוֹת

’esmĕchah ki ’eftĕchah pi lĕhodot
’e‘ĕneh tuv ma‘ăneh shir yĕdidot

| – u – – | – u – | – u – – |

Because of the rarity of short syllables in Hebrew, Ibn Izra chooses the long alternative of each anceps.

== See also ==
- Metre (poetry)#The Arabic metres
- Arabic prosody
