= Do-baytī =

Ancient form of Persian poetry

Do-bayti (Persian: دوبیتی; lit. 'two-couplet'), also known as fahlaviyat, is an ancient form of Persian poetry. It is used to describe a Persian quatrain (a stanza or poem of four lines), similar to Ruba'i but different in meter.

A do-bayti has four half-lines of 11 syllables each, and usually uses the hazaj meter:

| u – – – | u – – – | u – – |

The first two syllables may sometimes be replaced by – u or – –.

The rhyme scheme is a a a a or a a b a.

When sung to a traditional melody, the first two lines are sung continuously in one 22-syllable phrase, and the 3rd and 4th lines in another, a little lower in pitch. (See External links below.)

== An example from Baba Taher ==
A well-known writer of do-bayti poems is the 11th-century Baba Taher-e Oryan of Hamadan, who wrote in the Hamadani dialect (which, however, is very close to standard Persian). An example of one of his poems (converted to standard Persian) is the following:

درازی دو زلفانت مرا کشت * سیاهی دو چشمانت مرا کشت
خم ابرو و مژگانت مرا کشت * به قتلم حاجت تیر و کمان نیست

siyāhī-yē do čašmān-at ma-rā košt
derāzī-yē do zolfān-at ma-rā košt
be qatl-am hājat-ē tīr ō kamān nīst
xam-ē 'abrū vo možgān-at ma-rā košt

"The blackness of your two eyes has killed me!
The longness of your two locks has killed me!
You have no need of arrows and a bow to despatch me
The curve of your eyebrow and eyelashes has killed me!"

For another example, see the article Persian metres#Do-bayti.
