= Kamil (metre) =

Kāmil (Arabic: كَامِل "perfect") is the second commonest metre (after the ṭawīl) used in pre-Islamic and classical Arabic poetry. The usual form of the metre is as follows (where "–" represents a long syllable, "u" a short syllable, and "uu" one long or two shorts):

| uu – u – | uu – u – | uu – u – |

The mnemonic words (tafāʿīl) used by Arab prosodists to describe this metre are: Mutafāʿilun Mutafāʿilun Mutafāʿilun (مُتَفَاعِلُنْ مُتَفاعِلُنْ مُتَفَاعِلُنْ).

The kāmil resembles the wāfir metre in that it makes use of biceps elements (that is, places in the verse where two short syllables can be replaced by one long one).

== In Arabic poetry ==
The kāmil metre has been used for Arabic poetry since early times and accounts for about 18%-20% of the poems in early collections. Two of the famous seven pre-Islamic Mu‘allaqāt poems (the 4th and 6th) are written in the kāmil metre. One of these is the mu‘allaqa of Labid ibn Rabi‘a, which begins as follows:

عَفَتِ الدِّيَارُ مَحَلُّهَا فَمُقَامُهَا * بِمِنَىً تَأَبَّـدَ غَوْلُهَا فَرِجَامُهَـا
فَمَدَافِعُ الرَّيَّانِ عُرِّيَ رَسْمُهَـا * خَلَقَاً كَمَا ضَمِنَ الوُحِيَّ سِلامُهَا

‘afati d-diyāru maḥalluhā fa-muqāmuhā
bi-Minan ta’abbada Ḡawluhā fa-Rijāmuhā

fa-madāfi‘u r-Rayyāni ‘urriya rasmuhā
ḵalaqan kamā ḍamina l-wuḥiyya silāmuhā

| uu – u – | uu – u – | uu – u – |
| uu – u – | uu – u – | uu – u – |
| uu – u – | – – u – | uu – u – |
| uu – u – | uu – u – | uu – u – |

"The abodes, their halting places and dwelling places, have been worn away
in Mina; Ghawl and Rijam have become deserted;

And the water-channels of Rayyan, their traces have become bare,
worn smooth in the way that rocks retain their lettering."

Another, later, example of the metre is the qasida by the 10th-century poet al-Mutanabbi which opens as follows:

بأبي الشُّموسُ الجانِحاتُ غَوارِبَ * أللاّبِساتُ مِنَ الحَريرِ جَلابِبَا
ألمُنْهِباتُ عُقُولَنَا وقُلُوبَنَا * وجَناتِهِنّ النّاهِباتِ النّاهِبَا

bi-’abi š-šumūsu l-jāniḥātu ḡawāribā
al-lābisātu mina l-ḥarīri jalābibā
al-munhibātu ‘uqūlanā wa-qulūbanā
wa-janātihinna n-nāhibāti n-nāhibā

| uu – u – | – – u – | uu – u – |
| – – u – | uu – u – | uu – u – |
| – – u – | uu – u – | uu – u – |
| uu – u – | uu – u – | – – u – |

"By my father, those suns (i.e. women) inclining to the west
who dress in garments of silk
and cause us to lose our minds and hearts
and whose paradises steal even the thief!"

As can be seen, the most common form of the metron is | uu – u – | and the contracted form | – – u – | occurs in the above example in only one third of the cases.

== In Persian poetry ==
Although relatively common in Arabic, this metre is scarcely ever used in Persian poetry. One post-classical exception, by the 18th-century poet Hatef Esfahani, is a short 6-couplet ghazal which begins as follows:

چه شود به چهرهٔ زرد من * نظری برای خدا کنی
که اگر کنی همه درد من * به یکی نظاره دوا کنی

če šavad be čehre-ye zard-e man * nazar-ī barā-ye Xodā konī
ke agar konī hame dard-e man * be yekī nazāre davā konī

| uu – u – | uu – u – || uu – u – | uu – u – |
| uu – u – | uu – u – || uu – u – | uu – u – |

"If only you could look at my sallow face for the sake of God,
since if you did, you would heal all my pain with that single glance!"

This Persian version is a tetrameter, divided into two dimeters, and every metron is of the form | uu – u – |. (Poems are also commonly found in Persian with the metron | – – u – | (see Persian metres) but the two are not mixed in the same poem.) Hatef's poem is traditionally sung to a melody (gusheh) called Chahārbāgh, named after the well-known avenue Chaharbagh in Isfahan.

== In Turkish and Urdu ==
The kāmil metre is also not found in Ottoman Turkish or (with rare exceptions) in Urdu.

== See also ==
- Arabic prosody
