= Wafir =

Arabic poetry meter

Wāfir (Arabic: وَافِر, literally 'numerous, abundant, ample, exuberant') is a meter used in classical Arabic poetry. It is among the five most popular meters of classical Arabic poetry, accounting (alongside ṭawīl, basīṭ, kāmil, and mutaqārib) for 80-90% of lines and poems in the ancient and classical Arabic corpus.

== Form ==
The meter comprises paired hemistichs of the following form (where "–" represents a long syllable, "u" a short syllable, and "uu" one long or two shorts):

| u – uu – | u – uu – | u – – |

Thus, unlike most classical Arabic meters, wāfir allows the poet to substitute one long syllable for two shorts, an example of the prosodic element known as a biceps. Thus allows wāfir lines to have different numbers of syllables from each other, a characteristic otherwise only found in kāmil, mutadārik and some forms of basīṭ.

Wāfir is traditionally represented with the mnemonic (tafāʿīl) Mufāʿalatun Mufāʿalatun Faʿūlun (مُفَاعَلَتُنْ مُفاعَلَتُنْ فَعولُنْ).

== History ==
Historically, wāfir perhaps arose, along with ṭawīl and mutaqārib, from hazaj. In the analysis of Salma K. Jayyusi, the Umayyad poet Jarir ibn Atiyah used the meter for about a fifth of his work, and at that time "this metre was still fresh and did not carry echoes of great pre-Islamic poets as did ṭawīl and baṣīt. Wāfir had therefore a great potential for introducing a diction nearer to the spoken language of the Umayyad period."

The meter, like other Arabic meters, was later borrowed into other poetic traditions. For example, it was adopted in Hebrew, where it is known as hamerubeh and became one of the pre-eminent meters of medieval poetry. In the Arabic and Arabic-influenced vernacular poetry of Sub-Saharan Africa it also features, for example in Fula and Hausa. It also underpins some oral poetic traditions in Palestine. However, it was not used in Urdu, Turkish, or Persian (or perhaps, rather, it can be said to have merged for linguistic reasons with hazaj).

== Examples ==
The following Arabic epigram by ‘Ulayya bint al-Mahdī is in wāfir meter:

كتمتُ اسم الحبيب من العباد * وردّدت الصبابة في فؤادي
فوا شوقي إلى بلدِِ خليّ * لعلّي باسْم من أهوى أنادي

katamtu sma l-ḥabībi mina l-‘ibādī / wa-raddadtu ṣ-ṣabābata fī fu’ādī
fa-wā-shawqī ’ilā baladin khaliyyin / la‘allī bi-smi man ’ahwā ’unādī

| u – – – | u – uu – | u – – || u – – – | u – uu – | u – – |
| u – – – | u – uu – | u – – || u – – – | u – – – | u – – |

I have hidden the name of my love from the crowd: / for my passion my heart is the only safe space.
How I long for an empty and desolate place / in order to call my love's name out aloud.

An example of the meter in Fula is the following poem by Ïsa ɓii Usmānu (1817-?):

Kulen Allaahu Mawɗo nyalooma jemma, / Mbaɗen ka salaatu, hooti mbaɗen salaama
He dow ɓurnaaɗo tagle he Aalo’en fuu, / Sahaabo’en he taabi’i, yimɓe himma.
Nufaare nde am mi yusɓoya gimɗi, anndee, / mi woyra ɗi Naana; ɓernde fu firgitaama
He yautuki makko, koowa he anndi juulɓe / mbaɗii hasar haqiiqa, cunninaama.

| u – – – | u – uu – | u – – || u – uu – | u – uu – | u – – |
| u – – – | u – uu – | u – – || u – – – | u – uu – | u – – |
| u – uu – | u – uu – | u – – || u – uu – | u – uu – | u – – |
| u – uu – | u – uu – | u – – || u – – – | u – – – | u – – |

Let us fear Allah the Great day and night, / let us continually invoke blessing and peace
Upon the best of creatures and all his kinsfolk, / his companions and followers, men of zeal.
Know ye, my intention is to compose verses / and with them to lament for Nāna; every heart is startled
At her passing, everyone knows that the Moslems / have suffered loss indeed, and have been saddened.
