= Hazaj meter =

Metre used in poetry of Middle East, western and southern Asia languages

Hazaj (Note: Arabic: هزج, romanized: hazaj, lit. 'to chant, to intone, to sing') meter is a quantitative verse meter frequently found in the epic poetry of the Middle East and western Asia. A musical rhythm (Note: The hazaj music meter is part of the iqa ("rhythm") system, which expresses the various meters of the literary 'aruḍ system in terms of rhythmic units. In terms of music meter, the hazaj has a 2/4 signature. Both the iqa and 'aruḍ systems are attributed to Khalil ibn Ahmad.) of the same name (Note: The Arabic word literally means "trilling" or "rhythmical speech," or – as an infinitive – "to modulate one's voice.") is based on the literary meter.

== Hazaj in Arabic poetry ==
Like the other meters of the al-ʿarūḍ system of Arabic poetry, the basic rhyme unit of hazaj meter compositions is a closed couplet—a bayt "distich" (literally "tent")—of two hemistichs known as miṣrāʿs ("tent flaps").

Characteristic of the hazaj meter (in relation to the other al-ʿarūḍ meters) is its leading iamb, that is, the first two syllables of its prosodic feet are short-long. (Note: The related wāfir meter also has a short-long sequence on the first two beats. The wāfir is, however, mora-timed.) This syllable pair (the watid, "peg") is then repeated at fixed points along the length of a line, and two variable syllables (the sabab, "guy-wire"s) are "tied" to each instance of it. The hazaj measure is thus nominally (Note: The smallest unit of the al-'aruḍ meters is not the syllable but the ḥarf, the letter, and although the meters are quantitative, and can so also be described in terms of syllable count (and length), certain letters have to be ignored or mentally interpolated when determining the scansion of a line.) tetrasyllabic. Its two common variations are:

a) a first epitrite variant:	u – – –	(short-long-long-long, mafāʿīlūn pattern)
b) an antispast variant:	u – – u	(short-long-long-short, mafāʿīlu pattern)

In Classical Arabic, the hazaj is generally used in a dimeter version of four feet. There is also a catalectic version in which the last syllable of the second miṣrāʿ is omitted. The complete bayt is as follows ("x" indicates a syllable of variable length):

u – – x | u – – x || u – – x | u – – (–)

An example is the qasida of the 10th-century poet Abu Firas al-Hamdani which begins:

سَلامٌ رائِحٌ، غادِ، * عَلى سَاكِنَة ِ الوَادِي
عَلى مَنْ حُبّهَا الهَادي، * إذَا مَا زُرْتُ، وَالحَادِي
أُحِبُّ البَدْوَ، مِنْ أجْلِ * غزالٍ ، فيهمُ بادِ
ألاَ يا ربة َ الحليِ، * على العاتقِ والهادي

salāman rā'iḥun ḡādī * ʿalā sākinati l-wādī
ʿalā man ḥubbuhā l-hādī * ’iḏā mā zurtu wa-l-ḥādī
’uḥibbu l-badwa min ’ajli * ḡazālin fīhumū bādi
’alā yā rabbata l-ḥullī * ʿalā l-ʿātiqi wa-l-hādī

"Greetings, as I come and go, to the girl who lives in the valley;
love of her is my guide, whenever I visit, and my incentive;
I love the Bedu because of a gazelle who is seen among them.
O you who wear that jewellery on your shoulder and neck!"

The hazaj can also be used in dimeter form, as in the following quatrain attributed to the 7th-century Caliph Yazid I:

انا المسموم ما عندي
بترياق ولا راقي
ادر كاساً وناولها
الا يا ايها الساقي

ʼana-l-masmūmu mā ʿindī
bi-taryāqi wa-lā rāqī
ʼadir kaʼsan wa-nāwilhā
ʼalā yā ʼayyuha-s-sāqī

| u – – x | u – – x |

I am poisoned, and I do not have
any remedy or enchanter.
Circulate a cup and pass it;
Ho there, o wine-pourer!

There is a pleasing internal rhyme (-āqi ... -āqī) in the second line of the above quatrain. The last two lines, in reverse order, were borrowed by the Persian poet Hafez in his 1st ghazal Alā yā ayyoha-s-sāqī.

The hazaj is one of the less common Arabic meters. It is only very rarely used in early Arabic poetry, and does not occur at all in Stoetzer's collection of 130 8th-century poems, and in fewer than 10 of Vadet's collection of 2300 poems and fragments of Bedouin poetry of the 1st-3rd centuries AD.

The hazaj meter may also be the base metric of contemporary Arabic band compositions, but this is uncertain.

== Resemblance to wāfir ==
The hazaj meter may be compared to the wāfir meter, which has the following rhythm, in which u u may be replaced in any foot by a single long syllable:

u – uu – | u – uu – | u – –

One difference between them is that the wāfir is quite commonly used in Arabic poetry but never used at all in Persian, Turkish or Urdu. However, in its contracted form, where both pairs of short syllables in a hemistich (half-line) are replaced by a long one, it closely resembles the Persian 11-syllable hazaj:

u – – – | u – – – | u – –

== Hazaj in Hebrew poetry ==
The first poet to imitate Arabic meters in Hebrew is said to have been Dunash ben Labrat (915-70), who was possibly born in Fez, Morocco but lived in Spain. His most famous poem, the D'ror Yikra, is written in the hazaj meter. It begins as follows:

דְּרוֹר יִקְרָא לְבֵן עִם בַּת * וְיִנְצָרְכֶם כְּמוֹ בָבַת
נְעִים שִׁמְכֶם וְלא יֻשְׁבַּת * שְׁבוּ נוּחוּ בְּיוֹם שַׁבָּת
D'ror yikra l'ven im bat * V'yintsorchem k'mo vavat.
Na'im shimchem velo yushbat * Sh'vu nuchu b'yom Shabbat.
"Freedom shall He proclaim for His sons and daughters * and will keep you as the apple of His eye .
Pleasant is Your name and will not cease to be. * Repose (and) rest on the Sabbath day."

The first letters of each half line in this stanza make up the name "DUNASH".

To make the short syllables of the meter, Dunash generally uses the sheva half vowel. Occasionally, however, he uses one of the other "short" vowels of Hebrew, as in the word na'im in the second line, which was presumably pronounced n'im.

Since the 4th syllable of each foot is always long, Dunash's meter rhythmically has much more in common with the 16-syllable Persian hazaj than with Abu Firas's Arabic version quoted above, which frequently uses a short syllable in the 4th position.

Other traditional Jewish hymns, such as Adon Olam, are written in the same meter. However, since the pronunciation of Hebrew no longer distinguishes long and short vowels, the various melodies used for such hymns these days are often in different rhythms that ignore the characteristic u – – – foot of the hazaj.

In Hebrew, the hazaj meter is known as הַמִּשְׁקָל הַמַּרְנִין, ha-mishqal ha-marnin.

== Persian hazaj ==
The hazaj meter is also represented in Ottoman Turkish, Persian and other Iranian, Urdu and other North Indian Islamic traditions.

In Persian, Ottoman Turkish and Urdu, the antispast variant given above is not used, and the meter is found mainly in two forms, one of 11 syllables and the other of 16:

u – – – | u – – – | u – – (x2)
u – – – | u – – – || u – – – | u – – – (x2)

=== 11-syllable version ===
By the 11th century, the 11-syllable version of the hazaj meter had become "the most popular meter for romantic epics" in Iranian language compositions. Particularly notable Persian poems in the hazaj meter include Fakhruddin As'ad Gurgani's Wis u Ramin, and – extending to 6,150 verses – Nizami's Khusraw u Shirin. "The preference for Hazaj-type meters may be explained in terms of their relationship to folk verses and songs. The meter of hazaj and its variations are among the ones most frequently found in folk poetry such as du-baytī and lullabies (lālā'ī). The [11-syllable] meter of hazaj-i musaddas-e maḥdūf-i maqṣūr, which is the meter of du-baytī (or čār-baytī in regional dialects), is particularly often sung in the āwāz-i daštī, which is closely associated with Iranian folk tunes."

An example of the 11-syllable hazaj in Persian is Nizami's epic poem Khusraw u Shirin mentioned above, completed in 1180, of which the first verse is as follows:

خداوندا در توفیق بگشای * نظامی را ره تحقیق بنمای
xudāwandā dar-i tawfīq bugšāy * Niẓāmī-rā rah-i tahqīq binmāy
"O God, open the door of success; show Nezami the way of investigation"

The underlined syllables are "overlong"; that is, they count as equivalent to a long syllable plus a short one, a typical feature of Persian verse, imitated in Turkish and Urdu poetry, but not found in Arabic.

The meter of the du-baytī is similar to this, except that – u or – – may sometimes be substituted for the initial u –.

=== 16-syllable version ===
The 16-syllable version of the hazaj meter was used for lyric poetry such as some of the ghazals of Hafez and their imitations in Urdu and Ottoman Turkish. About 6% of Persian lyric poems are in this metre, and 16% of Ottoman Turkish ones. This form of the metre usually has a break in the middle of each half-line, dividing the couplet into four equal parts, giving a very similar rhythmic effect to the poem of Dunash quoted above. The following example comes from one of the spiritual ghazals of the 13th-century mystic poet Rumi:

چه تدبیر ای مسلمانان که من خود را نمی‌دانم
نه ترسا و یهودیم نه گبرم نه مسلمانم

či tadbīr ay musalmānān? ki man xwad-rā namē-dānam
na tarsā wa yahūdīy-am, na gabr-am na: musalmān-am

"What am I to do, o Muslims? Since I do not know myself;
I am not a Christian or a Jew, nor a Zoroastrian, nor a Muslim."

In this particular poem, Rumi not only makes a break in the middle of the line, but also in every verse makes a word break after every foot. However, other writers make a word break in the middle of the line only.

== Turkish hazaj ==
A Turkish poem in this meter is the following from the 16th-century poet Bâkî, which begins as follows:

Ezelden şâh-ı aşkın bende-i fermânıyüz cânâ
Mahabbet mülkünün sultân-ı âli-şânıyüz cânâ

"Oh beloved, since the origin we have been the slaves of the shah of love"
"Oh beloved, we are the famed sultan of the heart's domain"

Unlike in the Rumi poem quoted above, there is no break in the middle of the half-line.

== Urdu hazaj ==
The 16-syllable hazaj meter is also among the three most commonly used meters in Urdu verse, It is one of the typical meters of the ghazal genre. The following example comes from a ghazal written by Ghalib in 1816. Like the Turkish version of the metre, it has no break in the middle of the half-line. (Asad is the earlier pen-name of Ghalib himself.)

جراحت تحفہ الماس ارمغاں داغِ جگر ہدیہ
مبارک باد اسد غم خوارِ جان درد مند آیا

jarāḥat tuḥfah almās armuġā̃ dāġh-i jigar hadiya
mubārak bād Asad ġam-xwār-i jān-i dard-mand āyā

"Wounds, a present; diamond, a gift; liver-wound, an offering –
congratulations, Asad, the comforter of an afflicted soul came by"

The underlined syllable is "overlong", taking the place of a long plus a short one, in imitation of Persian prosody.

== Ruba'i ==
The 13-syllable meter of the Persian ruba'i (quatrain) is also traditionally analysed as if it were a variety of the hazaj meter,, but in reality it is quite different, and evidently has no connection with the meter described above. The meter, which has two versions, differing in the reversal of the 6th and 7th syllables, is as follows:

– – u u – u – u – – u u –

or:

– – u u – – u u – – u u –

The analysis of this meter in terms of hazaj is made even more complicated by the fact that a long syllable can optionally be substituted for two short ones, which does not occur in the hazaj meter in Arabic poetry. It also lacks the characteristic u – – – rhythm of the hajaz.

== See also ==
- Arabic prosody
- Persian metres
- List of meters in medieval Hebrew poetry

== Bibliography ==
- Abdullah, Ibrahim (2006), "The role of the pre-modern: the generic characteristics of the 'band'", in Allen, Roger; Richards, Donald Sidney (eds.), Arabic Literature in the Post-classical Period, Cambridge University Press.
- Bailey, T. Grahame (1939), "A Guide to the Metres of Urdū Verse", Bulletin of the School of Oriental Studies, 9 (4): 969–985, doi:10.1017/S0041977X00135086.
- De Blois, François (1998), "Epics", Encyclopaedia Iranica, vol. VIII/5, New York: iranica.com.
- Deo, Ashwini; Kiparsky, Paul (2011). "Poetries in Contact: Arabic, Persian, and Urdu". In Maria-Kristina Lotman and Mihhail Lotman ed. Proceedings of International Conference on Frontiers in Comparative Metrics, Estonia, pp. 147–173.
- Finch, Roger (1984), "Notes on Arabic Prosody", Alif: Journal of Comparative Poetics, 1 (4): 42–62
- Gail, Marzieh (1951), Persia and the Victorians, London: Allen and Unwin.
- Golston, Chris & Riad, Tomas (1997). "The Phonology of classical Arabic meter". Linguistics 35 (1997), 111–132.
- İnan, Murat Umut (2012). "Writing a Grammatical Commentary on Hafiz of Shiraz: A Sixteenth-century Ottoman Scholar on the Divan of Hafiz". PhD Dissertation.
- Maling, J.M. (1973). The Theory of Classical Arabic Metrics. Massachusetts Institute of Technology. PhD Thesis.
- McCarus, Ernest N. (1983). "Identifying the Meters of Arabic Poetry", Al-'Arabiyya vol 16. no. 1/2, pp. 57–83. (Georgetown University Press).
- Rosenfeld-Hadad, Merav (2011) Mishaf al-Shbahot - The Holy Book of Praises of the Babylonian Jews: One Thousand Years of Cultural Harmony between Judaism and Islam. In M.M. Laskier and Y. Lev. The Convergence of Judaism and Islam: Religious, Scientific, and Cultural Dimensions. University Press of Florida.
- Tsuge, Gen'ichi (1989), "Āvāz", Encyclopaedia Iranica, vol. III/I, New York: Routledge & Kegan Paul.
