= Arabic prosody =

Prosody of Arabic poetry

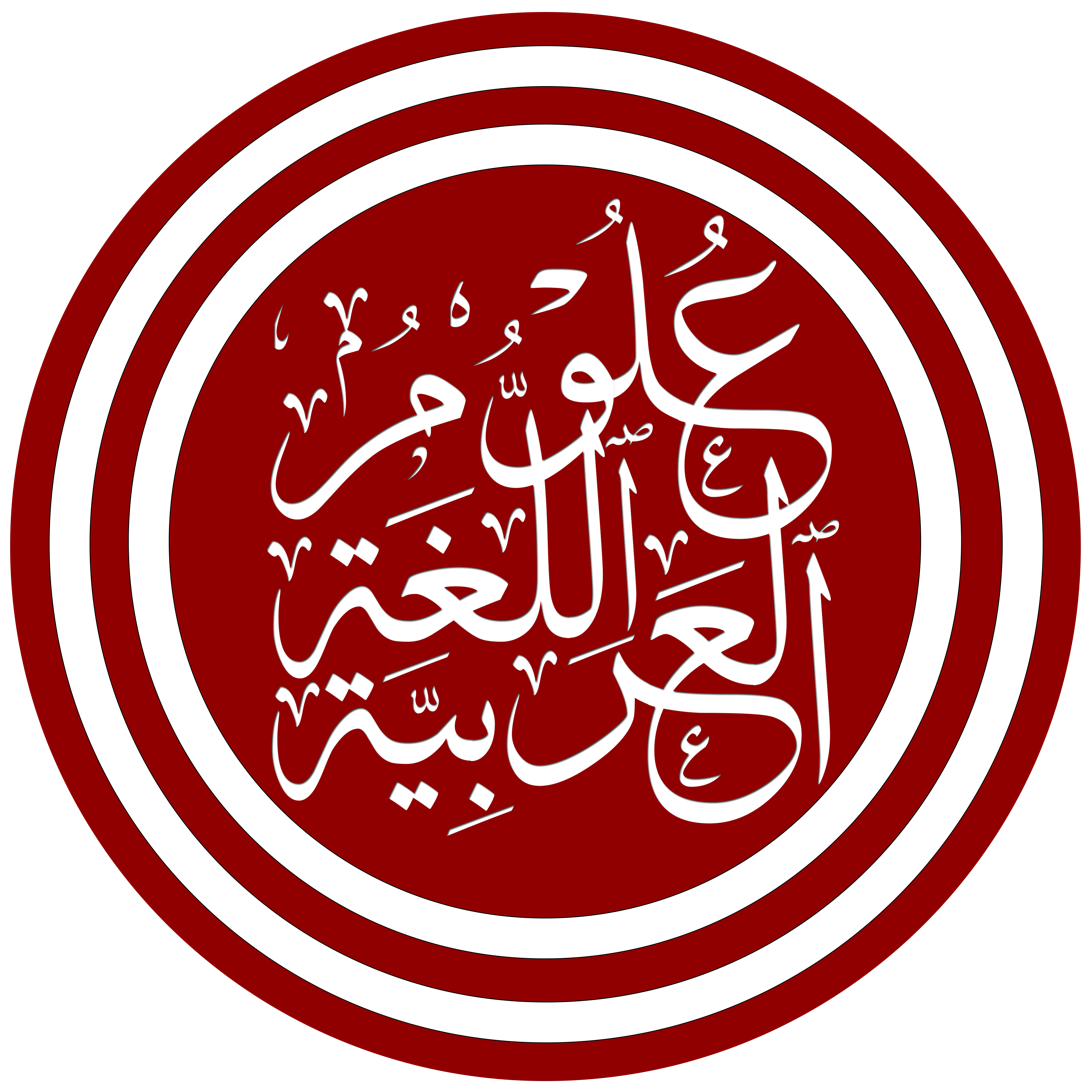
An Icon of Arabic Language Studies

ʿArūḍ (Arabic: اَلْعَرُوض, al-ʿarūḍ) or ʿilm al-ʿarūḍ (عِلم العَروض) is the study of poetic meters, which identifies the meter of a poem and determines whether the meter is sound or broken in lines of the poem. It is often called the Science of Poetry (Arabic: عِلْم اَلشِّعْر, ʿilm aš-šiʿr). Its laws were laid down by Al-Khalīl ibn Aḥmad al-Farāhīdī (d. 786), an early Arab lexicographer and philologist. In his book Al-ʿArḍ (Arabic: العرض), which is no longer extant, he described 15 types of meter. Later Al-Akhfash al-Akbar described a 16th meter, the mustadārik.

Following al-Khalil, the Arab prosodists scan poetry not in terms of syllables but in terms of vowelled and unvowelled letters, which were combined into larger units known as watid or watad "peg" (pl. awtād) and sabab "cord" (pl. asbāb). These larger units make up feet (rukn, pl. arkān).

Western prosodists, on the other hand, usually analyse the meters in terms of syllables, which can be long (–), short (u) and anceps (x), that is, a syllable which can be optionally long or short. Certain meters also have biceps positions where a pair of short syllables can optionally be replaced by a long one.

The great majority (85-90%) of early classical Arabic poetry is composed in just four meters: the ṭawīl (which is the most common), the kāmil, the wāfir and the basīṭ.

Rhyme is an important part of classical Arabic poetry. Almost all Arabic poetry is composed in couplets and the same rhyme is used in the second half of each couplet throughout the poem.

== Meters ==
The feet of an Arabic poem are traditionally represented by mnemonic words called tafāʿīl (تفاعيل). In most poems there are eight of these: four in the first half of the verse and four in the second; in other cases, there will be six of them, meaning three in the first half of the verse and three in the second.

The buḥūr (بحور) (meters) (sg. baḥr بحر), identified according to the traditional method, are the following. Underneath each meter is its scansion by the European method (read from left to right), where – = a long syllable, u = a short syllable, x = either long or short, uu = 1 long or two shorts.

The meters most commonly used are those of circles 1 and 2 (apart from the madīd, which is rare). Those meters marked with an asterisk (*) are mainly theoretical, and in practice rarely used by poets.

=== Circle 1 ===
Ṭawīl (طَوِيل) "long": Faʿūlun Mafāʿīlun Faʿūlun Mafāʿilun (فَعُولُنْ مَفَاعِيلُنْ فَعُولُنْ مَفَاعِلُنْ)

| u – x | u – – – | u – x | u – u – |

Madīd (مَدِيد) "protracted": Fāʿilātun Fāʿilun Fāʿilātun (فَاعِلَاتُنْ فَاعِلُنْ فَاعِلَاتُنْ)

| x u – – | x u – | x u – – |

Basīṭ (بَسِيط) "spread out": Mustafʿilun Fāʿilun Mustafʿilun Faʿilun (مُسْتَفْعِلُنْ فَاعِلُنْ مُسْتَفْعِلُنْ فَعِلُنْ)

| x – u – | x u – | – – u – | uu – |

=== Circle 2 ===
Kāmil (كَامِل) "complete": Mutafāʿilun Mutafāʿilun Mutafāʿilun (مُتَفَاعِلُنْ مُتَفاعِلُنْ مُتَفَاعِلُنْ)

| uu – u – | uu – u – | uu – u – |

Wāfir (وَافِر) "abundant": Mufāʿalatun Mufāʿalatun Faʿūlun (مُفَاعَلَتُنْ مُفاعَلَتُنْ فَعولُنْ)

| u – uu – | u – uu – | u – – |

=== Circle 3 ===
Hazaj (هَزَج) "trilling": Mafāʿīlun Mafāʿīlun (مَفَاعِيلُنْ مَفَاعِيلُنْ)

| u – – x | u – – x |

Rajaz (رَجَز) "trembling": Mustafʿilun Mustafʿilun Mustafʿilun (مُسْتَفْعِلُنْ مُسْتَفْعِلُنْ مُسْتَفْعِلُنْ)

| x – u – | x – u – | x – u – |

Ramal (رَمَل) "trotting": Fāʿilātun Fāʿilātun Fāʿilun (فَاعِلَاتُنْ فَاعِلَاتُنْ فَاعِلُنْ)

| x u – – | x u – – | x u – |

=== Circle 4 ===
Sarīʿ (سَرِيع) "swift": Mustafʿilun Mustafʿilun Fāʿilun (مُسْتَفْعِلُنْ مُسْتَفْعِلُنْ فَاعِلُنْ)

| x x u – | x x u – | – u – |

Munsariħ (مُنْسَرِح) "quick-paced": Mustafʿilun Fāʿilātu Muftaʿilun (مُسْتَفْعِلُن فَاعِلَاتْ مُفْتَعِلُنْ)

| x – u – | – x – u | – u u – |

Khafīf (خَفِيف) "light": Fāʿilātun Mustafʿilun Fāʿilātun (فَاعِلَاتُنْ مُسْتَفْعِلُنْ فَاعِلَاتُنْ)

| x u – x | – – u – | x u – x |

*Muḍāriʿ (مُضَارِع) "similar": Mafāʿīlu Fāʿilātun (مَفَاعِيلُ فَاعِلَاتُنْ)

| u – x x | – u – – |

*Muqtaḍab (مُقْتَضَبّ) "untrained": Fāʿilātu Muftaʿilun (فَاعِلَاتُ مُفْتَعِلُنْ)

| x u – u | – u u – |

Mujtathth (مُجْتَثّ) "cut-off": Mustafʿilun Fāʿilātun (مُسْتَفْعِلُنْ فَاعِلَاتُنْ)

| x – u – | x u – – |

=== Circle 5 ===
Mutaqārib (مُتَقَارِب) "nearing": Faʿūlun Faʿūlun Faʿūlun Faʿūlun (فَعُولُنْ فَعُولُنْ فَعُولُنْ فَعُولُنْ)

| u – x | u – x | u – x | u – |

*Mutadārik (مُتَدَارِك) "overtaking": Faʿilun Faʿilun Faʿilun Faʿilun (فَعِلُنْ فَعِلُنْ فَعِلُنْ فَعِلُنْ)

| x u – | x u – | x u – | (x u –) | ( – can be substituted for u u)

Sequences of three short syllables are not found in any Arabic meter, except occasionally in a variation of the rajaz meter, in which | x – u – | may sometimes be replaced by | x u u – |.

== Frequency of the meters ==
Analysis of anthologies of classical Arabic poetry shows that some of these meters are much more common than others. The most common meter by far in early poetry is the ṭawīl; the kāmil, wāfir, and basīṭ are also fairly common; the rajaz/sarīʿ (which are sometimes considered to be variants of the same meter) and the mutaqārib occur occasionally; and the others are rarely found.

Thus in Vadet's (1955) corpus of Bedouin poetry of the 1st–3rd century AD, containing nearly 2,300 poems and fragments, the ṭawīl is used in 50% of the poems, the kāmil in 18%, the wāfir in 14%, and the basīṭ in 11%. The rajaz/sarī' make 3%, mutaqārib 2.4%, and all the rest together about 2%.

In Stoetzer's (1986) corpus of 130 poems of the 8th century, the ṭawīl accounts for 35% of the poems, kāmil 20%, wāfir 14%, basīṭ 13%, rajaz/sarīʿ 3%, mutaqārib 7%, and the rest about 6%.

Among the 1385 short poems included in the Arabian Nights, ṭawīl is used in 24%, basīṭ 24%, kāmil 23%, wāfir 10%, ramal 2%, rajaz 2%, xafīf 5%, sarīʿ 4%, munsarih 1%, mujtatt 1%, and mutaqārib 3%. The madīd and the hazaj almost never occur, and the mutadārik, muḍāri', and muqtaḍab do not occur at all. These last three were usually regarded as artificial meters. The mutadārik breaks almost all regular rules of meter, however it was highly regarded by Arabic Grammarians in the 10th century CE, and was noted for its eloquence. Its earliest attestation is in the 7th century CE by Amr Bin Jabir Al Jani in a poem for praise of the prophet:

أشَجاكَ تَشَتُّتُ شِعْبِ الحَيِّ == فأنْتَ لَهُ أرِقٌ وَصِبُ

The collated figures can be expressed in a table as follows:

Metre	Vadet 1st–3rd C	Stoetzer 8th C	Arabian Nights 9th–10th C
ṭawīl	50%	35%	24%
basīṭ	11%	13%	24%
kāmil	18%	20%	23%
wāfir	14%	14%	10%
ramal			2%
rajaz/sarīʿ	3%	3%	2% + 4%
xafīf			5%
munsarih			1%
mujtatt			1%
mutaqārib		7%	3%
others	2%	6%	<1%

== Al-Khalil's terminology ==
Al-Khalil was primarily a grammarian and using the grammatical terminology of his day he made use of the terms ḥarf mutaḥarrik "mobile letter" (i.e. one followed by a vowel) and ḥarf sākin "quiescent letter" (i.e. one not followed by a vowel) to build up larger prosodic units, which he called "peg" (watid or watad, pl. awtād) and "cord" or "guy-rope" (sabab, pl. asbāb). In European descriptions, these are conventionally abbreviated "P" and "K" respectively. A "peg" is a sequence of two syllables, usually short + long (u –) (a watid majmūʿ); but occasionally in the rarely used metres of circle 4, long + short (– u) (a watid mafrūk). A "cord" is a short syllable (u), long syllable (–), or two shorts (u u). Surprisingly, al-Khalil's system makes no use of the concept of the syllable as such.

The watid is repeated at fixed points along the line and is generally unchanging, while the asbāb or cords are the syllables in between which could be modified. A peg and either one or two cords makes a rukn (pl. arkān) "tent pole or support" or what in European terms is called a foot. Thus a half-line of the ṭawīl metre (faʿūlun mafāʿīlun faʿūlun mafāʿilun, | u – x | u – x – | u – x | u – u – |) is analysed as PK PKK PK PKK. A complete line of poetry usually consists of either six or eight feet, but sometimes shorter lines are found.

When analysing a verse, an Arab prosodist begins by rewriting the line phonetically, that is, as it is actually pronounced. Doubled letters are written twice and silent letters, such as the alif of the article when it follows a vowel, are omitted. Thus the word اَلْكَرِيم, al-karīm in ʿarūḍ writing is written phonetically as "لكريم". In a word like al-shams (اَلْشَّمْس, pronounced (a)š-šams, meaning "the sun"), where the "l" of the article is assimilated to the first consonant of the noun, the actual sound is written instead; so in ʿarūḍ writing, this is written ششمس (ššms). Then each mobile letter is represented by a vertical line (ا), known as mutaḥarrik, and each quiescent letter by a small circle (ه), known as sukūn. Thus a watid will be represented in the scansion by two mutaḥarrik symbols and one sukūn.

A line of poetry, known as a bayt (بيت "tent"), is composed of two half-lines or hemistichs, each of which is known as a miṣrāʿ (مصراع "door-flap"). The first half-line is called the ṣadr (صَدْر, literally "forepart"), and the other is called the ʿajuz (عَجُز, literally "rear"). The ṣadr and the ʿajuz have two parts each:

- The last word of the ṣadr is called the ʿarūḍ ("central pole of a tent") and the rest of it is called ḥashū ṣ-ṣadr (حَشُو ٱلصَّدْر, meaning "the filling of the forepart")
- The last word of the ʿajuz is called the ḍarb (literally "the hitting (of the tent-peg)") and the rest of it is called ḥashu l-ʿajuz (حَشُو ٱلْعَجُز, meaning "the filling of the rear").

The last consonant of the ḍarb and the vowel that comes after it are called the rawiyy (رويّ) and its last two sākins, all the mutaḥarrik letters that are in between, and the last mutaḥarrik before them, is called the qāfīyah (قَافِيَّة) or 'rhyme'.

== Al-Khalil's circles ==
Khalil noticed that the metres can be divided into different groups. If a meter is written out in a circle, then by starting in different places on the circle it is possible to derive the other meters of the same group. Expressed in terms of syllables rather than Khalil's silent and moving letters, the different circles can be tabulated as follows. The columns marked P are the "pegs" (awtād), while between each peg and the next are either one or two "cords" (asbāb). The order of metres is the one traditionally used by poets such as Al-Maʿarri, who arranged his poems not only by rhyme by also metrically.

Circle	Meter	P		P		P		P		P		P	
1	Ṭawīl; Madīd; Basīṭ	u –	x x	u – u –	x x x x x x	u – u – u –	x x x	u – u – u –	x x x x x x	u – u –	x	u –	
2	Wāfir; Kāmil	u –	xx x xx x	u – u –	xx x xx x	u – u –	xx x xx x	u – u –	xx x xx x	u –			
3	Hazaj; Rajaz; Ramal	u –	x x x x x	u – u – u –	x x x x x x	u – u – u –	x x x x x x	u – u – u –	x x x x x x	u – u –	x		
4	Sarīʿ; Munsariħ; Khafīf; *Muḍāriʿ; *Muqtaḍab; Mujtathth		x x	u –	x x x x x	u – u – u – u –	x x x x x x x x x x x	– u – u – u – u – u – u	x x x x x x x x x x	u – u – u – u – u –	x x x x x x x	u – u –	x
5	Mutaqārib; *Mutadārik	u –	x x	u – u –	x x	u – u –	x x	u – u –	x x	u –			

Meters in the same circle have similar features. For example, the meters in circle 1 all make use of feet of 3 syllables alternating with feet of 4 syllables. Both meters in circle 2 make use of biceps elements, in which a pair of short syllables can be replaced by a long one (uu); meters of circle 4 all have one place in the hemistich (half-line) where the watid is a trochee (– u) instead of an iamb (u –); the meters of circle 5 have short feet of PK PK or KP KP.

The above meters are given in their tetrameter form, but some (such as the madīd) are generally found with only three feet per hemistich.

As Stoetzer (1982) points out, the anceps syllables (x) in tables such as the above are in many cases not really anceps, but merely an abstraction to make it seem that two different meters belong to the same circle. For example, the penultimate syllable of the Ṭawīl (the 13th) in practice is always short, while the corresponding syllable in Basīṭ (the 8th) is always long.

== Variations ==
Variations of these meters can be found. Some exist in shorter or longer forms, for example with either three or four feet in each half-line (known as trimeter and tetrameter respectively). Some meters have a catalectic variation, in which the end of the line is shortened by one syllable.

A whole series of Arabic technical terms exists to describe these variations. Minor variations which affect the cords only are known as ziḥāfāt (singular: ziḥāf); major variations which affect the beginning or end of a line are known as ʿilal (singular ʿilla). There are 14 possible ziḥāfāt and 34 possible ʿilal.

For example, if the foot mustafʿilun (– – u –) is replaced by mafāʿilun (u – u –), it is said to be maxbūn, that is, it has undergone the ziḥāf known as xabn "hemming" or "shortening".

If the line-ending mustafʿilun (– – u –) is replaced by mustafʿil (– – –) that is, if the line is catalectic, the meter is said to be maqṭūʿ, that is, it has undergone the ʿilla known as qaṭʿ "cutting" or "curtailment".

A full description of all the ziḥāfāt and ʿilal is given in Elwell-Sutton (1976), pp. 13–39.

== Minor rules of prosody ==
There are a number of prosodic conventions which are observed in writing and scanning Arabic poetry, of which the following are the most important:

- The case endings -u (Nominative), -a (Accusative), -i (Genitive), known as ʾiʿrāb, which in prose are always omitted in pronunciation at the end of a clause or sentence, are usually pronounced in poetry, even at the end of a sentence.
- At the end of a line (and sometimes at the end of the first hemistich), any vowel is considered long. in this position a short -i can rhyme with a long one. The vowel fatḥa (a) at the end of a line is written with an alif, as if it were a long vowel.
- The -n on the indefinite case endings -un, -an, -in is dropped at the end of a line, making -ū, -ā, -ī. (This does not apply at the end of the first half-line, however.)
- The ending -hu "his" is frequently pronounced with a long vowel: -hū. The pronoun anā "I" can also be scanned as ana.
- A long ī can occasionally rhyme with a long ū; for example, al-nīlu "the Nile" can rhyme with maqbūlu "acceptable".
- Although the two halves of a bayt are usually separate, it is not uncommon to find lines where there is no break between them, and a word continues across the division in the middle of the line.

== See also ==
- Arabic phonology
- Arabic grammar
- Metre (poetry) § The Arabic metres

== Bibliography ==
- Abdel-Malek, Zaki N. (2019)Towards a New Theory of Arabic Prosody (5th edition).
- Alnagdawi, M., et al. (2013). "Finding Arabic Poem Meter using Context Free Grammar". J. of Commun. and Comput. Eng. 3.1.52-59
- Elwell-Sutton, L.P. (1976).The Persian Metres. Cambridge University Press.
- Frolov, Dmitry (1996). "The Circles of al-Khalil and the structure of Luzumiyyat of Abu 'l-'Ala' al-Ma'arri". Studies in Near Eastern Languages and Literatures. Memorial Volume of Karel Petraček, Praha, 1996, 223-236.
- Golston, Chris & Riad, Tomas (1997). "The Phonology of classical Arabic meter". Linguistics 35 (1997), 111-132.
- Maling, J.M. (1973). The Theory of Classical Arabic Metrics. Massachusetts Institute of Technology. PhD Thesis.
- McCarus, Ernest N. (1983). "Identifying the Meters of Arabic Poetry", Al-'Arabiyya vol 16. no. 1/2, pp. 57–83. (Georgetown University Press).
- Scott, Hazel (2009). "Pegs, Cords, and Ghuls: Meter of Classical Arabic Poetry". Swarthmore College.
- Stoetzer, Willem (1982). "Some Observations on Quantity in Arabic Metrics". Journal of Arabic Literature, Vol. 13 (1982), pp. 66–75. (JSTOR)
- Stoetzer, W.F.G.J. (1989), Theory and Practice in Arabic Metrics, Het Oosters Instituut, Leiden.
- Weil, Gotthold (1958), Grundriss und System der altarabischen Metren (Wiesbaden).
- Wright, W. (1951). A Grammar of the Arabic Language, vol. II, Cambridge University Press, pp. 350–390.
