= Basit =

Metre used in classical Arabic poetry

Basīṭ (Arabic: بسيط) or al-basīṭ (البسيط), is a metre used in classical Arabic poetry. The word literally means "extended" or "spread out" in Arabic. Along with the ṭawīl, kāmil, and wāfir, it is one of the four most common metres used in pre-Islamic and classical Arabic poetry.

== Form of the metre ==
The metrical form of the basīṭ is often as follows (where "–" is a long syllable, "u" is a short syllable, and "x" is anceps, i.e., a syllable which can be either long or short):

| x – u – | x u – | – – u – | u u – |

The mnemonic words (tafāʿīl) used by Arab prosodists to describe this metre are: Mustafʿilun Fāʿilun Mustafʿilun Faʿilun (مُسْتَفْعِلُنْ فَاعِلُنْ مُسْتَفْعِلُنْ فَعِلُنْ).

The metre is usually used in couplets of eight feet each.

== Example ==
An example is the qasīda by al-Mutanabbi (915–965): “The poet reproaches Sayf al-Dawla” (king of Aleppo), a poem of 38 couplets, from which come the following well-known verses:

| u – u – | u u – | – – u – | u u – |
| u – u – | – u – | – – u – | u u – |

إذا رَأيْـتَ نُيُـوبَ اللّيْـثِ بـارِزَةً ٭ فَـلا تَظُـنّـنّ أنّ اللّيْـثَ يَبْتَسِـمُ
و مهجـة مهجتي من هم صاحبها ٭ أدركتـــه بجواد ظهره حـــرم
رجلاه في الركض رجل و اليدان يد ٭ وفعلـــه ماتريد الكف والقدم
ومرهف سرت بين الجحفليـــن به ٭ حتى ضربت و موج الموت يلتطم
الخيل والليل والبيــداء تعرفنــــي ٭ والسيف والرمح والقرطاس و القلم

’iḏā ra’ayta nuyūba l-layṯi bārizatan
falā taẓunnanna ’anna l-layṯa yabtasimū

wamuhjatin muhjatī min hammi ṣāḥibihā
adraktuhā bĭ-jawādin ḍahruhū ḥaramu

rijlāhu fir-rakḍi rijlun wal-yadāni yadun
wa-fi’luhū mā turīdu l-kaffu wal-qadamu

wa-murhafin sirtu bayna l-jaḥfalayni bihi
ḥattā ḍarabtŭ wa-mawju l-mawti yaltaṭimu

al-ḵaylu wal-laylu wal-baydā’u ta‘rifunī
was-sayfu war-rumḥu wal-qirṭāsu wal-qalamu

If you see the lion’s fangs on display
do not imagine for a moment that the lion is smiling.

And a soul whose owner’s concern was my soul
I have overtaken on a steed whose back was inviolable;

His two hind legs in the galloping were one and his two forelegs were one,
and his action was whatever my hand and my foot desired.

And I have ridden with a blade between the two armies,
until I struck while the wave of death was crashing round me.

The horses and the night and the desert know me
and the sword and the spear and the paper and the pen.

== Variations ==
Although in the poem of al-Mutanabbi quoted above, the last foot of each half-verse is always | u u – |, other poets use the metre in the following form, where "uu" represents a biceps element, i.e. one where the two short syllables can optionally be replaced by one long one.

| x – u – | x u – | – – u – | uu – |

An example is the following drinking-song by Abu Nuwas which begins:

دَعْ عَنْكَ لَوْمي فإنّ اللّوْمَ إغْرَاءُ * ودَاوني بالّتي كانَتْ هيَ الدّاءُ

daʿ ʿanka lawmī fa-’inna l-lawma ’iḡrā’u
wa-dāwinī bil-latī kānat hiya d-dā’u
| – – u – | – u – | – – u – | – – |
| u – u – | – u – | – – u – | – – |

"Censure me not, for censure but tempts me;
cure me rather with the cause of my ill—"

The metre also exists in a trimeter form of which the half-verse is as follows:

| x – u – | – u – | x – u – |

There is also a catalectic trimeter form:

| x – u – | – u – | x – – |

Occasionally the first foot of each half-verse can be | – u u – |.

Very rarely (in less than 1% of lines) the third foot can be | u – u – |.

== In a musical context ==
The term basīṭ is also used in a musical context; in the Andalusi nubah, or classical suites, of Morocco, each nubah, or suite, is divided into five main movements (called mīzān ميزان; plural: mawāzīn موازين) each of which uses a different rhythm, as follows:

1. Basīṭ (بسيط, 6/4)
2. Qāim wa nusf (قائم ونصف, 8/4)
3. Btāyhī (طايحي, 8/4)
4. Darj (درج, 4/4)
5. Quddām (قدام, 3/4 or 6/8)

== See also ==
- Arabic prosody
- Tawil
- Metron (poetry)
