= Tetrameter =

Poetic meter of four metrical feet

In poetry, a tetrameter is a line of four metrical feet. However, the particular foot can vary, as follows:

- Anapestic tetrameter:
  - "And the sheen of their spears was like stars on the sea" (Lord Byron, "The Destruction of Sennacherib")
  - "Twas the night before Christmas when all through the house" ("A Visit from St. Nicholas")
  - "And since birth I've been cursed with this curse to just curse / And just blurt this berserk and bizarre shit that works" (Eminem, "The Way I Am")
- Iambic tetrameter:
  - "Because I could not stop for Death" (Emily Dickinson, eponymous lyric)
- Trochaic tetrameter:
  - "Peter, Peter, pumpkin-eater" (English nursery rhyme)
- Dactylic tetrameter:
  - Picture your self in a boat on a river with [...] (The Beatles, "Lucy in the Sky with Diamonds")
- Spondaic tetrameter:
  - Long sounds move slow
- Pyrrhic tetrameter (with spondees ["white breast" and "dim sea"]):
  - And the white breast of the dim sea
- Amphibrachic tetrameter:
  - And, speaking of birds, there's the Russian Palooski, / Whose headski is redski and belly is blueski. (Dr. Seuss)

== See also ==
- Iambic pentameter
- Anapestic tetrameter
