= Biceps (prosody) =

Biceps is a point in a metrical pattern where a pair of short syllables can freely be replaced by a long one. In Greek and Latin poetry, it is found in the dactylic hexameter and the first half of a dactylic pentameter, and also in anapaestic metres.

It is not to be confused with resolution, which is a phenomenon where a normally long syllable in a line is sometimes replaced by two shorts. Resolution is typically found in an iambic metre such as the iambic trimeter or a trochaic metre such as the trochaic septenarius.
