= Trochaic septenarius =

Poetic metre used in Greek and Latin, especially in Roman comedy

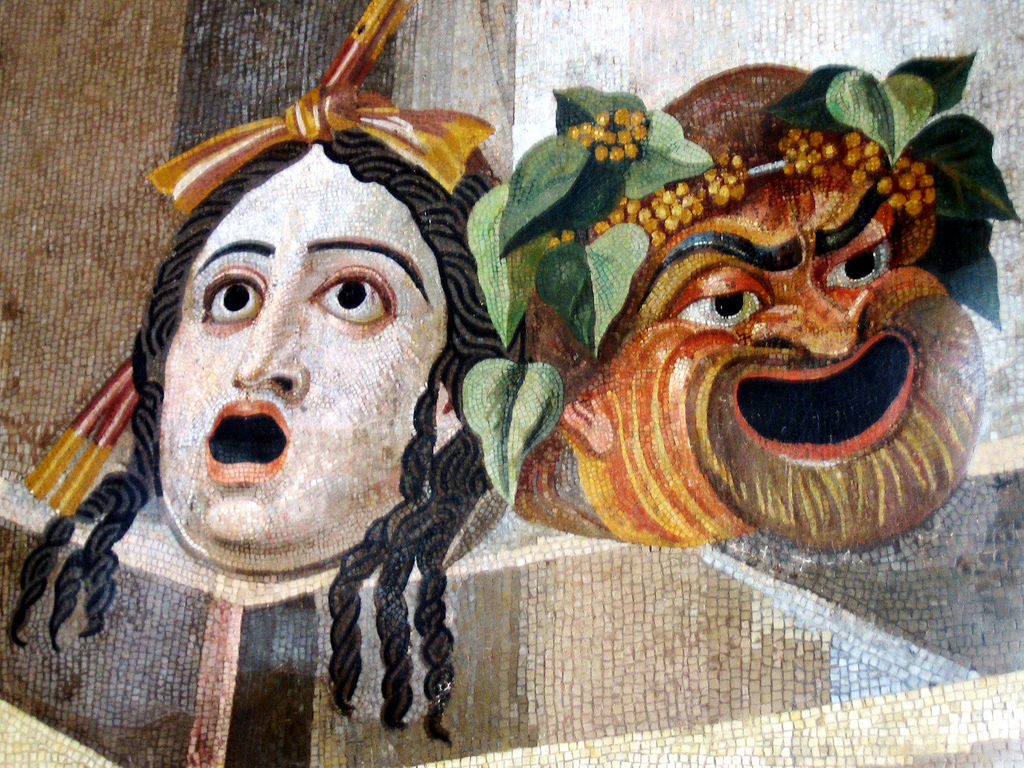
Tragic and Comic Masks of the Theatre of Ancient Greece

In ancient Greek and Latin literature, the trochaic septenarius (also known as the trochaic tetrameter catalectic) is a form of ancient poetic metre first used in 7th century BC Greek literature. It was one of the two most common metres of Roman comedy of the early 2nd century BC and was also used for the marching songs sung by soldiers at Caesar's victory parade. After a period when it was little used, it is found again in the Pervigilium Veneris (variously dated to between 2nd and 5th century AD), and taken up again as a metre for Christian hymns. The same metre, with stress-rhythm replacing quantitative metre, has continued to be used, especially for hymns and anthems, right up to the present day.

The Ancient Greeks called poems in this metre simply "tetrameters", while the name "trochaic septenarius" (or plural "trochaic septenarii") is used for Latin poems in the metre.

The basic metre consists of 15 syllables alternating strong and weak. The Greek version of the metre is as follows (where – = long, u = short, and x = an anceps syllable):

| – u – x | – u – x || – u – x | – u – |

The Latin form of the metre, as used in Roman comedy, was as follows:

| – x – x | – x – x || – x – x | – u – |

In Roman comedy it is very common for a long or anceps element to be resolved, that is, replaced by two short syllables, except at the end of the half line or line.

There is usually a dieresis (or break) in the middle of the line after the eighth element.

== Terminology ==
In ancient Greece, lines in this metre were simply known as τετράμετρα (tetrámetra) "tetrameters" without the need to add any adjective. This usage is found in Aristophanes, Xenophon, Aristotle, Plutarch, and Diodorus Siculus. Xenophon informs us that tetrameters were accompanied by the double pipe known as the aulos.

The trochaic foot (or trochee) itself (– u) was called τροχαῖος (trokhaîos) (lit. "running (foot)") by Plato and Aristotle; later the name χορεῖος (khoreîos) ("dancing (foot)") was also sometimes used. Cicero and Quintilian both use the term choreus to refer to the trochee (– u), and trochaeus to refer to the tribrach (u u u); but Quintilian adds that some people use trochaeus for the trochee and tribrachys for the tribrach. Quintilian uses the adjective trochaicus to describe an iambic senarius with a lot of tribrachs in it.

The name septenarius, meaning "of seven (feet)", is first used by Cicero, who after quoting some lines of a speech of Hector's ghost from Pacuvius's tragedy Iliona comments "I don't know why he is afraid, when he is pouring out such fine septenarii to the sound of the tibiae." In fact, however, the lines he quotes are not trochaic or iambic septenarii but the very similar iambic octonarii. The term septenarius is also used twice by the grammarian Diomedes (4th century AD), referring once to the trochaic and once to the iambic septenarius. Otherwise it seems to have been little used.

The grammarian Marius Victorinus (4th century) called the metre trochaici tetrametri catalectici or tetrametrus archilochius catalecticus; but he added quem nos quadratum dicimus ("which we call the quadratus"). Atilius Fortunatianus (also 4th century) agrees that quadratus is an alternative name for the trochaic tetrameter catalectic metre. But the word quadratus ("square") was also used for tetrameters in other metres, for example the iambic septenarius or the iambic octonarius.

In the 8th century, Bede referred to this metre as the metrum trochaicum tetrametrum. Another medieval writer who discussed the metre is Alberic of Monte Cassino, an 11th-century scholar and monk, who called it the decapentecus rithmus, referring to the fact that in his day it had exactly 15 syllables.

== In Greek ==
=== In Archilochus ===
The name septenarius is strictly applied only to Latin poetry, but it has predecessors in Greek. It was first used as early as the 7th century BC by Archilochus. An example is the fragment which begins as follows:

θυμέ, θύμ᾽ ἀμηχάνοισι // κήδεσιν κυκώμενε,
ἄνα δέ, δυσμενέων δ᾽ ἀλέξευ // προσβαλὼν ἐναντίον

thumé, thúm᾽ amēkhánoisi // kḗdesin kukṓmene,
ána dé, dusmenéōn d᾽ aléxeu // prosbalṑn enantíon

| – u – u | – u – u || – u – u | – u – |
| uu u – u | – u – – || – u – u | – u – |

"My Soul, my Soul, all disturbed by sorrows inconsolable,
Bear up, hold out, meet front-on the many foes that rush on you."

In the above example, the metre is fairly regular. There are two resolutions in the fragment, one at the beginning of a line, the other (not shown above) at the beginning of a half-line. The anceps syllables are often short.

According to Aristotle this metre was used in the early satyr plays; but in the extant Greek plays it only occurs occasionally, much less often than in Plautus and Terence's Latin plays.

=== In tragedy ===
In tragedy the style of the trochaic tetrameter is more regular, and there is always a break in the centre of the line. In Aeschylus's tragedy, the Persians, of 472 BC, Xerxes' father King Darius rises from the dead and talks to his wife Atossa in trochaic tetrameters. Part of his speech is as follows:

παῖς δ᾽ ἐμὸς τάδ᾽ οὐ κατειδὼς // ἤνυσεν νέῳ θράσει:
ὅστις Ἑλλήσποντον ἱρὸν // δοῦλον ὣς δεσμώμασιν
ἤλπισε σχήσειν ῥέοντα, // Βόσπορον ῥόον θεοῦ:
καὶ πόρον μετερρύθμιζε, // καὶ πέδαις σφυρηλάτοις
περιβαλὼν πολλὴν κέλευθον // ἤνυσεν πολλῷ στρατῷ,

paîs d᾽ emòs tád᾽ ou kateidṑs // ḗnusen néōi thrásei:
hóstis Hellḗsponton hiròn // doûlon hṑs desmṓmasin
ḗlpise skhḗsein rhéonta, // Bósporon rhóon theoû:
kaì póron meterrhúthmize, // kaì pédais sphurēlátois
peribalṑn pollḕn kéleuthon // ḗnusen pollôi stratôi,

| – u – – | – u – – || – u – – | – u – |
| – u – – | – u – – || – u – – | – u – |
| – u – – | – u – – || – u – – | – u – |
| – u – – | – u – – || – u – – | – u – |
| uu u – – | – u – – || – u – – | – u – |

"My son, in his ignorance, did these things with youthful audacity:
he dared to hold back from flowing, like a slave in chains,
the sacred Hellespont, the Bosporus, the stream of God;
and he tried to change its passage, and chaining it with hammer-forged shackles
created a great causeway for his huge army."

In this passage, Aeschylus adopts a style which was later imitated by Seneca in his tragedies. A resolved element occurs only once in these five lines. All the anceps syllables are long. There is a break in the centre of the line but not after the 1st or 3rd metron.

=== In comedy ===
The following example, from the opening chorus of Aristophanes' comedy The Knights, shows a very different style of the metre. There is a word-division at the end of almost every metron and the anceps positions are often short:

παῖε παῖε τὸν πανοῦργον // καὶ ταραξιππόστρατον
καὶ τελώνην καὶ φάραγγα // καὶ Χάρυβδιν ἁρπαγῆς,
καὶ πανοῦργον καὶ πανοῦργον: // πολλάκις γὰρ αὔτ᾽ ἐρῶ.
καὶ γὰρ οὗτος ἦν πανοῦργος // πολλάκις τῆς ἡμέρας.

paîe paîe / tòn panoûrgon // kaì taraxippóstraton
kaì telṓnēn / kaì pháranga // kaì Khárubdin harpagês,
kaì panoûrgon / kaì panoûrgon: // pollákis gàr / aút᾽ erô.
kaì gàr hoûtos / ên panoûrgos // pollákis tês / hēméras.

| – u – u | – u – – || – u – – | – u – |
| – u – – | – u – u || – u – u | – u – |
| – u – – | – u – – || – u – u | – u – |
| – u – u | – u – – || – u – – | – u – |

"Strike, strike the villain, who has spread confusion amongst the ranks of the Knights,
this public robber, this yawning gulf of plunder, this devouring Charybdis,
this villain, this villain, this villain! I cannot say the word too often,
for he is a villain a thousand times a day." (tr. Eugene O'Neill, Jr., 1938)

Occasionally in comedy there is no central dieresis, as in the following line from Aristophanes' comedy The Birds (286):

αἵ τε θήλειαι προσεκτίλλουσιν αὐτοῦ τὰ πτερά.

haí te thḗleiai prosektíllousin autoû tà pterá.

| – u – – | – u – – | – u – – | – u – |

"and the female ones also pluck out its feathers"

By adding an extra syllable at the beginning, the line can become an iambic tetrameter, as in the first line below. The following lines come from later in the same passage of Aristophanes' Birds in a passage of otherwise regular trochaics. The second and third lines below do not have the normal dieresis after the 8th element, but have one after the 7th element, so that the last eight elements form a separate unit. In this they are like the iambic tetrameter which precedes them. The final line is normal:

ἰοὺ ἰοὺ τῶν ὀρνέων, // ἰοὺ ἰοὺ τῶν κοψίχων·
οἷα πιππίζουσι καὶ τρέχουσι διακεκραγότες.
ἆρ᾽ ἀπειλοῦσίν γε νῷν; οἴμοι, κεχήνασίν γέ τοι,
καὶ βλέπουσιν ἐς σὲ κἀμέ. – // τοῦτο μὲν κἀμοὶ δοκεῖ.

ioù ioù tôn ornéōn, // ioù ioù tôn kopsíkhōn;
hoîa pippízousi kaì tré/khousi diakekragótes.
âr᾽ apeiloûsín ge nôin? oímoi, kekhḗnasín gé toi,
kaì blépousin es sè kamé. – // toûto mèn kamoì dokeî.

| u – u – | – – u – || u – u – | – – u – | (iambic)
| – u – – | – u – / u | – u uu u | – u – | (iambic-like trochaic)
| – u – – | – u – / – | – u – – | – u – |
| – u – u | – u – – || – u – – | – u – | (normal trochaic)

"Oh! Oh! what a lot of birds! Oh! Oh! What a lot of blackbirds!
Look at them cheeping and running around squawking at one another!
Are they threatening us two? Oh no! They're gaping at us, I tell you,
and they're looking at you and me!" – "I think so too!"

== In early Latin ==
The metre in early Latin tragedy and comedy is relatively free, and even the elements which are short in Greek are often represented by long syllables; but when they are long, these are usually unaccented so as to maintain the basic rhythm. The basic shape of the line is therefore:

| – x – x | – x – x || – x – x | – u – |

As in Greek, often a long or anceps element (except immediately before the end of the verse or hemistich) is resolved into two short syllables, as with mulier and melior in the first quotation below.

=== In tragedy ===
The trochaic septenarius metre was used in early Latin tragedies by authors such as Livius, Naevius, Ennius and Pacuvius. However, these have not survived except for a few lines quoted in other authors. The following example, preserved by Cicero, comes from Ennius's tragedy Alexander, and is spoken by the prophet Cassandra to her mother Hecuba. It is remarkable for its alliteration, as well as the four-word second line:

mātēr, opti/mārum multō // mulier meliōr / mulierum,
missa sum su/perstitiōsīs // hariolāti/ōnibus.
neque m(ē) Apollō / fātīs fandīs // dēment(em) invī/tam ciēt.

| – – – u | – – – – || uu – uu – | uu u – |
| – u – u | – uu – – || uu u – u | – u – |
| uu u – – | – – – – || – – – – | – u – |

"Mother, best woman by far of the best of women,
I have been sent by superstitious premonitions;
nor does Apollo, by speaking the fates, make me lose my mind against my will."

In another quotation from the same play, the first word adest is shortened to two short syllables (u u) by a process known as brevis brevians, commonly found in early Latin comedies:

adĕst adest fax / obvolūta // sanguin(e) atqu(e) in/cendiō
multōs annōs / latuit. cīvēs, // fert(e) op(em) et res/tinguite!

| uu u – – | – u – – || – u – – | – u – |
| – – – – | uu – – – || – u – – | – u – |

"It is here, it is here, the torch wrapped in blood and fire!
It lay hidden for many years. Citizens, bring help and extinguish it!"

=== In comedy ===
In early Latin, in the comedies of Plautus and Terence, the trochaic septenarius is one of the two commonest metres (the other being the iambic senarius); in fact more than a third of the lines in the two poets are trochaic septenarii.

The style in comedy is usually very conversational, often with no break in sense in the centre of the line. An example from Plautus's Captivi is the following:

i(am) ĕgŏ revertār / intrō, s(ī) ex hīs // quae vol(ō) exquī/sīverō.
ŭbĭ sunt istī / quōs ant(e) aedīs // iuss(ī) hūc prōdū/cī forās?

| uu u – – | – – – – || – u – – | – u – |
| uu – – – | – – – – || – – – – | – u – |

"Now I shall go back inside, to see if I can find out from these people what I want.
Where are those people I ordered to be brought out here in front of the house?"

The second line above consists mostly of spondees (– –) instead of trochees (– u), but as in most septenarii, the word accents are arranged so that the 2nd, 6th and 10th positions, where in Greek a short syllable would be placed, if they are long, are unaccented (Meyer's law).

In Plautus the line quite often ended with a two-syllable word, such as forās above. If so the 12th element had to be long (the Bentley-Luchs law). In later centuries, as coincidence of word accent and metre became increasingly important, two-syllable words in the final position became increasingly rare.

Sometimes in early Latin there was no break after element 8, as in the following line of Terence:

quōqu(ō) hīnc aspor/tābitur ter/rārum, certumst / persequī

| – – – – | – u – – | – – – – | – u – |

"Whichever country she is transported off to from here, I shall certainly follow her"

=== In satire ===
Although the trochaic septenarius in the early period of Roman literature was mainly used in drama, another use occurs in the 2nd-century BC satirical writer Lucilius, some of whose satires are written in this metre. The fragments have mostly been transmitted one line at a time, which some scholars have attempted to join together into paragraphs. An example is the following:

hunc labōrem / sūmās, laudem // quī tib(i) ac fruc/tum ferāt:
percrepā pug/nam Popīlī,// facta Cornē/lī cane...

tibi porr(ō) istaec / rēs idcircō (e)st // cordī, quod rē/r(e) ūtilem.
quodque t(ē) in tran/quill(um) ex saevīs // transfert tempes/tātibus.
quār(e) hoc colere (e)st / satius qu(am) illa, // studi(um) omn(e) hīc cōn/sūmere.

| – u – – | – – – – || – u – – | – u – |
| – u – – | – u – – || – u – – | – u – |
| uu – – – | – – – – || – – – – | – u – |
| – u – – | – – – – || – – – – | – u – |
| – – uu – | uu – – – || uu – – – | – u – |

"You should take up a work which will bring you praise and reward:
shout out Popillius's battle, sing the deeds of Cornelius! ...

Moreover, that hobby of yours is something you like because you think it's useful,
and something which carries you from fierce storms into a quiet place,
so it's better to cultivate this than those things, and to spend all your enthusiasm here."

The lines flow smoothly, in a similar way to the lines of Plautus quoted above. The anceps elements are often long. There are several resolved elements, and elision is frequent. The word accents frequently match the metre, but not always.

Lucilius also wrote satire in dactylic hexameters, a practice later followed by Horace, Persius, and Juvenal.

== In popular usage ==
A different form of the trochaic septenarius appears to have existed in Rome used in popular sayings and songs. An early example is the following witticism which must have been circulating after the cremation of Lucius Licinius Crassus in 91 BC:

postquam Crassus / carbo factus, // Carbo crassus / factus est

| – – – – | – – – – || – – – – | – u – |

"After Crassus became charcoal, [the orator] Carbo became fat/dull"

Lines of this kind divided into four sections, with word accent matching the metre, are sometimes known as versus quadrātus ("square verse"). Similar verses divided into four are sometimes found in Plautus. Fraenkel gives several examples, such as:

lingua poscit, / corpus quaerit, // animus ōrat, / rēs monēt.

| – u – – | – u – – || uu u – – | – u – |

"The tongue demands it, the body requires it, the mind begs for it, the situation demands it."

In some examples, the line is broken after the first and second metron only, making a three-part division:

scīs amōrem, / scīs labōrem, // scīs egestātem meam.

| – u – – | – u – – || – u – – | – u – |

"You know my love, you know my hard work, you know my poverty."

The trochaic septenarius was also used in riddles and children's sayings, such as this one, quoted by an ancient commentator on a line of Horace. It has the threefold division:

habeat scabiem / quisquis ad mē // vēnerit novissimus!

| uu – uu – | – u – – || – u – u | – u – |

"May whoever reaches me last have scabies!"

Another example of popular usage is the ribald verse sung by the soldiers at the Gallic triumph of Julius Caesar. Like the early Latin septenarius it uses long syllables in the anceps positions; but it has a strong break in sense between the two halves of the line:

Urbānī, servāt(e) uxōrēs: // moechum calv(um) addūcimus.
aur(um) in Galli(a) / effutuistī; // hīc sūmpsistī / mūtuum.

| – – – – | – – – – || – – – – | – u – |
| – – – u | – uu – – || – – – – | – u – |

"City folk, guard your wives; we're bringing you a bald adulterer.
You (sg.) fucked away your gold in Gaul; here you borrowed it."

The word accents here mostly coincide with the metrical ictus, except in the first metron, where urbáni, with a long stressed syllable on the second element, violates Meyer's law.

Several scholars believe that this popular type of septenarius was indigenous to Italy and developed separately from the septenarii of drama. However, Eduard Fraenkel has shown that very similar verses existed in Greece also at an earlier date. For example, in his life of Themistocles Plutarch records how a certain paidagogos became inspired at a sacrifice and cried out the following verse, divided into three cola:

νυκτὶ φωνήν, / νυκτὶ βουλήν, // νυκτὶ τὴν νί/κην δίδου
nuktì phōnḗn, / nuktì boulḗn, // nuktì tḕn ník/ēn dídou

| – u – – | – u – – || – u – – | – u – |

"At night give voice, at night give council, at night give the victory."

Similar verses divided into four sections are found in Aristophanes, for example:

ἥδομαι γὰρ / καὶ γέγηθα // καὶ πέπορδα / καὶ γελῶ
hḗdomai gàr / kaì gégētha // kaì péporda / kaì gelô

| – u – – | – u – u || – u – u | – u – |

"For I'm delighted and I'm thrilled and I've farted and I'm laughing!"

Another example of the popular septenarius was a satirical epigram written about a certain ex-slave called Sarmentus (he plays a part in Horace's Satires 1.5, dated 37 BC), who rose to become very rich. The joke depends on the two meanings of scrīptum ('the office of scribe' and 'a slave's brand') and the fact that sarmentum can also mean a bundle of firewood:

aliud scrīpt(um) habet Sarmentus, // aliud populus vóluerat.
digna dignīs: sīc Sarmentus // habeat crassās compedēs.
rūsticī, nē nihil agātis, aliquis Sarment(um) alliget!

| uu – – u | – – – – || uu – uu – | uu u – |
| – u – – | – – – – || uu – – – | – u – |
| – u – – | uu u – – || uu – – – | – u – |

"Sarmentus has one kind of scriptum but the people had wanted a different kind.
If people got what they deserve, Sarmentus would be wearing heavy shackles!
Country folk, don't be idle, someone tie up the sarmentum!"

== In classical Latin ==
In the classical period (1st century BC – 1st century AD), the trochaic septenarius was almost never used in serious poetry. Catullus, Horace, Vergil, Ovid, Petronius, Martial and other poets of the period make no use of it or of any trochaic metre. However, it is found in three short passages (32 lines in all) by Seneca the Younger in his tragedies. In two of these passages a character invokes the gods of the Underworld to make a curse; in the third, a messenger speaks of his religious terror when consulting the oracle in Delphi. In these lines from Phaedra King Theseus invokes a curse on himself:

Pallidī fau/cēs Avernī // vōsque, Taenari/ī specūs,
unda miserīs / grāta Lēthēs // vōsque, torpen/tēs lacūs,
impium rapit(e) / atque mersum // premite perpetu/īs malīs.

| – u – – | – u – – || – u – uu | – u – |
| – u uu – | – u – – || – u – – | – u – |
| – u – uu | – u – – || uu u – uu | – u – |

"O jaws of pale Avernus, and you, Taenarian caves,
water of Lethe, welcome to the wretched, and you, torpid lakes,
seize the impious one, swallow me up and oppress me with everlasting evils!"

Seneca follows the Greek tragic style by using the metron | – u – x |, always with a short syllable in the second position; the anceps element at positions 4, 8, and 12 is usually long. He makes use of resolution, as in miserīs or rapite in the lines above, and frequently ends the line with a two-syllable word. The word accents only partly follow the rhythm of the metre, coinciding in positions 1, 7, and 9, but elsewhere often falling on an anceps element.

== Post-classical Latin ==
=== Florus ===
Completely different in atmosphere are eight short poems in trochaic septenarius metre (26 lines in all) attributed to Works attributed to Florus, who lived in the time of the Emperor Hadrian in the early 2nd century AD. Here is one, comparing Apollo, the god of the sun, with Liber (Bacchus), the god of wine:

Sīc Apollo, / deinde Līber // sīc vidētur / ignifer:
ambo sunt flam/mīs creātī // prōsatīqu(e) ex / ignibus;
ambo dē dō/nīs calōrem, // vīt(e) et radiō, / cōnferunt;
noctis hic rum/pit tenebrās,// hic tenebrās / pectoris.

| – u – u | – u – – || – u – u | – u – |
| – u – – | – u – – || – u – – | – u – |
| – u – – | – u – – || – u uu – | – u – |
| – u – – | – u – – || – u – – | – u – |

"Both Apollo and Liber seem equally bearing of fire:
"both were created from flames and engendered from fires;
both from their gifts, wine and rays, confer warmth;
one dispels the darkness of the night, the other of the heart."

The lightness of style and the fascination with love, spring and roses in his short hexameter poems have led some to think that Florus may be the author of the Pervigilium Veneris (see below), although others date that work to the 4th century.

=== Terentianus ===
The 2nd-century grammarian Terentianus Maurus used a variety of metres in his book on sounds and metre, among them the trochaic septenarius. The scansion is similar to Seneca's and Florus's but the subject matter is quite different. Here is a sample in which he speaks of the difference between long and short diphthongs. The word accents partly follow the metre, but in the first metron there is often a clash:

αὐέρυσαν inquit poēta,// sīc et αὐτάρ corripit:
Εὔπολιν, πεύκην et εὔνουν // aut poēt(am) Εὐριπίδην;
syllabās prīmās necesse (e)st // ōre raptim prōmere;
tempus at duplum manēbit, // nihil obest correptio.
AU tamen capére vidētur // saepe prōductum sonum,
"auspicēs" cum dīc(o) et "aurum", // sīve Graecus αὔριον.
mīra nec putanda nōbīs // tālis alternātiō (e)st,
dichronon quod ἄλφα nōtum (e)st, // sīcut Ā nostrātibus.

| – u uu – | – u – u || – u – – | – u – |
| – u – – | – u – – || – u – – | – u – |
| – u – – | – u – – || – u – – | – u – |
| – u – – | – u – – || – u – – | – u – |
| – u – u | uu u – – || – u – – | – u – |
| – u – u | – u – – || – u – – | – u – |
| – u – – | – u – – || – u – – | – u – |

"ăuerusan, says the poet, and in the same way he also shortens autar ("but"),
Eupolis, peukē, and eunous, or the poet Eurīpidēs.
It's necessary to pronounce the first syllables (of these words) rapidly;
but the syllable-time will still be double; the shortening doesn't prevent that.
However, AU often seems to have a long sound,
when I say āuspices and āurum, or when a Greek says āurion ("tomorrow").
Nor should we think that such an alternation is strange,
since alpha is known to have two lengths, just as A does for us."

=== Pervigilium Veneris ===
A famous example of the metre, but with a very different mood, is the Pervigilium Veneris ("Vigil of Venus"), of uncertain date but possibly 4th century AD. Part of the poem goes as follows:

Ipsa nymphās dīva lūcō // iussit īre myrteō.
it puer comes puellīs: // nec tamen crēdī potest
ess(e) Amōrem fēriātum // sī sagittās vexerit.
īte, nymphae; posuit arma, // fēriātus est Amor! –
crās amet quī nūnqu(am) amāvit, // quīqu(e) amāvit crās amet.

| – u – – | – u – – || – u – u | – u – |
| – u – u | – u – – || – u – – | – u – |
| – u – – | – u – – || – u – – | – u – |
| – u – – | uu u – u || – u – u | – u – |
| – u – – | – u – – || – u – – | – u – |

"The goddess herself has ordered the nymphs to go into the myrtle grove;
Her son is going as companion to the girls; but it will be hard to believe
that Love is on holiday if he carries his weapons!
Go, nymphs, he has put down his arms, Love is on holiday! –
Let him love tomorrow who has never loved, and let him who has loved love tomorrow."

A difference between this poem and the Seneca is that there is frequently a word-break not only at the line centre, but also after each metron. There is therefore a high coincidence between the rhythm of the metre and the word-accent. Resolution is only very sparingly used.

=== Tiberianus ===
Another poet of the 4th century who wrote on springtime in trochaic septenarii was Tiberianus. One of his surviving poems begins as follows:

amnis ībat / inter arva // valle fūsus / frīgidā,
lūce rīdēns / calculōrum, // flōre pictus / herbidō.
caerulās su/perne laurūs // et virecta / myrtea
lēniter mō/tābat aura // blandiente / sībilō;
subtus autem / molle grāmen // flōre pulcrō / crēverat
et crocō so/lum rubēbat // et lūcēbat / līliīs
tum nemus frā/grābat omne // vīolārum / spīritū.

| – u – u | – u – u || – u – – | – u – |
| – u – – | – u – – || – u – u | – u – |
| – u – u | – u – – || – u – u | – u – |
| – u – – | – u – u || – u – u | – u – |
| – u – – | – u – – || – u – – | – u – |
| – u – u | – u – u || – – – – | – u – |
| – u – – | – u – u || – u – – | – u – |

"A stream was going through the fields, flowing down a cool valley,
laughing with the gleam of pebbles, decorated with grassy flowers;
overhead, with soothing whisper, a breeze was gently stirring
the dark-green laurels and the myrtle leaves;
while underfoot, soft grass had grown with beautiful flowers;
the earth was red with saffron and was bright with lilies;
and all the wood was fragrant with the perfume of violets."

In this style of septenarius, many of the anceps syllables are short. The word accent matches the rhythm almost exactly. The scansion is more or less correct by classical standards, apart from lucebat and violarum, which normally has a short i. There are almost no resolutions.

=== Ausonius ===
The 4th century AD poet Ausonius mostly wrote in dactylic or iambic verse; however, there are two or three short poems in the trochaic metre. One is part of a poem called Septem Sapientium Sententiae "Sayings of the Seven Sages", in which each of the seven famous wise men of antiquity is given seven sayings, in various metres. The following are the seven sayings of Solon of Athens:

Tunc beātum / dīco vītam, // cum perācta / fāta sunt.
Pār parī iu/gātor coniux: // quidquid inpār, / dissidet.
Non erunt ho/nōrēs umquam // fortuīti / mūneris.
Clam coargu/ās propinquum, // prōpalam lau/dāverīs.
Pulchrius mul/tō (e)st parārī, // quam creārī / nōbilem.
Certa sī dē/crēta sors est, // quid cavēre / prōderit?
Sīve sunt in/certa cūncta, // quid timēre / convenit?

| – u – – | – u – – || – u – u | – u – |
| – u – u | – – – – || – u – – | – u – |
| – u – u | – – – – || – u – – | – u – |
| – u – u | – u – – || – u – – | – u – |
| – u – – | – u – – || – u – – | – u – |
| – u – – | – u – – || – u – u | – u – |
| – u – – | – u – – || – u – u | – u – |

"Only then do I call a life happy when the fates are completed.
A husband should be married to an equal; whatever is unequal, quarrels.
A chance gift will never bring honours.
You should criticise a neighbour privately, but praise him publicly.
It is much finer thing to be born noble, than to be created noble.
If destiny is fixed, what good will it do to take precautions?
Or if everything is uncertain, what is the use of being afraid?"

In this short poem there are no resolutions, and the word accents match the rhythm very closely. The words however scan correctly in the classical manner, except for two places where an unaccented long syllable stands for a short element.

== In Christian hymns ==
In the middle ages, from the 4th century onwards, the trochaic septenarius became one of the favourite metres for Latin hymns. The 11th-century monk and scholar, Alberic of Monte Cassino, described the metre as having 15 syllables (8 + 7); the 7th syllable had to be long, and the 14th short. Various styles are found, some conforming to classical Latin metre, others scanned accentually, some with neither of these, except for the essential features described by Alberic. In this period the number of syllables in the line remains constant, without any resolved elements. Since in the plainsong used in the Catholic Church the syllables tend to be of equal length, the metre tended to lose its trochaic character, except for the word accent.

=== 1st style: Hilary and Bede ===
According to Bishop Isidore of Seville, the first to write hymns in Latin was Hilary of Poitiers (died c. 367), who had spent some time in exile in the east. The following hymn, which is divided into stanzas of three lines each, is attributed to Hilary. The opening refers to Christ as the "New Adam":

Ādae carnis / glōriōsa // et cadūci / corporis
In caelestī / rursum Ādam // concināmus / proelia,
Per quae prīmum / Satanās est // Ādam victus / in novō.

| – – – – | – u – – || – u – – | – u – |
| – – – – | – u – – || – u – – | – u – |
| – – – – | u u – – || – – – u | – u – |

"Of Adam's flesh and mortal body
Let us sing again in the heavenly Adam the glorious battles,
though which for the first time Satan was defeated in the New Adam."

In this style, the line often begins with spondees (– –) instead of a trochee (– u). There is usually a close match between the metrical rhythm and the word accent.

Another example in the same style is the following, sometimes ascribed to Hilary, but more probably by one of his followers of the 5th century:

Hymnum dīcat / turba frātrum, // hymnum cantus / personet,
Christō rēgī / concinentēs // laudēs dēmus / dēbitās.
Tū Deī dē / corde Verbum, // Tū Via, Tū / Vēritās

| – – – – | – u – – || – – – – | – u – |
| – – – – | – u – – || – – – – | – u – |
| – u – – | – u – – || – u – – | – u – |

"Let the crowd of brothers sing a hymn; let the song resound with a hymn.
To Christ the King, singing together, let us give praises due;
You are the Word from the heart of God; You are the Way, You the Truth."

In both of these hymns, the metre more or less conforms to the early Latin pattern, but like the popular verse quoted above, the lines are arranged in four sections in such a way that the word accents exactly follow the rhythm.

In the 8th century, the English monk Bede wrote a treatise on metre, in which he included a short section on the trochaic tetrameter, basing his description on the above hymn, which he called hymnus ille pulcherrimus "that most beautiful hymn". It is thought that he may have been the author of the hymn which begins as follows:

Appārēbunt / ante summum // saeculōrum / iūdicem
Ēnoch magnus / et Helīas // quondam raptus / in polum

| – – – – | – u – – || – u – – | – u – |
| – – – u | – u – – || – – – – | – u – |

"Before the Highest Judge of the Ages will appear
Enoch the Great and Elijah, who was once taken up into heaven."

As in Hymnum dicat there is a word break at the end of almost every metron and the word accents match the metre. A curious feature of Bede's description of the metre (which as he realised didn't in fact always apply in the hymn Hymnum dicat on which he based his description) was his ruling that the second metron should always begin with a trochee, as in the hymn quoted above. Bede's description of the metre was influential in the hymn-writing of various writers who followed him.

=== 2nd style: Prudentius ===
A second style of septenarius can be seen in the following hymn. Prudentius, born in Spain in 348, wrote in a more classical style, similar to that of Ausonius, with short syllables in positions 2, 5, and 7. Despite the classical metre, just as with the 1st style, there is a close match between the word accents and the metrical ictus.

The first of these hymns is often sung in English at Christmas with the words "Of the Father's Heart Begotten":

Corde nātus / ex parentis // ante mund(ī) ex/ordium
A et O cog/nōminātus, // ipse fōns et / clausula
Omnium quae / sunt, fuērunt, // quaeque post fu/tūra sunt.

| – u – u | – u – – || – u – – | – u – |
| – u – – | – u – – || – u – – | – u – |
| – u – – | – u – – || – u – u | – u – |

"Born from the heart of the Father, before the beginning of the world,
surnamed Alpha and Omega, He is the source and end
of all the things which are, have been, or which will be in future."

Another hymn, also still sung today (see External links below), commemorates the death of two Spanish martyrs Emeterius and Celedonius:

Scrīpta sunt Cae/lō duōrum // martyrum vo/cābula,
aureīs quae / Christus illīc // adnotāvit / litterīs:
sanguinis no/tīs eādem // scrīpta terrīs / trādidit.

| – u – – | – u – – || – u – u | – u – |
| – u – – | – u – – || – u – – | – u – |
| – u – u | – u – – || – u – – | – u – |

"Written in heaven are the names of two martyrs,
which Christ noted there in golden letters;
Likewise, written in marks of blood, he gave them to the earth.

The following hymn, "Pange lingua gloriosi proelium certaminis", was written by another Bishop of Poitiers Venantius Fortunatus in the 6th century in the same style:

Pange, lingua, / gloriosi // proelium cer/taminis
et super cru/cis trophaeo // dic triumphum / nobilem,
qualiter re/demptor orbis // immolatus / vicerit.

| – u – u | – u – – || – u – – | – u – |
| – u – u | – u – – || – u – – | – u – |
| – u – u | – u – – || – u – – | – u – |

"Tell, tongue, of the battle of the glorious fight
and over the trophy of the Cross speak of the noble triumph:
how the Redeemer of the World, by being sacrificed, was victorious."

Despite being written in the 6th century AD, the hymn conforms exactly to the scansion and prosody of Classical Latin.

=== 3rd style: Secundinus ===
A third, quite different, style of septenarius, is seen in the abecedarian Latin hymn Audite Omnes Amantes ("Hear ye, All Lovers"), believed to have been written by the Irish Saint Secundinus (Sechnall of Dunshaughlin, 5th century AD), In this style, syllable lengths do not correspond to those of classical Latin (e.g. audītē, Dēum, mērita, vīrī etc.). There are no resolutions and in a number of places there is a hiatus between words where earlier poets would make an elision (e.g. audite | omnes). In several places the word accents do not coincide with the metrical ictus (e.g. Chrísto, bónum, aequátur). However, there is usually a word accent on positions 7 and 13:

Audite, om/nes amántes // Deum, sancta / mérita
Viri in Chris/to beáti // Patricii E/píscopi:
Quomodo bo/num ob áctum // simulatur / ángelis,
Perfectamque / propter vítam // aequatur A/póstolis.

"Listen, all you who love God, the holy merits
Of the man in Christ, the blessed bishop Patrick:
How, on account of his good actions, he is like the angels,
And because of his perfect life, he is equal to the Apostles."

=== 4th style: Rhythmical ===
Bede, in his book on metre, states that there are two ways of writing hymns, metrical and rhythmical. In the rhythmical kind the word accent was important, not the syllable quantities. He quotes the anonymous hymn Apparebit repentina as an example of a composition skilfully written in trochaic metre in the rhythmical way:

Apparebit repentina dies magna Domini,
fur obscura velut nocte improvisos occupans.

"There will suddenly appear the Great Day of the Lord,
Like a thief in the dark night attacking those who are unprepared."

Here words such as repentina (u – – u) do not scan correctly according to classical prosody, but are correctly trochaic according to the word accent.

=== Later hymns ===
The introduction of accentual or rhythmical verse like Apparebit repentina did not stop scholars continuing to write metrical hymns. Written in a similar style to Bede's poem is the hymn De Gaudio Paradisi ("On the Joy of Paradise"), which is usually attributed to Peter Damien, who was an Italian cardinal of the 11th century, but which may be by his friend and pupil Alberic of Monte Cassino. The hymn is almost entirely accentual, but, apart from certain medieval Latin licences such as long vowels on ānima and frūī it also scans correctly. Unlike Bede, the writer seems to prefer a short syllable at position 2 rather than 6 as Bede recommended. An innovation of this hymn is the assonance (arida, anima, patria at the end of each couplet, which is maintained in the other verses of the hymn (e.g. obnoxiam, gloriam, memoriam and perpetuum, balsamum, aromatum). The third stanza, with a description of the perpetual spring of Paradise, mentioning roses, lilies, and saffron, recalls Tiberinus's poem quoted above.

Ad perennis / vitae fontem //
mens sitivit / arida.
Claustra carnis / praesto frangi //
clausa quaerit / anima.
Gliscit, ambit, / eluctatur //
exul frui / patria.

| – u – – | – – – – ||
| – u – u | – u – |
| – u – – | – – – – ||
| – u – u | – u – |
| – u – – | – – – – ||
| – – – – | – u – |

"For the source of eternal life
the parched soul has grown thirsty.
For the bars of the flesh to be broken open at once
the imprisoned soul seeks.
It yearns, it strives, it struggles
in exile, to enjoy its homeland."

Another well-known hymn in this metre is the following said to have been written by the 12th-century French monk Bernard of Cluny. In this the scansion does not match classical Latin, but the word-accents match the metre. It was set to music by the Polish composer Grzegorz Gerwazy Gorczycki (c. 1667-1734). It begins:

Omni die / dic Mariae //
mea laudes / anima:
ejus festa, / ejus gesta //
cole devo/tissima.

"Every day say praises to Mary,
my soul;
her feasts and her actions
honour most devotedly."

Another late medieval hymn, Pange lingua gloriosi corporis mysterium, is attributed to Thomas Aquinas in the 13th century. It was adapted from, and imitated, Venantius Fortunatus' 6th-century hymn Pange lingua gloriosi proelium certaminis mentioned above.

Pange, lingua, / gloriósi //
Córporis mys/térium,
Sanguinísque / pretiósi, //
Quem in mundi / prétium
Fructus ventris / generósi //
Rex effúdit / géntium.

| – u – u | – u – – ||
| – u – – | – u – |
| – u – u | – u – – ||
| – – – – | – u – |
| – – – – | – u – – ||
| – – – – | – u – |

"Tell, tongue, the mystery
of the glorious Body
and of the precious Blood,
which, for the price of the world,
the fruit of a noble Womb,
the King of the Nations poured forth."

By the 13th century the pronunciation of Latin had changed, and words like prētiōsum, prētium and cibum scan as if they had a long vowel. The trochaic rhythm of first metron of the earlier hymn is not maintained, and the style changes to that of Bede with four long syllables in first and third metron. But the word accents match the metre exactly. Another innovation of this hymn is the ABABAB rhyme, which is absent from earlier hymns.

== Other Medieval Latin poems ==
The trochaic septenarius was also sometimes used in the medieval period for secular writing, such as the Frankish soldier Angelbert's account of the Battle of Fontenoy in 841, which begins:

Aurora cum / primo mane // tetra noctis / dividet,
Sabbati non / illud fuit, // sed Saturni / doleo,
de fraterna / rupta pace // gaudet demon / impius.

Bella! clamant / hinc et inde // pugna gravis / oritur,
frater fratri / mortem parat, // nepoti a/vunculus;
filius nec / patri suo // exhibet quod / meruit.

"When Dawn early in the morning divided the darkness of the night,
That was not the day of the Sabbath, I grieve, but of Saturn;
Over a broken fraternal peace the impious demon rejoices.

"Wars!" they shout, and from here and there a terrible battle arises;
Brother prepares death for brother, uncle for nephew;
Nor does son show his father the duty that he owes."

Apart from Auróra and nepóti, the word accents here follow the metre. However, in some cases, the short vowels of some words such as gravis, parat, nepoti, oritur, meruit would need to be pronounced long to make the poem scan according to classical prosody.

Very similar in metrical style and also from the 9th century is a 375-line poem written by the Italian Johannes Hymonides on the occasion of the coronation of the emperor Charles the Bald in 875. It is a reworking of a 4th-century prose-work called the Cena Cypriani, and begins as follows:

Quidam nomi/ne Iohel rex // Orientis, / maximas
In Chana qui / Galileae // faciebat / nuptias,
invitans ad / cenae plures // dignatus fre/quentiam
qui Iordane / se lavantes // currunt ad con/vivia.

"A certain king of the East named Joel
who was making a wedding in Cana of Galilee,
deigned to invite many guests to join the dinner crowd;
who, after washing themselves in the Jordan, ran to the banquet."

This can be scanned according to traditional metrics only by pronouncing certain short vowels as long (nominē, ōrientis, Gālileae, fāciebat), which might be done more easily if the poem was sung to music. As with Secundinus's Audite omnes amantes, in some words the word accent does not match the metre (e.g. invītans, dignātus); but, as with Secundinus's hymn the 7th and 13th syllables are usually accented. Unlike in that hymn, however, there are no instances of hiatus, except occasionally at the central dieresis.

== Similar metres in other languages ==
=== Persian ===
Classical Persian has a large variety of metres, scanned according to syllable quantity. The following metre, used in several odes by the 14th century poet Hafez, is similar to the trochaic tetrameter catalectic:

sīne mālāmāl-e dard ast; / ey deriqā, marham-ī
del ze tanhā'ī be jān āmad, Xodā-rā, hamdam-ī

| – u – – | – u – – | – u – – | – u – |

"My breast is brimful of pain; alas, a remedy!
My heart is dying of loneliness, for God's sake, (send) a companion!"

The first line above has a break after eight syllables, but in the second, the break is after the 9th syllable.

=== Arabic ===
The Persian metre above is known by the Arabic name ramal (see Arabic prosody), which is the closest Arabic metre. However, the Arabic ramal is usually either a dimeter or a trimeter with this form:

| x u – – | x u – – | x u – (–) | x2

According to Wright, the tetrameter ramal, identical to the Persian metre above with no anceps elements, is a "late innovation". It appears therefore to have been introduced in imitation of Persian poetry rather than being native to Arabic.

=== German ===
Some famous examples of the catalectic trochaic tetrameter are found in German poetry. One is Friedrich Schiller's Ode to Joy, written in 1785, which was set to music by Beethoven in the last movement of his 9th symphony:

Freude, schöner Götterfunken, //
Tochter aus Elysium
Wir betreten feuertrunken, //
Himmlische, dein Heiligtum!

"Joy, lovely spark of the gods,
Daughter from Elysium,
We enter, drunk with fire,
heavenly one, thy sanctuary".

Another poem is the Deutschlandlied, which was written by August Heinrich Hoffmann von Fallersleben in 1841, with the intention that it should be sung to the tune composed by Joseph Haydn in 1797 for an earlier anthem in honour of the Emperor Francis II. The third stanza of this poem was the past German national anthem:

Deutschland, Deutschland über alles //,
Über alles in der Welt,
Wenn es stets zu Schutz und Trutze //
Brüderlich zusammenhält.

"Germany, Germany, above everything,
Above everything in the world,
When we always, for protection and defence,
stand together in a brotherly way".

In both of the above examples, the word stress defines the metre, rather than the lengths of the syllables.

=== Finnish ===
The trochaic septenarius can be found even in the Finnish language, as in the Easter hymn written in 1902 by Leonard Typpö to music by Jonas Andersson, which begins as follows:

Aurinkomme ylösnousi,
paistaa voittovuorella.
Lämmin valo sieltä loistaa,
surut, murheet hajottaa.

"Our sun has risen;
it shines on victory mountain.
A warm light shines from there;
griefs and sorrows dissipate."

=== English poetry ===
An equivalent form is also sometimes found in English verse, as for instance in Tennyson's Locksley Hall, written in 1835.

Comrades, leave me here a little, // while as yet 't is early morn:
Leave me here, and when you want me, // sound upon the bugle-horn.

Another poem in this metre is Maya Angelou's Equality, which was published in 1990 in her collection I Shall Not Be Moved. It begins:

You declare you see me dimly //
through a glass which will not shine,
though I stand before you boldly, //
trim in rank and marking time.

=== English hymns ===
However, mostly commonly the metre is found in hymn-writing. One famous hymn in this metre is John Wesley's Love Divine, first published in 1747:

Love Divine, all Loves excelling, //
Joy of Heaven to Earth come down.
Fix in us thy humble Dwelling,//
All thy faithful Mercies crown;

Another is Glorious Things of Thee Are Spoken, written by John Newton and published in 1779:

Glorious Things of thee are spoken, //
Zion, city of our God.
He, whose word cannot be broken, //
Form'd thee for his own abode.

One of the two tunes used with this hymn is "Austria", written in 1797 by Joseph Haydn, and currently used for the German national anthem (see Deutschlandlied), which is in the same metre.

Another popular hymn is Praise, my soul, the King of heaven, written by Henry Francis Lyte and published in 1834:

Praise, my soul, the King of heaven; //
To His feet thy tribute bring.
Ransomed, healed, restored, forgiven, //
Who like me his praise should sing?
Alleluia, alleluia, //
Praise the everlasting King.

The Christmas carol Once in Royal David's City by Cecil Frances Alexander was published in 1848. It consists of trochaic lines of 8, 7, 8, 7, 7, 7 syllables; so that the first four lines consist of two septenarii:

Once in royal David's city //
Stood a lowly cattle shed,
Where a mother laid her baby //
In a manger for his bed:
Mary was that Mother mild,
Jesus Christ her little Child.

The metre continues to be used for hymns today. A well known example is the Servant Song, which was written in 1977 by Richard Gillard. In this version of the metre, the trochees (– u) have entirely become spondees (– –), set to notes of equal length:

Will you let me be your servant? //
Let me be as Christ to you;
pray that I may have the grace to //
let you be my servant too.

== See also ==
- Metres of Roman comedy
- Prosody (Greek)
- Trochaic tetrameter
- Archilochus
