= Apparebit repentina dies magna Domini =

Medieval Latin hymn on Day of Judgement in trochaic septenarius metre

Apparebit repentina is an anonymous abecedarian Latin hymn on the Day of Judgement. Since it is mentioned by Bede, it is believed to date to the 7th century or earlier.

It was translated into English by John Mason Neale as "That great Day of wrath and terror" in his collection Mediaeval Hymns and Sequences (3rd ed. 1867).

The hymn is composed in an accentual version of the trochaic septenarius metre, and is praised by Bede as a good example of a trochaic hymn in the rhythmic (accentual) style.

In its imagery of the Day of Judgement, the hymn draws mainly on Matthew chapter 25 and on the Book of Revelation.

The text was set for mixed chorus and brass instruments by Paul Hindemith in 1947.

Apparebit repentina dies magna Domini,
fur obscura velut nocte improvisos occupans.
Brevis totus tum parebit prisci luxus saeculi,
totum simul cum clarebit praeterisse saeculum.
Clangor tubae per quaternas terrae plagas concinens,
vivos una mortuosque Christo ciet obviam.
De coelesti judex arce, majestate fulgidus,
claris angelorum choris comitatus aderit.
Erubescet orbis lunae, sol et obscurabitur,
stellae cadent pallescentes, mundi tremet ambitus.
Flamma ignis anteibit justi vultum judicis,
coelos, terras, fluctus maris et profundi devorans.
Gloriosus in sublimi Rex sedebit solio;
angelorum tremebunda circumstabunt agmina.
Huius omnes ad electi colligentur dexteram,
pravi pavent a sinistris, haedi velut foetidi.
Ite, dicit Rex ad dextros, regnum coeli sumite;
Pater vobis quod paravit ante omne saeculum.
Karitate qui fraterna me iuvistis pauperem
caritatis nunc mercedem reportate divites
Laeti dicent: Quando, Christe, pauperem te vidimus
Te, Rex magne, vel egentem miserati iuvimus?
Magnus illis dicet Iudex: cum iuvistis pauperes,
panem, domum, vestem dantes, me iuvistis humiles.
Nec tardabit et sinistris loqui iustus Arbiter
in Gehennae, maledicti, flammas hinc discedite!
Obsecrantem me audire despexistis mendicum
nudo vestem non dedistis, neglexistis languidum.
Peccatores dicent: Christe, quando te vel pauperem,
te, Rex magne, vel infirmum contemnentes sprevimus?
Quibus contra Iudex altus: Mendicanti quamdiu
opem ferre despexistis, me sprevistis improbi.
Retro ruent tum iniusti ignes in perpetuos,
vermis quorum non morietur, flamma nec restinguitur.
Satan atro cum ministris quo tenetur carcere,
fletus ubi mugitusque, strident omnes dentibus.
Tunc fideles ad coelestem sustollentur patriam,
choros inter angelorum regni petent gaudia.
Vrbis summae Hierusalem introibunt gloriam,
vera lucis atque pacis in qua fulget visio
XPM regem iam paterna claritate splendidum
ubi celsa beatorum contemplantur agmina.
Ydri fraudes ergo cave, infirmantes subleva,
aurum temne, fuge luxus, si vis astra petere.
Zona clara castitatis lumbos nunc praecingere,
in occursum magni Regis fer ardentes lampades.

The Great Day of the Lord will suddenly appear
like a thief on a dark night suddenly coming upon the unwary.
Then all the luxury of the previous age will appear short,
and as soon as it gets light a whole age will seem to have passed.
The blast of a trumpet sounding through the four quarters of the earth
will drive the living and dead together to meet Christ.
From the celestial citadel the Judge, shining in majesty,
will come accompanied by brilliant choirs of angels.
The moon's orb will go red and the sun will be darkened,
the stars will fall, growing pale, and the circling of the moon will waver.
A flame of fire will go before the face of the just Judge,
devouring the heavens, the lands, the waves of the sea and of the ocean.
The glorious King will sit on his sublime throne;
trembling hosts of angels will stand around Him.
At His right hand all the chosen will be gathered;
the wicked will tremble on His left, like stinking goats.
Go, says the King to those on the right, take the Kingdom of Heaven;
which the Father prepared for you before every age.
You who with brotherly love helped me when I was poor;
now carry away the reward of your charity and be rich.
The happy ones will say: When, Christ, did we see you poor,
or when, great King, did we have pity when you were in need and helped you?
The great Judge will say to them: When you helped the poor,
giving them bread, a home, clothing, you humbly helped Me.
Nor will the just Judge be slow to speak to those on the left:
Depart from here to Gehenna's flames, cursed ones!
You disdained to hear me when I was a beggar begging you;
you did not give clothing to when I was naked, you neglected me when I was sick.
The sinners will say, Christ, when did we spurn you as a poor man,
Great King, or treat you with contempt when you were sick?
To whom the Supreme Judge will reply: whenever you refused
to give help to a beggar, you wickedly spurned Me.
Then the unjust will fall back into the perpetual fires,
of which the worm will not die, nor the flame be put out.
In the dark prison in which Satan is held with his ministers,
where there is weeping and groaning and all gnash their teeth.
Then the faithful will be lifted up to their heavenly homeland;
amongst choirs of angels they will seek the joys of the Kingdom.
They will enter the glory of the highest city, Jerusalem,
in which shines a true vision of light and peace.
Where the high hosts of the blessed contemplate
Christ the King, now splendid with his Father's brightness.
Therefore, beware of the deceptions of the serpent, raise up the weak,
despise gold, flee luxury, if you wish to seek the stars.
Now gird your loins with the bright belt of chastity;
carry burning lamps to meet the great King.
