= Brevis brevians =

Metrical feature found in Roman comedy

Brevis brevians, also known as iambic shortening or correptio iambica, is a metrical feature of early Latin verse, especially Plautus and Terence, in which a pair of syllables which are theoretically short + long (u –) can be scanned as a pair of short syllables (u u). The plural is breves breviantes.

One common type is where a two-syllable word ends in a vowel which was originally long, for example volo, ibi, ego, nisi and so on. This type is also frequently found in classical Latin.

But brevis brevians also occurs in lines such as the following, in which the closed syllables hoc and om- are shortened, which would never occur in poetry of the classical period:

Quid hoc negōtī (e)st, quod omnēs hominēs fābulantur per viās? (tr7)

"What's this business that all the people are gossiping about in the streets?"

It is thought by many scholars that such shortenings reflect the actual pronunciation of colloquial Latin. Others, however, disagree and consider that the second type, where a closed syllable is shortened, is merely a metrical licence.

Another controversy is whether iambic shortening is caused by word accent. In most (but perhaps not all) cases the shortened syllable is unstressed, and comparison can be made to English words such as monarchy, in which the second syllable is shortened after a stressed short first syllable, compared with heptarchy, in which both the first two syllables are long. Some scholars, however, who believe that the Latin accent was not a stress-accent, disagree with this view and point to some instances in which the shortened syllable appears to be accented.

== Main types ==
The main types of iambic shortening are as follows: (1) commonly used two-syllable words such as ibi, ubi, nisi, quasi, ego, modo, mihi, bene, male in which the final vowel is usually short even in classical Latin; (2) the first two syllables of phrases starting with a two-syllable word such as abī sīs "go, please", volō scīre "I want to know", apud forum "at the forum", recēns nātum "newly born"; (3) the first two syllables of longer words accented on the 3rd syllable, such as voluptātem "pleasure" and senectūte "old age"; (4) the first two syllables of phrases starting from a monosyllable such as quid est quod metuās? "what are you afraid of?", quod ille dīcit "what he is saying", ab exercitū "from the army", tib(i) īrātus "angry with you"; (5) more rarely, and mainly in anapaestic metres, it can occur at the end of words of cretic rhythm (– u –) such as nēminī plūra "to no one more" (this kind is known by some scholars as cretic shortening); (6) rarely it is found across word boundaries, as in ab nēmin(e) accipiēt "he will receive from no one".

Shortening usually takes place in the context of a phrase. Thus the -ī of abī is usually long at the end of a sentence but it is usually shortened in the phrase abi sīs "go, please".

== The name brevis brevians ==
Shortening only takes place after a short syllable, hence the name brevis breviāns, which is short for (syllaba) brevis breviāns (syllabam quae sequitur) "a short syllable which shortens the syllable which follows". The term brevis breviāns dates back to the 19th century, but it does not go back to antiquity, since no ancient grammarian or metrician discusses the phenomenon. The alternative name "iambic shortening" derives from the fact that sequences like volō or quid est are metrically iambs (u –).

== Characteristics ==
The main characteristics of brevis breviāns in Plautus and Terence are the following:

- In Plautus and Terence, the phenomenon is found in iambic, trochaic, and anapaestic verse, but not usually in bacchiac or cretic metres. It is more common in trochaic verse than in iambic, and it is also frequent in anapaestic verse (used by Plautus but not by Terence). In iambic and trochaic verses, instances are found at the beginning of a verse more than elsewhere.
- The syllable preceding the shortened syllable is always short. Thus volō "I want" and rogō "I ask" can be shortened, but crēdō "I believe" and dīcō "I say" cannot be. Words such as videō "I see" and redeō "I return", starting with a pair of short syllables, also cannot be shortened.
- It does not usually occur when a word like abī or volō ends a clause or sentence; in other words, there are usually words or syllables following the shortened syllable, e.g. abĭ sīs, volŏ scīre. However, there are some exceptions to this (see below).
- The shortened syllable is generally unaccented. Usually the word-accent comes either just before the shortened syllable (ábĭ sīs) or immediately after it (volŭptātem). However, there are some apparent exceptions to this (see below).
- In iambic and trochaic metres, the two syllables of the brevis breviāns for the most part are found where an element in the metre has been resolved into two short syllables. Sometimes when a tribrach (u u u) is involved, it apparently occurs split across two elements (see Quis ego sim below); however, this latter kind usually only occurs with words of the type ego, mihi, modo which Questa calls "quasi-pyrrhic".
- Brevis breviāns is optional. The same word or phrase, such as quid est? or voluptātem can often be found in one line with brevis breviāns and in another line without it. Sometimes there are long passages without brevis breviāns, and other passages where it occurs frequently.
- A syllable shortened by brevis breviāns cannot shorten another syllable. For example, in quid est quod metuās, where est is shortened, it is thought that est does not in turn shorten quod. However, this cannot be proved, as the metre will allow either scansion.
- A long vowel at the end of a two-syllable word is often shortened, e.g. ibĭ, egŏ, abĭ, volŏ, cavĕ. Apart from this the great majority of shortenings involve closed syllables, as in quid ĭstuc, volŭptātum and so on.
- A word like patrem or agrum where the medial consonant is a mute + liquid, even though the first syllable is always short in Plautus, almost never undergoes iambic shortening.

== The role of word-accent ==
Scholars often look for an explanation for brevis breviāns in the word-accent of Latin. Thus Wallace Lindsay writes: "The syllable that suffers shortening must be an unaccented syllable (i.e. according to sentence-accentuation). That is a necessary condition." He observes that the accented syllable can come either before or after the shortened syllable. A. M. Devine and Laurence Stephens suggest that both syllables of the iamb must be de-stressed for shortening to take place. In their view: "the shortening rule ... cannot operate if the heavy syllable bears the full word accent, nor if the light syllable retains its full stress".

However, not all scholars agree that iambic shortening is connected with word accent. In particular amongst Italian and French scholars it is a widely held belief that the Latin word accent in Plautus's day was a pitch accent, like that of Ancient Greek, which had no effect on the metre. Thus Cesare Questa, a specialist in the metres of Plautus, who in his earlier works accepted the role of the accent in causing iambic shortening, in his final work in 2007 rejected the idea, on the grounds that it was incompatible with his conviction that the Latin accent was a melodic or musical one.

Another Italian, Marco Fattori, pointing out that in quite a few cases the shortened syllable is apparently accented (for example sed uxōr, sed optumē, ad omnīs rēs), takes the view that "the accent has no role in inducing IS [iambic shortening], regardless of its position." According to his statistics, cases such as sed úxōr where a lexical word is accented on the shortened syllable are just as common as cases such as sed uxōrem where the accent follows the shortened syllable.

In his book Vox Latina, however, W. S. Allen argues that the reduction in length observed in brevis breviāns is itself one of several reasons for thinking that the Latin word-accent was a stress accent unlike that of Greek. According to this view there is no reason to reject the idea that, as in many modern languages, word accent was the cause of the syllable shortenings observed in Latin. In those cases where the shortened syllable appears to be accented, therefore, scholars who believe word accent plays a role look for other explanations, such as positing that the accented syllable loses its stress when the main stress comes on another word in the sentence.

== A metrical licence? ==
Another controversy which has been discussed for over a century is whether brevis breviāns was a real phenomenon of Latin speech, or simply a metrical licence heard in poetry. Lindsay expressed his view as follows: "Brevis Brevians is not a poetic licence, not a Procrustean plan of squeezing a round peg into a square hole, but echoes exactly the pronunciation of everyday (educated) talk".

The American scholar, Fortson, agreeing with Lindsay, writes: "The most likely theory in this writer’s view is that iambic shortening is linguistically real and affected iambic strings that were destressed or whose stress was subordinated to that of surrounding material, whence its most typical appearance in pronouns, particles, sentence adverbs, and strings of clitics."

An alternative view, held by Italian scholars such as Bettini and others, is that final-vowel shortening, as found in words such as ego or ibi and shortening of the vowel before final t and r as in amat or soror, which continued into later Latin, was real, but that the shortening of closed syllables as in quid ergō or voluptatem, which is not found in poetry of the classical period, was a metrical licence, not reflecting the actual speech of Latin speakers. Bettini gives as an example the word cavillātiōnēs, which is shortened because it cannot fit otherwise into an iambic or trochaic verse, while cavillātōr is not shortened.

== Type of words shortened ==
=== Ending in a long vowel ===
One kind of word often involved in brevis breviāns are two-syllable words ending in a vowel, e.g. volō.

In 1890, Leppermann listed all the iambic two-syllable words with a long vowel in the second syllable that occur in Plautus's iambic and trochaic lines, omitting those at the end of a verse. The results of his survey are summarised by Mańczak (1968). From this it would appear that some words were more often shortened than others.

- The most common words are the ones most often shortened. The words egō, mihī, tibī, ubī are the most frequent, and sibī and ibī are also quite common. In all of these the shortened version is much commoner than the unshortened. Leppermann does not include the words nisi, quasi, bene, male, perhaps because the second vowel was nearly always short. All of these words, which Questa calls "quasi-pyrrhics", are also frequently found with a shortened vowel in later Latin. The word modo, when it is an adverb meaning "just now" or "only", was usually shortened, and is counted as a quasi-pyrrhic, but modō (ablative of modus "way") had a long second vowel. This rule also applies in Virgil.
- Common imperatives with a short first vowel are also frequently shortened, for example abī, cavē, vidē, tacē, tenē, rogā, redī, habē, manē.
- The verb forms sciō and volō are often shortened, but dabō rarely, and amō and rogō not at all. Verb forms ending in -ī, such as loquī, are only very rarely shortened.
- The adverbs herī, diū and citō are often shortened in Plautus; but Terence usually has diū, which was the regular form in classical Latin. They are not included among the quasi-pyrrhics by Questa, since they are not used in split-resolution shortening of the type quis ego sim.
- The noun homō is usually not shortened, despite being very common:

homō s(um): hūmānī nīl ā m(ē) aliēnum putō. (ia6)
"I'm a man; I consider nothing human alien from me"

(Possibly here homō is accented on the second syllable, with sum enclitic; in the same way according to Lindsay misér sum appears to have been accented on the second syllable.)

- Nouns with long-vowel case-endings, such as genitive, dative, ablative singular or nominative plural, are very rarely shortened, for example virō, forō, domō, fidē, famē, aquā, manū, marī, erae, malī, patrī, erō, minae, virī.

=== Ending in a consonant ===
- Two-syllable words ending in a short vowel and one or more consonants can also undergo shortening, for example:

enim, apud (both very frequent), simul, bonum, dabit, senex, pater, patrem, adest, potest.

- Words ending in -is or -us in Plautus's day usually had a weak or silent -s, which did not count in the scansion except by preventing elision before a vowel. So words like magis, satis, potis, nimis, prius, Iovis usually have a short second syllable, and spellings such as mage and pote are also found. This dropping of -s before a consonant appears to have been the rule rather than the exception in Plautus's Latin.
- Iambic nouns and verbs ending in -r and -t such as habēt, erāt, sorōr had a long vowel in Plautus's time. There is a difference, however, between Plautus and Terence. In the majority of instances Plautus shows a long vowel in nouns such as amōr, sorōr, whereas in Terence there are no sure examples. Similarly with 3rd singular verbs in -t such as amāt, erāt, habēt, abīt in Plautus about 70% have the long vowel, but in Terence there are no sure instances with a long vowel.
- By contrast, 2nd person verbs ending in -s such as negās, iubēs, habēs, abīs are only very rarely shortened in Plautus (in 4% of cases), and never shortened in Terence. Nouns ending in -s such as forēs, pedēs, virōs, salūs, ovēs also usually remain unshortened in both authors.

=== Words with synizesis ===
Words with two vowels in hiatus, such as deōs, eōs, meō, duās, suōs, tuōs, suās, suō are relatively often shortened compared with similar words with a medial consonant, such as virōs, forō, domō, aquā and so on. It is thought that the reason for this is that the two vowels tended to merge into a single syllable by synizesis, rather than making a brevis breviāns with two separate short syllables.

Similarly the words eorum, earum, eum, eam, eodem, eaedem, duorum, duobus, eamus and so on are thought usually to have had synizesis of the first two vowels. Eosdem and eodem with synizesis are used even in dactylic verse by Propertius and Lucilius. But Lindsay believes that the 1st person eō "I am going" was a dissyllable. It seems that the single-syllable form of such words was used when they were unemphatic.

Since the word novus is frequently subject to shortening in Plautus, it is likely that it too, as well as words such as bovēs, underwent the same process.

Synizesis is also thought to have occurred between words. For example, in the following line, where suō hos- makes up a single element in the metre, Questa suggests that rather than brevis breviāns the syllables merged into something like /swos-/:

itaqu(e) ill(ī) amantī su(ō) hospitī mōrem gerit (ia6)

"and so he is humouring that lover, his guest"

It is unclear whether the following is also an instance of synizesis or whether, as Questa scans it, it has brevis breviāns:

omni(a) omnēs ubi rescīscunt (starts ia8)
omni(a) omnēs ubi rescīscunt

"when they all find out everything"

== Authors who used brevis brevians ==
Brevis breviāns was associated particularly with conversational styles, especially the more lively speech of the trochaic verses of Roman comedy. It is thus often found in Plautus, Terence, and in the fragments of Caecilius (early 2nd century BC), Afranius, a comic dramatist of about 100 BC, and in the farces of Lucius Pomponius of about 90 BC. However, it is generally not used in cretic and bacchiac metres even in Plautus.

In the elevated style of Ennius's Annals, written in dactylic hexameters, brevis breviāns hardly appears, apart from quasi, ubi, tibi, sibi (alongside unshortened ubī, tibī, sibī, and always ibī). However, there are two examples in the 11-line fragment of Ennius's hexameter work on gourmet eating, Hedyphagetica: apud Cūmās "at Cumae" and quid scarum praeteriī "why have I omitted the parrot-wrasse?" (a kind of fish). There are also five or six examples in the fragments of Ennius's tragedies, such as in this trochaic septenarius from his Alexander:

adest adest fax obvolūta sanguin(e) atqu(e) incendiō.

"It is here, it is here, the torch wrapped in blood and fire!"

A few other examples are found in fragments of tragedies of Pacuvius and Lucius Accius, and one or two also (such as apud sē) in the satires of Lucilius, both trochaic and dactylic.

In classical Latin poetry, apart from viden? "do you see?", mentioned above, iambic shortening is only found in words ending in a vowel. Thus enim and apud are never shortened in Virgil or Ovid. The quasi-pyrrhic words such as bene, male, ibi, ubi, nisi, modo, ego, mihi, tibi, sibi, duo are regularly used in their shortened form. The word cave "do not" is shortened in both Catullus and Ovid and ave 'hail, hello' in Ovid. (According to Quintilian, avĕ with short -e was the usual pronunciation in his day, the long form being used only by pedantic people.) Short vowels also occur at the end of the first element of compound verb formations like calefaciō.

Apart from these, the final vowel -ō is most subject to shortening, especially in 1st person verbs. The verb sciŏ occurs in Virgil, and volŏ in Propertius. The verbs nego, amo, dabo, peto, cano, ero, scio and puto are all sometimes found in shortened form in Ovid. In Ovid it seems that such shortened words are often found after a (non-lexical) monosyllabic word, e.g. tē peto, nec peto, et dabo, nōn ero, tunc amo, at puto, quod scio. The word citō "quickly" is also sometimes shortened in Ovid (e.g. quam cito). But utī (= ut) and diū are not shortened.

There are also occasional examples of cretic shortening of words in -o, such as nescio (Catullus), dīxero (Horace), dēsino (Tibullus), Scīpio (Ovid). Expressions of the type nescio quis "someone" with short -o are found in Catullus and Virgil and are very frequent in Ovid.

By the time of Martial, shortening of final -ō is found even in some non-iambic words such as virgo, ergo, quando, nēmo and in verbs such as mālo, nōlo, quaero, crēdo. The words nēmŏ and Sulmŏ are shortened even in Ovid.

== Brevis brevians and metre ==
Brevis breviāns is not particularly common in iambic metres, but more common in the more lively trochaic, and very common in anapaestic metres. However, it is almost never used in bacchiac and cretic metres.

In the iambic senarius, brevis breviāns is most commonly found at the beginning of the verse.

=== Iambo-trochaic metres ===
The two most common metres used in Roman comedy are the iambic senarius:

| x – x – | x – x – | x – u – | ia6

and the trochaic septenarius:

| – x – x | – x – x || – x – x | – u – | tr7

As can be seen, both metres consist of a succession of long elements (–) alternating with anceps elements (x), which can be long or short. Any long or anceps element, except at the line end or before the mid-point of a trochaic septenarius, can be resolved into two short syllables.

Brevis breviāns is usually found where an element, either long or anceps, has been resolved. Thus a trochaic septenarius may begin in either of the following ways:

volŏ scīr(e) ergō (with volŏ in a long element)

"so I want to know..."

sed volŏ scīre (with volŏ in an anceps)

"but I want to know..."

Resolution, and hence also brevis breviāns, is more common in some parts of the line than others. For example, in an iambic senarius, the first element (an anceps) is resolved in 27% of verses, but the 5th element in only 4%. Correspondingly brevis breviāns is also commonly found in the 1st element of a senarius, rarely in the 5th.

Very rarely brevis breviāns can also be found split between two elements where the sequence – x has been resolved into a tribrach (u u u), for example quis ego sim. However, this occurs mainly or exclusively with a small set of words of a kind labelled by Questa "quasi-pyrrhic" which are most frequently found in their shortened form. For further details see Quis ego sim below.

In iambic and trochaic verse, anceps elements are usually unaccented. It is thus more common for a phrase such as apud fórum where the first word is unaccented to occur with the brevis breviāns in an anceps position; whereas a phrase like quid est quod metuās where the 1st and 4th syllables are accented always has the brevis breviāns in a long element.

=== Anapaestic metres ===
In anapaestic metre, which is only found in Plautus, not in Terence, the basic metron is u u – u u –. It appears to have been a very lively metre, and instances of brevis breviāns are very common. The brevis breviāns may occupy either the two short syllables of the pattern or a resolved long element. In anapaests also it is not uncommon for cretic words such as nēminī to be shortened to dactyls, which is very rare in iambo-trochaics. Anapaests were sung to music, and the characters often express strong emotion, as in this passage from Plautus's Cistellaria:

ferŏr differŏr distrahŏr diripior,
ita nūbilăm ment(em) anim(ī) habeō.
ubĭ s(um), ibĭ nōn s(um), ubĭ nōn s(um), ibĭst animus,
ita m(i) omnia sunt ingenia;
quod lubĕt, non lubĕt i(am) id continuō,
ita m(ē) Amŏr lass(um) animī lūdificat

| uu – uu – | uu – uu – |
| uu – uu – | uu uu – |
| uu uu – uu | – uu uu – |
| uu – uu – | – uu – |
| – uu – uu | – – uu – |
| uu uu – uu | – – uu – |

"I am being carried, I am being taken apart, I am being pulled apart, I am being torn apart;
I have such a troubled mind!
Where I am, I'm not there, where I'm not, my mind is there;
I have so many moods!
What I want, I immediately don't want any more;
Love is playing so much with my mind!"

=== Reizianus and Wilamowitzianus ===
The Reizianus and Wilamowitzianus also have frequent brevis breviāns. Examples in the versus Reizianus, for example, are:

tenĕ tenē (reiz)

"hold, hold!"

plūs libĕns faxim (reiz)

"I would more willingly do it"

pol etsī taceās (reiz)

"by God, even if you keep quiet"

While from the Wilamowitzianus come examples such as:

nōn tacĕs, īnsipiēns? (wil)

"won't you keep quiet, you fool?"

tib(i) ĭrātus (wil)

"angry with you"

=== Cretic and bacchiac metres ===
The cretic metre has a pattern – x – – u –, while the bacchiac has x – – x – –. In these metres there is usually no iambic shortening, and words like sciō, voluptātum, sorōr and so on are used in their unshortened form.

Thus in the following cretic line volō has its unshortened form, and perditus also is not shortened to perditu':

hoc volō scīre tē: / perditus sum miser
| – u – | – u – || – u – | – u – |
"I want you to know this: I am ruined! wretched me!"

Two reasons have been suggested for the lack of brevis brevians in cretic and bacchiac metres. According to Lindsay, the bacchiac metre often has a tone of seriousness (gravitās) and he believed that it is for this reason brevis breviāns is avoided. An example of bacchiac metre is the speech of the old lady in Plautus's Aulularia, who addresses her brother as follows, using the archaic -āī genitive:

velim t(e) arbitrārī / mēd haec verba, frāter
meāī fidēī / tuāīque rēī
causā facer(e), ut aequom (e)st / germānam sorōrem.
"I would like you to believe, brother, that I am speaking these words
because of my loyalty and of your interest,
as it befits your own sister to do."

Bettini has a different explanation. He argues that to introduce shortened syllables (e.g. velǐm in the example above) would create ambiguity and obscure the basic u – – rhythm characteristic of the metre. This ambiguity never arises in the anapaestic metres, however, where brevis breviāns is common. The same wish to avoid ambiguity, according to Bettini, explains the avoidance of double iamb endings such as tacē modo at the end of a senarius, which could potentially be interpreted either as 3 elements or 4.

== End of sentence ==
=== Usual rule ===
With a few exceptions, brevis breviāns does not end a clause or sentence. So in the phrase volo scīre "I want to know", which occurs several times in Plautus, volō is always shortened, except once in cretic metre, but at the end of a sentence the long form is usually used, as in the following sentence:

Alcumēn(a), ūnum rogāre tē volō. – quid vīs rogā. (tr7)

"Alcmene, there's one thing I want to ask you." – "Ask what you want."

Similarly, in the phrase abi sīs "go please" or abi iam "go now", abī is shortened, but at the end of a sentence, abī takes on its unshortened form, e.g.

tac(ē) atqu(e) abī (tr7)

"be quiet and go!"

A parallel in English for abī vs abi sīs might be follow vs follow them, where the second syllable of follow is shortened when non-final.

=== Exceptions ===
Although a brevis breviāns does not usually end a clause or sentence, yet there are some exceptions, such as viden? (short for vidēsne? "do you see?" or "do you get me?"):

mē viden? – tē videō (ends ia7)

"do you get me?" – "I get you"

viden? scelestus aucupātur (starts tr7)

"do you see? The crook is on the hunt"

The word scio "I know" is also found with shortened final vowel when used as a sentence adverb:

sciǒ, captiōnēs metuis (starts ia6)

"I know, you're afraid of a trap"

pauc(a) effugiam, sciǒ; nam mult(a) ēvenient, et meritō meō (tr7)

"I shall escape few things, I know; for many things will happen, and I deserve them"

Both vidĕn and sciŏ are found with a short final syllable in Catullus and Virgil, so they appear to have been a regular part of the Latin language.

There are other exceptions such as the following, where the verbs are possibly linked into a single accentual group:

rogŏ, negāt vīdisse (starts tr7)

"when I asked, he said he hadn't seen you"

amăt, dabitur ā m(ē) argentum (starts ia6)

"if he's in love, money will be given by me"

Sometimes other exceptions are found. In this example from Plautus, the word voluptātem is not shortened, but volō is shortened even though it comes at the end of a sentence and before a change of speaker:

Mīlitem lepid(ē), et facēt(ē) et lautē lūdificārier
volŏ. – Voluptātem mecastor m(ī) imperās. (tr7)

"I want the soldier to be charmingly, wittily, and splendidly tricked."
"By God, what you are ordering me to do will be a pleasure!"

Similarly quid est? is shortened before a change of speaker in Terence's Adelphoe 261 and 281:

quid est? – quid sīt? (opens ia8)

"What's the matter?" – "What's the matter, do you ask?"

== Examples of brevis brevians ==
It has been argued that word accent may have influenced the shortening of syllables by brevis brevians. Since in iambic and trochaic verse the word accent often tends to coincide with the long elements of the metres (the so-called "ictus"), in the list of examples below, the long elements have been marked in bold and the examples are grouped according as to whether they occur in a long element or in an anceps.

=== In an anceps ===
When an example of brevis breviāns occurs in an anceps element, it is usually followed by a word-accent, as in most of the examples below.

==== Dabit nēmō ====
A brevis breviāns is frequently found in the opening of an iambic line, as in most of the following examples. Usually the shortened syllable is a closed syllable containing a short vowel:

dabit nēmō (starts ia8)

"there's no one who will give"

patĕr vēnit (starts ia6)

"Father has come"

sciăs posse (starts ia6)

"you should know it's possible"

iubĕt frāter? (starts ia6)

"it is ordered by my brother?"

potest fierī (starts ia6)

"it can be done"

vidĕtqu(e) ipse (starts ia6)

"and he himself sees"

recĕns nātum (starts ia6)

"newly born"

ego vērō iubeō (starts ia6)

"I am indeed ordering it"

In other positions in iambic lines:

apud iūdicem (ends ia6)

"in front of a judge"

amă quid lubēt (ends ia6)

"love whatever you like"

verbum cavĕ faxis (2nd anceps, ia7)

"don't say a word"

==== Quid hoc autem? ====
BB can also occur in a phrase starting with a monosyllable in the same positions:

quid hoc autem (starts ia7)

"but what's this?" (hoc was usually pronounced hocc)

quid istuc est? (starts ia6)

"what is that?" (istuc may have been pronounced /istúcc/)

et abdūcer(e) (starts ia6)

"and to take away"

it(a) attentē (starts ia6)

"so attentively"

in occultō miserī (starts ia6)

"in secret, poor things"

bon(um) ingenium (starts ia6)

"a good character"

per annōnam cāram (starts ia6)

"at a time of high prices"

sed ecc(um) ipsum (starts ia6)

"but here he is himself"

et inter nōs (starts ia7)

"and between ourselves"

vel hic Pamphilus (starts ia6)

"even this Pamphilus"

et uxōrem suam rūr(i) ess(e) aiēbāt (starts ia6)

"and he was saying his wife was in the farm"

In other positions of iambic lines:

mĕ exspectēs (in ia6)

"you should wait for me"

eg(o) hās semper fūgī nūptiās (end of ia6)

"I always fled from this marriage"

mod(o) ē Dāvō (in ia7)

"just now from Davus"

ab exercitū (ends ia6)

"from the army"

==== Sed volo scīre ====
Another place where a brevis breviāns is commonly found in an anceps position is in a trochaic line, especially in the first foot after a monosyllable:

sed volo scīre (starts tr7)

"but I want to know"

quid, domum vostram? (starts tr7)

"what, your house?"

nōs for(e) invītō (starts tr7)

"that we are going to be, against his will, ..."

sed quid illuc est (starts tr7)

"but what's that?"

hīnc enim mihi (starts tr7)

"for from here for me"

sed quis istuc tibi (ends tr7)

"but who (said) that to you?"

==== Voluptātem ====
Of similar accentuation are four-syllable words accented on the 3rd syllable. In these polysyllabic words, in most cases the shortened second syllable is also closed. These four-syllable words can start an iambic line:

voluptāte, vīn(ō) et amōre dēlēctāverō (starts ia6)

"I shall enjoy myself with pleasure, wine, and love"

voluptāt(em) inesse tantam (starts ia6)

"that there is so much pleasure in it"

iuventūte (starts ia6)

"from young men"

dedistīn argentum? (starts ia6)

"did you pay the money?"

But words of this kind can also be placed immediately before the caesura of a senarius:

quīn sī voluntāte nōlet (2nd anceps, ia6)

"if he doesn't want to do it voluntarily"

hārunc voluptātum (2nd anceps, ia6)

"of these pleasures"

suae senectūtī (2nd anceps, ia6)

"for his old age"

qu(ae) hīc administrāret (2nd anceps, ia6)

"who would administer here"

ubi sint magistrātūs (2nd anceps, ia6)

"where the magistrates are"

Sometimes words of this kind are also found without brevis breviāns. They can also sometimes be found with the brevis breviāns in a long element, e.g.:

voluptāti (e)st mihi (end of tr7)

"it's a pleasure for me"

However, as Sturtevant showed, in words of shape u u – – it is more common for the long element to coincide with the penultimate syllable than with the first.

==== Amicitiam ====
Occasionally a long vowel in a four-syllable word is shortened. However, this is very rare compared with cases like voluptātem where the shortened syllable is closed. Usually, in a word like amīcitia the long vowel is retained, while the shortened form occurs only once:

amicitiam (1st anceps, tr7)

"friendship"

pudicitiam (starts ia6)

"modesty"

Syracūsās (2nd anceps, ia6)

"Syracuse"

verebāminī? (ends ia6)

"were you afraid?" (but some manuscripts have verēminī)

However, the long vowels of verbs compounded with faciō or fīō are regularly shortened, possibly because these compounds were accented as if they were two separate words:

permadefēcit (in ia8)

"it completely melted"

calefierī iussī (ends tr7)

"I gave an order for them to be heated up"

==== Dedi mercātōrī ====
In the following cases, the syllable which follows the brevis brevians is unaccented. However, it is thought that in a word like mercātōrī the first syllable had a secondary accent:

dedĭ mercātōrī (starts ia6)

"I gave it to a merchant"

ovem lupŏ commīsistī (3rd anceps, ia6)

"you entrusted a sheep to a wolf"

sed forĕs concrepuērunt nostrae (starts tr7)

"but our doors have made a noise"

And in a fragment of one of Ennius's tragedies:

multīs sum modǐs circumventus (2nd anceps, tr7)

"I am surrounded in many ways"

==== Per oppressiōnem ====
The following are similar, but there is no accent on the first syllable of the brevis breviāns. The shortened syllable is a closed one:

per oppressiōnem (starts ia6)

"through force"

et in dēterrendō (starts ia6)

"and in deterring"

at indīligenter (starts ia6)

"but carelessly"

cavillātiōnēs (starts ia6)

"jokes"

==== Sed uxōr scelesta ====
This type presents potential difficulties for those who believe that the shortened syllable must be unstressed, since úxōr, ómnēs, íllīs, ístam and so on are usually stressed on their first syllable. The usual explanation for instances of this type is to assume that these words are subordinated accentually to a word later in the sentence, and are thus deaccented.

This concept is familiar from English; for example, the word already is accented in he's done it alreády but loses its accent before dóne in he's already dóne it. According to this argument, in quid illīs futūrum (e)st cēterīs? "what's going to happen to those others?" the focus would be on cēterīs in much the same way as in the English question the focus is on the word others.

Fattori, however, disagrees, and argues that the shortened syllable is actually accented. He cites examples where the shortened syllable appears to be focussed and therefore emphatic (see further below).

sed uxōr scelesta m(ē) omnibus servāt modīs (starts ia6)

"but my wretched wife watches me in every way"

quid illīs futūrum (e)st cēterīs? (starts ia7)

"what's going to happen to those others?"

et illud mī vitiumst maxumum (starts ia6)

"and that is a very great vice of mine"

pol istam rem vōbīs ben(e) ēvēnisse gaudeō (starts ia6)

"by Pollux, I'm glad that thing turned out well for you"

quod illī maledictum vēmēns esse exīstumant (starts ia6)

"which they believe is a strong criticism"

it(a) omnīs dē tēctō dēturbāvit tēgulās (starts ia6)

"so much did it knock down all the tiles from the roof"

The following are found in trochaic metre:

nōn eg(o) illam mancupi(ō) accēpī (starts tr7)

"I did not buy her officially"

atqu(e) ad illum renūntiārī (starts tr7)

"and for a message to be sent to him"

qui(a) illō di(ē) inprānsus fuī (ends tr7)

"because on that day I hadn't had breakfast"

lepidiōr(em) ad omnīs rēs nec quī... (tr7)

"more charming in every way and who isn't... "

And in a long element:

eg(o) ill(um) ant(e) aedīs praestolābor (starts tr7)

"I'll wait for him in front of the house"

==== Nēmini plūra ====
Shortening of the last syllable of words of cretic rhythm (– u –), such as nēminī to make a dactyl (– u u) is known as "cretic shortening". It is rare in Plautus and Terence's iambo-trochaic lines, but common in anapaests. The reason for this is that in general, by a rule called the Hermann-Lachman law (see Metres of Roman comedy#Hermann-Lachman law), the poets generally avoided using dactylic words, such as dīcere, or omnibus + vowel, in iambic and trochaic verse. However, in the first foot of a verse this rule was applied less strictly:

nēminǐ plūra (starts tr7)

"to no one more things"

qu(em) aequiŭst nōs (starts tr7)

"whom is it fairer for us..."

omniŭm m(ē) exīl(em) atqu(e) inānem (starts tr7)

"(has made) me devoid and empty of all..."

Words with cretic shortening could freely be used in anapaestic verse, as in the following:

differŏr distrahŏr (an)

"I am being pulled apart, I am being torn apart"

nūbilăm mentem (an)

"a cloudy mind"

An exception to the rule that cretic shortening does not usually occur in iambic or trochaic metre is the word nescio, which is regularly shortened in expressions such as nescio quis, nescio quid:

nesciŏ quis praestīgiātōr (starts tr7)

"some imposter or other"

Nescio quid is also found with a short -o even in Virgil, so the pronunciation with a short -o seems to have been regular in Latin.

The expression nescio quid is also found with scio in a long element, and also, when it means "I don't know what", in an unshortened form.

==== Mātris imperium ====
In another group the brevis brevians begins from the last syllable of a two-syllable word. However, this is very rare in iambic and trochaic verse. The first four are found in the 2nd element of the line, where metrical license is more common. Some of these examples are dubious and have been questioned by editors.

illic hīnc abiīt (starts tr7)

"he has gone"

trīstis incēdit (starts tr7)

"he's walking sadly"

aufer istaec (starts tr7)

"take away those things"

indid(em) und(e) oritur (starts tr7)

"from this same place from where it arises"

mātris imperium (starts 2nd half tr7)

"a mother's rule"

dīce dēmōnstrā (starts 2nd half of tr7)

"say, show me"

inter istās versārier (end of ia8)

"to mix with girls of that sort"

ecquis hoc aperīt ōstium? (but Questa prefers ĕquis hoc...) (ends ia6/tr7)

"is anyone opening this door?"

Such scansions are also found in anapaests:

ab nēmin(e) accipiēt (an)

"he will receive from nobody"

A very similar example to inter istas above is the following; but here the brevis breviāns is in a long element:

inter ĭllud tamen negōtium (starts ia7)

"in the midst of that business, however"

==== Quis ego sim ====
Similar in rhythm to the above group are the following, in which a long + anceps (– x) is replaced by a tribrach split after the first syllable (u, u u). This is evidently allowable when iambic shortening is not involved (e.g. ub(i) era pepererit); but can brevis breviāns also occur in this situation (e.g. ub(i) erit puerō), or is the scansion u, u – preferable?

According to Questa, in such situations if a shortened word is used it is always one of the very common "quasi-pyrrhic" words such as bene, male, nisi, quasi, ego, mihi, tibi, ibi, ubi etc. of which the shortened form was already well-established in Plautus's day and continued to be used in classical times. He reports that other words such as cito, heri, diu cannot be used in this way.

In the first six examples below except the shortening occurs in a position in the verse where a short syllable is usually required:

quis ego sim (4th anceps, ia7)

"who I am"

quod apud vōs (4th anceps, ia7)

"what was with you"

sed ubinam (4th anceps, ia7)

"but where on earth"

et ego vōs (ends tr7)

"and I you"

veluti mī (vel uti mī) (ends ia6)

"as if for me..."

at enĭm tū (starts cr2)

"but you"

In other places in the line, the scansion is ambiguous, and it is not clear if the shortened form is intended or not:

is ibi mortuost (starts tr7)

"he died there"

eg(o) enim dīcam (starts tr7)

"for I will tell you"

==== Aliqua tibi spēs ====
The following are very similar to the above, but are not preceded by a monosyllable. Again, the metre is ambiguous as to whether the shortened form is intended; however, Lindsay argues that the first at least has brevis breviāns, since apud is always shortened before a noun.

Long elements split in this way starting from the end of a non-monosyllabic word are not uncommon. Except in the first foot (nūllá mihi rēs) they are always preceded by a short syllable. (This does not apply when the sequence starts with a monosyllabic word: nōn scīs quis ego sim?.) In most cases where there is no iambic shortening a sequence – x with split long is realised as a tribrach (u, u u) not an anapaest (u, u –).

From Plautus:

aliqua tibi spēs (4th anceps, ia7)

"some hope for you"

quō modo tibi rēs (5th anceps, ia6)

"how the matter ... for you"

hīc in aedibus ubi t(u) habitās (in tr7)

"here in the house where you live"

"mea rosa" mihi dīcitō (ends tr7)

"say 'my darling' to me"

From Terence:

nūlla mihi rēs, (starts ia7)

"for me nothing"

facilius ego quod volō (ends ia6)

"I will more easily (achieve) what I want"

omnia sibi post putāvit (in ia8)

"he considered nothing was more important"

cōnscia mihi sum (in ia8)

"I am conscious that I..."

The above examples use quasi-pyrrhic words (words whose double-short pronunciation was the usual one and which continued to be short in classical Latin). Examples like the following are more controversial, since according to Questa and others, only pyrrhic words and quasi-pyrrhics can be split between elements in this way:

From Plautus:

rēs agitur apŭd iūdicem (ends tr7)

"a case is being heard in front of a judge"

dīc igitur, ub(i) illa (e)st? (2nd anceps, tr7)

"say, therefore, where is she?"

From Terence:

accipit homo nēmō melius (2nd anceps, tr7)

"no man entertains better" (scansion uncertain)

mihi s(ī) umquam fīlius erit, n(ae) ille facilī m(ē) ūtētur patre. (ia8)

"if ever I have a son, he will certainly find me to be an indulgent father"

Raffaelli (1978), examining all the cases of the kind fīlius erit in Terence's iambic octonarii, tentatively suggested that brevis breviāns might be found here even though the word erit is not quasi-pyrrhic. It seems that when a long element is split in this way, which is more frequent in Terence than in Plautus, the succeeding anceps is always either a short syllable, or potentially short by iambic shortening, never a double short.

Other possibilities have been suggested. One is that simply there is no shortening here. It is generally thought, however, that in the case of apud iūdicem at least there is likely to be shortening, since apud is usually shortened before a noun.

Another possibility in the first two is that there is a locus Jacobsohnianus (see Metres of Roman comedy#Locus Jacobsohnianus), that is to say, that the syllable -tur counts as long, and apud, so that apud and ub(i) il- are wholly in the following element. But locus Jacobsohnianus is not thought to be found in Terence, and in any case cannot apply to fīlius, since it does not end a metron.

The French scholar Louis Havet believed that in all these cases where a final short syllable coincides with a long element, the final syllable functioned as long; in other words the sequence u, uu is equivalent to – uu.

==== Molestae sunt ====
The following are surprising since they seem to be accented on the shortened syllable:

molestae sunt (starts ia6)

"they are a nuisance"

scelest(ae) hae sunt aedēs (Lindsay reads scelestae sunt) (starts ia6)

"this house is sinful"

To explain these and other examples like them, scholars have suggested that it is possible that the accentuation was different from the normal penultimate rule; for example, it is possible that the accent shifted rightwards in molestaé sunt. In the same way the phrase misér sum "I am wretched" (never míser sum) seems to have been accented (according to Lindsay) in all six occurrences in Plautus on the second syllable with sum enclitic.

The phrase voluptās mea occurs ten times in Plautus, always at the end of a trochaic or iambic line, for example:

sed, voluptās mea (ends tr7)

"but, my darling"

One explanation is that the phrase was accented as a single word, with the accent on -tās. However, this is not certain.

=== In a long element ===
==== Modo mē pugnīs ====
When a brevis breviāns occupies a long element in the metre, a common pattern is a kind where the accent falls on the 1st and 4th syllables of the sequence u u x – x. This kind of brevis breviāns always occurs in a long element, conforming to the metrical ictus. The syllable immediately following the shortened syllable is accentless. This type is typically found in trochaic metre, as in the following line, in which it occurs twice:

Quid hoc negōtī (e)st, quod omnēs hominēs fābulantur per viās? (tr7)

"What's this business that all the people are gossiping about in the streets?"

In the great majority of cases, the shortened syllable is a closed syllable containing a short vowel.

In the following examples of this pattern, the syllable following the brevis breviāns is long:

simul cum nūntiō (2nd long, tr7)

"along with the messenger"

erit praesidium (tr7)

"there will be a protection"

scio quid fēcerīs (ends tr7)

"I know what you did"

avēs adsuēscunt (starts tr7)

"the birds grow accustomed to it"

habe bon(um) animum (starts tr7)

"cheer up"

viden vestibulum? (starts tr7)

"do you see the entrance-hall?"

modo mē pugnīs (tr7)

"me, just now with his fists"

enim vēr(o) illud praeter alia (starts tr7)

"indeed, that more than other things"

opust lign(ō), opust carbōnibus (2nd half, tr7)

"there is need for firewood and charcoal"

The phrase enim vērō can also occur in an anceps (see above).

In iambic lines the pattern is less common:

apud praetōrem dīcam (ia6)

"I will say it in front of the praetor"

voluptāt(um) omnium (ends ia8)

"of every pleasure"

==== Quid est quod metuās ====
Other examples with similar rhythm start from a monosyllable. Several examples in this group involve the shortening of est or the demonstratives ille, iste, hic and is:

quid est quod metuās? (starts tr7)

"what are you afraid of?"

quid est quod vōbīs (tr7)

"what is that ...to you"

quid id tū quaeris? (tr7)

"why are you asking that?"

quid hoc sīt hominis (starts tr7)

"what sort of man would this be?"

is est immūnis (starts tr7)

"he's exempt"

quod est prōmissum (tr7)

"what was promised"

id ess(e) absūmptum (5th long, tr7)

"that it was used up"

quod accēpistī (tr7)

"which you received"

quod omnēs hominēs (in tr7)

"which all the people"

eg(o) obsōnābō (starts tr7)

"I'll go and buy some food"

nequ(e) istam vīdī (tr7)

"nor did I even see her" (emphasis on vīdī)

et illam simul cum nūntiō (starts tr7)

"and that she, along with the messenger..."

eg(o) illam reperiam (starts tr7)

"I'll find her"

tib(i) istuc facinus (in tr7)

"to you, that deed"

quod ille dīcit (in tr7)

"what he is saying"

In iambics:

ben(e) ĕvēnisse gaudeō (in ia6)

"I'm glad it turned out well"

in istōc portūst (1st long, ia6)

"it's in that port"

nam quod istī dīcunt malevolī (1st long, ia6)

"for what those malevolent people are saying"

sed quid hoc clāmōris (1st long, ia6)

"but what's this shouting...?"

quis haec est quae... (3rd long, ia6)

"who is this girl who..."

Lindsay reads the following as two short syllables rather than one long syllable by synizesis:

dĕ illā pugnā (2nd long, ia6)

"about that battle"

cŭm ĭllā fābulābor (2nd long, ia6)

"I will chat with her"

==== Mane man(e) audī ====
The examples below are similar, but the pattern u u u – starts with a two-syllable word:

scio quid errēs (starts tr7)

"I know why you are making a mistake"

bonum sodālem (starts tr7)

"a good friend"

vēra volo loquī tē (3rd long, tr7)

"I want you to tell the truth"

mane man(ē) audī! (starts tr7)

"wait, wait, listen!"

mane man(e) obsecrō tē (tr7)

"wait, wait, I beg you"

This pattern is less common in iambic lines:

adest benignitās (ends ia6)

"there is good will"

==== Quid abstulistī ====
The examples below also have a pattern u u u – but starting from a monosyllable. Devine and Stephens note that even though abstulistī probably had a secondary stress on the first syllable, this did not prevent brevis breviāns. They conclude that in such cases both the first and the second syllable of the brevis breviāns group were de-stressed:

quid abstulist(ī) hīnc (starts tr7)

"what did you take away from here?"

id esse facinus (starts tr7)

"that this deed..."

quid esse dīcis (5th long, tr7)

"what do you say is..."

quod ille dīcit (2nd long, tr7)

"what he says"

eg(o) ille doctus lēnō (2nd long, tr7)

"I that experienced panderer"

sed estne frātēr intus? (starts tr7)

"but is my brother inside?"

sed hic quis est senex (starts tr7)

"but who is this old man?"

In the following it is possible that the accent moved to -crās; otherwise the shortening is puzzling:

quid opsecrās mē? (in tr7)

"why are you begging me?"

Similar is the following (which is thought to be an interpolation by some editors), in which op- similarly appears to be accented:

nam quoivīs hominī vel optumō vel pessumō (ia6)

"for to any man, whether the best or worst"

Latin spellings such as ascendo (for ad-scendō) and asporto) (for abs-portō) may give a clue as to how phrases such as quid abstulistī were actually pronounced when spoken rapidly.

==== Nēminem venīre ====
In the following the shortened syllable comes at the end of a cretic word (– u –) and is followed by an unaccented syllable. They come in the first foot of an iambic line, where metrical licence is sometimes found:

nēminĕm venīre (starts ia6)

"that no one was coming"

alterŭm quadrīmum puerum (starts ia6) (or alt'rum?)

"the other a boy of four"

dēcidŏ dē lectō (starts ia4)

"I fall off the couch"

But nescio quid "something" and similar expressions can occur in other places in the line:

malī nescio quid nūntiāt (2nd foot, ia8)

"he's bringing bad news"

There is also a series of examples where the brevis breviāns starts from quidem. Since quidem is thought to have been enclitic, the accentuation of dum quidem was presumably similar to that of nēminem. Again the examples begin an iambic line:

ut quid(em) ille dīxit (starts ia6)

"as indeed he said"

dum quid(em) hercle tēcum nūpta sīt (starts ia6)

"provided by Hercules that she is married to you"

The rhythm of these is similar to iambic lines beginning turbida tempestās, piscibus in altō and so on which have no brevis breviāns.

==== Dedisse dono ====
There are a number of instances of individual words in which the shortened syllable appears to be accented. The following occur in a long element:

simillumae sunt (in tr7)

"they are very similar"

dedisse dōnō (starts tr7)

"to have given as a gift"

necesse (e)st facere (in tr7)

"it is necessary to do"

profectō vīdī (starts tr7)

"certainly I saw"

cōnfīge sagittīs fūrēs thēsaurēnsiōs (ia6)

"pierce with arrows the thieves of treasuries"

perind(e) amīcīs ūtitur

"he finds his friends (behaving) accordingly"

If shortening only occurs when the syllable is unaccented, this presents a difficulty. One possibility is that the accentuation of these words was different from the usual rule. Certainly it is known that the accentuation of some words was irregular. For example, phílippus (a coin), borrowed from Greek φίλιππος, seems to have had the Greek accentuation with an accent on the first syllable, and sagitta, possibly another loan word, occurs three times in Plautus as ságitta. Lindsay suggests that classical fenestra "window" is derived from an earlier fénstra, which may have been Plautus's pronunciation. The word périnde "in the same manner" is attested by Priscian as being accented on the first syllable. However, Lindsay calls the apparent accentuation of prófectō "a puzzle". It appears here and two other places at the beginning of a trochaic line, but at least 64 times with the normal accentuation proféctō.

In some cases, editors have assumed a scribal error and have amended the lines to remove difficult scansions such as negǎtō, habĕre, and so on. However, agreement has not been reached on all of them.

==== Sed uxōrem suam ====
Most of the examples above, both in anceps and in long elements, are accented in a way which conform with the verse ictus. However, there are a few examples where following the brevis breviāns there is a clash between accent and ictus. This is often found near the verse end, where a clash of ictus and accent are normal:

sed uxōrem suam (ends ia6)

"but his wife"

apud mēnsam decēt (ends ia6)

"at the table it is fitting..."

patĕfēcī forēs (ends tr7)

"I opened the doors"

voluptātī (e)st mihī (ends tr7)

"it's a pleasure for me"

eg(o) apscessī sciēns (ends tr7)

"I walked away deliberately"

quid hoc autemst malī (ends tr7)

"what kind of evil is this?"

A little further from the verse end are the following:

quod omnēs mortālēs sciunt (ends ia6)

"which all mortals know"

e(a) in potestāte (e)st virī (ends ia6)

"she is under the control of a man"

quidquid in illō vīdulō (e)st (end of ia6)

"whatever is in that box"

But this type also sometimes comes at the beginning of a trochaic septenarius or at the beginning of the second hemistich, where a strong stress on the second syllable of the metron (e.g. argéntum) would violate Meyer's law (see Metres of Roman comedy). Presumably therefore the syllable following the brevis breviāns in each example is not strongly stressed:

quod argentum? quās tū mihi trīcās nārrās? (starts tr7)

"what money? what nonsense are you telling me?"

scio quid dictūra (e)s (starts tr7)

"I know what you're going to say"

eg(o) abs tē mercēdem petam (starts 2nd half, tr7)

"I (will seek) compensation from you"

in occultō iacēbis (starts tr7)

"you will hide in secret"

laběfactō paulātim (starts tr7)

"I'm shaking him gradually" (i.e. persuading him)

sed ĭll(e) ill(am) accipiēt (starts 2nd half, tr7)

"but he will buy her"

Fattori points out that in this last example, the word ille appears to be emphasised, despite being shortened. The whole line is as follows:

nōn ĕg(o) ĭllam mancupi(ō) accēpī. – Sĕd ĭll(e) ill(am) accipiēt, sine. (tr7)

"I haven’t bought her formally." – "But he will buy her formally. Let it be.” (trans. De Melo)

However, the intonation of an ancient language cannot always be known exactly, so this example does not necessarily rule out the view that the shortened syllable must be unaccented.

There are also some trochaic lines beginning with sed interim:

sed interim forēs crepuēre: linguae moderandum (e)st mihi (starts tr7)

"but meanwhile the doors have made a noise: I must watch my tongue"

sed interim quid illīc iamdūdum gnātus cessāt cum Syrō? (starts tr7)

"but meanwhile what is my son doing there all this time with Syrus?"

==== Ubi volēs ====
Sometimes a brevis breviāns in a long element is followed by a two-syllable iambic word which ends the sentence or clause:

ubi volēs (starts tr7; also in ia6)

"when you want"

ibi tibi (ends tr7)

"there for you"

tace modo (ends tr7)

"just be quiet"

tibi dare (ends ia6)

"to give to you"

apud forum (5th long, tr7)

"in the market-place"

==== Abi iam ====
In this group there is one unaccented syllable after the brevis breviāns, and then the sentence ends:

abi iam (tr7)

"go now"

vide sīs (starts tr7)

"see, please"

ab(ī) hīnc sīs (in tr7)

"go away from here please"

tace tū! (starts tr7)

"keep quiet, you!"

neg(o) inquam (tr7)

"that's right, I'm not"

eg(o) inquam (tr7)

"that's right, I am"

certumn(e) est tib(i) istuc? (ia6)

"are you sure of that?"

Phrases of this kind can also sometimes be found with the brevis breviāns in an anceps, e.g. vide sīs (tr7), tace tū! (tr7).

== Parallels in English ==
In Latin, syllable shortening is found only after a preceding single short syllable; thus the second syllable can be shortened in volo but not in crēdō, mandō or redeō. This is sometimes seen in English too. For example, the vowel of -arch is shortened in monarch, but not in Plutārch, heptārch or oligārch. To test this idea a study was made of two-syllable words contained in J. C. Wells's Longman Pronunciation Dictionary. When words such as haddock, hassock, bishop with a short first syllable were compared with others with a long first syllable, such as epoch, kapok, Aesop, the reduced vowel /ə/ was much more commonly found in the first group. In modern linguistics this effect is sometimes known as "Fidelholtz's Law" or the "Arab rule", from the two US pronunciations of the word "Arab" (/ˈeɪˌræb/ and /ˈɛrəb/). Another finding of the study was that "more frequent words are more likely to have a reduced second vowel than less frequent words".

W. S. Allen observed that in two-syllable words ending in -ō such as ĕcho and vēto, the final vowel is more often reduced when the first syllable is short.

In Latin, according to Lindsay, the word accent usually comes either on the syllable before, or on the syllable after the shortened syllable, but not on the shortened syllable itself. This is also true of English. Thus the second vowel is long in allērgic, but shortened in állĕrgy or allĕrgénic. As Devine and Stephens note, in English and other languages words vowels are reduced or deleted both before and after a stress, e.g. d(e)vélopment, féd(e)ral. They also observe that in a sentence such as it would have been fúnny if she'd cóme in rapid speech all the words are reduced except the two stressed ones.

In English, auxiliary verbs such as is, are, will, have, etc. are often shortened (I'll go, it's raining, etc.) Pronouns such as he, we, you can also be shortened when unaccented (is he here?, what are you doing?); and function words, conjunctions and prepositions such as not, because, if, of, for, to are also frequently shortened when unstressed. In the sentence What ăre you afraid of?, where afraid is focussed, the word are is shortened. This is arguably similar to the shortening of est in the Latin equivalent quid ĕst quod metuās?

In Latin, shortening is more likely to occur within a phrase rather than at the end of a sentence, for example, abī vs abĭ sīs. Similarly the word follōw, which usually has a long vowel at the end of a sentence, is shortened in a phrase such as follŏw them.

In words such as volunteer, adaptation, anecdotal, ministerial, where the first syllable is short and the third is accented, the second syllable tends to be short also. These may provide a parallel to Plautus's volŭntāte, volŭptātem, senĕctūte, and minǐstrāret.

In modern linguistic studies of syllable rhythm there is ambiguity in terminology, since words like Latin volō and English follow are metrically iambs, but (since they are accented on the first syllable) accentually trochees. Some works therefore refer to the shortening observed in vólō > vólo as "trochaic shortening".

== Bibliography ==
- Allen, W. S. (1978). Vox Latina: A Guide to the Pronunciation of Classical Latin, 2nd ed. CUP.
- Beare, W. (1953). "The Meaning of Ictus as applied to Latin Verse". Hermathena, No. 81 (May 1953), pp. 29–40.
- Bettini, M. (1991). "La correptio iambica". In Metrica classica e linguistica: atti del colloquio, Urbino 3-6 ottobre 1988 (pp. 89–205). QuattroVenti.
- Dabouis, Quentin; Enguehard, G., Fournier, J-M, Lampitelli, N. (2020). "The English "Arab Rule" without feet". Acta Linguistica Academica, March 2020, 67(1):121–134.
- Devine, A. M.; Stephens, L. D. (1980). "Review Article: Latin Prosody and Meter: Brevis Brevians". Review of Latin-Romance Phonology: Prosodics and Metrics by Ernst Pulgram. Classical Philology Vol. 75, No. 2 (Apr., 1980), pp. 142–157.
- Exon, Charles (1906). "The Relation of the Resolved Arsis and Resolved Thesis in Plautus to the Prose Accent". The Classical Review Vol. 20, No. 1, pp. 31–36.
- Fattori, Marco (2021). "What are we talking about when we talk about ‘iambic shortening’?". Linguistic Studies and Essays 59(2) 2021: 97–132. (Pre-publication copy: )
- Fortson, Benjamin W. (2008). Language and Rhythm in Plautus: Synchronic and Diachronic Studies.
- Fortson, Benjamin W. (2011). "Latin Prosody and Metrics". In J. Clackson (ed.), A companion to the Latin language, 92–104. Malden, MA–Oxford: Wiley-Blackwell.
- Hyde, Brett (2011) "The Iambic-Trochaic Law". In Harry van der Hulst, Colin Ewen, Elizabeth Hume & Keren Rice (eds.), The Blackwell Companion to Phonology, 1052–1077. Oxford University Press.
- Leppermann, H. (1890). De correptione vocabulorum iambicorum, quae apud Plautum in senariis atque septenariis iambicis et trochaicis invenitur. Commentatio philologica. Monasterii Guestf. (Münster)
- Lindsay, W.M. (1893). "The Shortening of Long Syllables in Plautus". The Journal of Philology, Vol. 22, Iss. 44, (Jan 1, 1893): 1.
- Lindsay, W.M. (1922). Early Latin Verse. Oxford.
- Mańczak, W. (1968). "Iambenkürzung im Lateinischen". Glotta 46. Bd., 1./2., pp. 137–143.
- Mester, R.A. (1994). "The Quantitative Trochee in Latin". Natural Language and Linguistic Theory 12. 1–61.
- Meunier, Christine; Espesser, Robert (2011). "Vowel reduction in conversational speech in French: the role of lexical factors." Journal of Phonetics, Elsevier, 2011, 39 (3), pp.271–278.
- Prince, Alan (1991). "Quantitative Consequences of Rhythmic Organization" (lecture).
- Questa, Cesare (2007). La Metrica di Plauto e Terenzio (2007). Urbino: Quattro Venti.
- Raffaelli, Renato (1978). "I longa strappati negli ottonari giambici di Plauto e di Terenzio". In: Problemi di metrica classica. Miscellanea filologica, Genova 1978
- Schlicher, J. J. (1902). "Word-Accent in Early Latin Verse." The American Journal of Philology, Vol. 23, No. 1 (1902), pp. 46–67.
- Sonnenschein, E.A. (1929). "Ictus and Accent in Early Latin Dramatic Verse". The Classical Quarterly, Vol. 23, No. 2 (Apr., 1929), pp. 80–86.
- Stephens, Laurence (1985). "New Evidence concerning Iambic and Cretic Shortening in Classical Latin". Classical Philology Vol. 80, No. 3 (Jul., 1985), pp. 239–244
- Stephens, Laurence (1986). "The Shortening of Final -o in Classical Latin: A Study in Multiple Conditioning and Lexical Diffusion of Sound Change". Indogermanische Forschungen (1986).
- Sturtevant, E.H. (1919). "The Coincidence of Accent and Ictus in Plautus and Terence". Classical Philology, Vol. 14, No. 3 (Jul., 1919), pp. 234–244.
