= Pange lingua gloriosi proelium certaminis =

Gregorian hymn of Passiontide

"Pange lingua gloriosi proelium certaminis" (Latin for 'Sing, tongue, the battle of glorious combat') is a 6th-century AD Latin hymn generally credited to the Christian poet Venantius Fortunatus, Bishop of Poitiers, celebrating the Passion of Christ. In the Catholic Church, the first five stanzas are used at Matins during Passiontide in the Divine Office, with the remaining stanzas (beginning with Lustra sex) sung at Lauds. Both parts are chanted during the Adoration of the Cross on Good Friday.

This hymn later inspired Thomas Aquinas to write the hymn "Pange lingua gloriosi corporis mysterium" for the Feast of Corpus Christi. The hymn is later incorporated into Gustav Holst's The Hymn of Jesus.

== Latin text ==
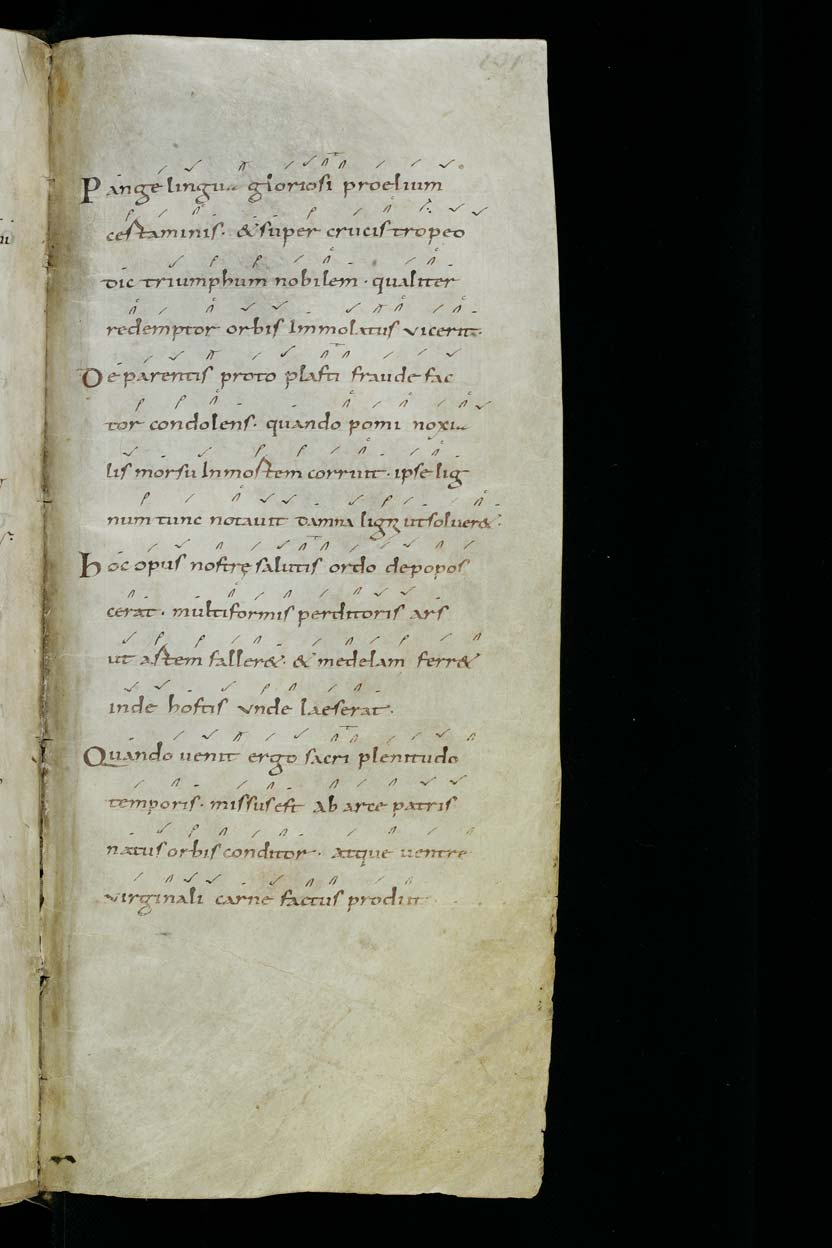
A 10th-century manuscript in the Abbey Library of St Gall, St. Gallen, Switzerland

Pange, lingua, gloriosi proelium certaminis
et super crucis trophaeo dic triumphum nobilem,
qualiter redemptor orbis immolatus vicerit.

De parentis protoplasti fraude factor condolens,
quando pomi noxialis morte morsu corruit,
ipse lignum tunc notavit, damna ligni ut solveret.

Hoc opus nostrae salutis ordo depoposcerat,
multiformis perditoris arte ut artem falleret
et medelam ferret inde, hostis unde laeserat.

Quando venit ergo sacri plenitudo temporis,
missus est ab arce patris natus orbis conditor
atque ventre virginali carne factus prodiit.

Vagit infans inter arta conditus praesaepia,
membra pannis involuta virgo mater adligat,
et pedes manusque crura stricta pingit fascia.

Lustra sex qui iam peracta tempus implens corporis,
se volente, natus ad hoc, passioni deditus,
agnus in crucis levatur immolandus stipite.

Hic acetum, fel, arundo, sputa, clavi, lancea;
mite corpus perforatur; sanguis, unda profluit,
terra pontus astra mundus quo lavantur flumine.

Crux fidelis, inter omnes arbor una nobilis,
nulla talem silva profert flore, fronde, germine,
dulce lignum dulce clavo dulce pondus sustinens.

Flecte ramos, arbor alta, tensa laxa viscera,
et rigor lentescat ille quem dedit nativitas,
ut superni membra regis mite tendas stipite.

Sola digna tu fuisti ferre pretium saeculi
atque portum praeparare nauta mundo naufrago,
quem sacer cruor perunxit fusus agni corpore.

== English translation ==
English translation of five verses by John Mason Neale:

Sing, my tongue, the glorious battle;
Sing the ending of the fray.
Now above the cross, the trophy,
Sound the loud triumphant lay:
Tell how Christ, the world's redeemer,
As a victim won the day.

Tell how, when at length the fullness
Of the appointed time was come,
He, the Word, was born of woman,
Left for us His Father's home,
Blazed the path of true obedience,
Shone as light amidst the gloom.

Thus, with thirty years accomplished,
He went forth from Nazareth,
Destined, dedicated, willing,
Did His work, and met His death;
Like a lamb He humbly yielded
On the cross His dying breath.

Faithful cross, true sign of triumph,
Be for all the noblest tree;
None in foliage, none in blossom,
None in fruit thine equal be;
Symbol of the world's redemption,
For the weight that hung on thee!

Unto God be praise and glory:
To the Father and the Son,
To the eternal Spirit honor
Now and evermore be done;
Praise and glory in the highest,
While the timeless ages run.

The hymn is often sung in English with either the original Mode III tune or the tune FORTUNATUS NEW. The hymn was also loosely adapted into English as 'Praise the Savior' by the nineteenth-century Swedish minister Johan Wallin and set to the tune UPP, MIN TUNGA.

== See also ==
- Trochaic septenarius
