= Alberic of Monte Cassino =

Italian Catholic Cardinal

Alberic of Monte Cassino was a Cardinal in the Roman Catholic Church, who died in 1088. He was a cardinal from 1057.

He was (perhaps) a native of Trier, and became a Benedictine. He successfully opposed the teachings of Berengarius, which were considered heretical by the Pope, defending the measures of Gregory VII during the Investiture Controversy.

He is the author of numerous works in theology, hagiography, grammar, rhetoric and music; and is the author of the earliest medieval treatise on ars dictaminis, or letter-writing (De dictamine). Many of his letters are found in the works of Peter Damian.

One of his pupils, John of Gaeta, was the future Pope Gelasius II.
