= Abecedarian hymn =

An abecedarian hymn is a hymn that begins with the letter A, and each verse or clause following begins with the next letter of the alphabet.

The abecedarian hymn Altus Prosator is used on All Saints Day. Other such hymns include A patre unigenitus, Carmen paschale and Archangelum mirum magnum.

== See also ==
- Acrostic
