= Sālhā del talab-ē jām-e Jam az mā mīkard =

14th-century poem by Hafez

Sālhā del talab-ē jām-e Jam az mā mīkard is a ghazal by the 14th-century Persian poet Hāfez of Shiraz. It is no. 142 (but in the Ganjoor website, no. 143) in The Divān of Hafez by Muhammad Qazvini and Qasem Ghani (1941), and 136 in the edition of Parviz Natel-Khanlari (1983, 2nd ed.). It is described by A. J. Arberry as "one of the finest poems of Hafez".

In this poem Hafez describes how for years he has looked for the precious cup of Jamshid but in the wrong place. Finally he takes his problem to a "Magian Elder" (that is, to a spiritual guide), who has had the cup all along. The Elder reassures him and counsels him that the answer to his quest lies within himself: Love, not Reason, is the way to find God.

According to Arberry, this ghazal may be one of those from the third and last period of Hafez's life. This period is characterised by "an increasing austerity of style, coupled with a growing tendency towards obscurity and allusiveness". The interpretation of the poem is made more difficult by the fact that in different manuscripts the verses are found in a variety of different orders.

== The poem ==
The transcription shows the modern Iranian pronunciation. The letter x is used for kh (as in Khayyam), q for both qeyn and ghāf; " ' " is a glottal stop.

The metre is ramal-e maxbūn ("hemmed ramal "): 3.1.15 in Elwell-Sutton's classification: see Persian metres. In the scheme below, x = anceps (i.e. long or short syllable), u = a short syllable, and – = a long syllable:

| x u – – | u u – – | u u – – | u u – |

This metre is one of Hafez's favourites, and is used in over a quarter (27%) of his poems.

"Overlong" syllables, which take up the position of a long + a short syllable in the metrical pattern, are underlined.

For various recitations of the poem, see External links below.

1
سال‌ها دل طلب جام جم از ما می‌کرد
وان چه خود داشت ز بیگانه تمنا می‌کرد

sālhā del talab-ē jām-e Jam az mā mīkard
v-ān če xod dāšt ze bīgāne tamannā mīkard

For years my heart was seeking Jamshid's cup from us,
and what it had itself, it was requesting from a stranger.

2
گوهری کز صدف کون و مکان بیرون است
طلب از گمشدگان لب دریا می‌کرد

gowhar-ī k-az sadaf-ē kown o makān bīrūn ast
talab az gom-šodegān-ē lab-e daryā mīkard

A jewel which is outside of the shell of space and time
(my heart) was seeking from those lost on the edge of the sea.

3
مشکل خویش بر پیر مغان بردم دوش
کو به تأیید نظر حل معما می‌کرد

moškel-ē xīš bar-ē pīr-e Moqān bordam dūš
k-ū be ta'yīd-e nazar hall-e mo'ammā mīkard

Last night I took my difficulty to the Magian Elder
since he with the assistance of his gaze would solve the riddle.

4
دیدمش خرم و خندان قدح باده به دست
و اندر آن آینه صد گونه تماشا می‌کرد

dīdam-aš xorram o xandān qadah-e bāde be dast
v-andar ān āyene sad gūne tamāšā mīkard

I saw him joyful and laughing, a cup of wine in his hand
and in that mirror he was looking in a hundred ways.

5
گفتم این جام جهان بین به تو کی داد حکیم
گفت آن روز که این گنبد مینا می‌کرد

goftam īn jām-e jahān-bīn be to key dād Hakīm?
goft 'ān rūz ke īn gombad-e mīnā mīkard

I said, "This cup which sees the world, when did the Wise One give it to you?"
He said, "On that day when He was making this blue glass dome.

6
بی دلی در همه احوال خدا با او بود
او نمی‌دیدش و از دور خدا را می‌کرد

bī-del-ī dar hame ahvāl Xodā bā ū būd
ū nemīdīd-aš o az dūr Xodā rā mīkard

"A person who had lost his heart, in all circumstances God was with him;
He never saw Him and from afar kept crying for God.

7
این همه شعبده خویش که می‌کرد این جا
سامری پیش عصا و ید بیضا می‌کرد

īn hamē šo'bade-yē xīš ke mīkard īn jā
Sāmerī pīš-e 'asā vō yad-e beyzā mīkard

"All these conjuring tricks of his which he was doing here,
the Samaritan was doing in front of the Stick and White Hand."

8
گفت آن یار کز او گشت سر دار بلند
جرمش این بود که اسرار هویدا می‌کرد

goft 'ān yār k-az ū gašt sar-e dār boland
jorm-aš 'īn būd ke asrār hoveydā mīkard

He said "That friend for whom the gibbet's head was raised tall –
his crime was this, that he made secrets plain.

9
فیض روح القدس ار باز مدد فرماید
دیگران هم بکنند آن چه مسیحا می‌کرد

feyz-e rūho-l-qodos ar bāz madad farmāyad
dīgarān ham bekonand ān če Masīhā mīkard

"If the bounty of the Holy Spirit once more gives assistance,
others too will do what the Messiah used to do."

10
گفتمش سلسله زلف بتان از پی چیست
گفت حافظ گله‌ای از دل شیدا می‌کرد

goftam-aš selsele-yē zolf-e botān az pey-e čīst?
goft Hāfez gele-ī az del-e šeydā mīkard

I said to him, "What is the purpose of the chain of the curly hair of idols?"
He said, "Hafez was making a complaint about his love-crazed heart."

== Variations ==
The text above is that of Qassem and Ghani (1941) usually quoted. However, some manuscripts have a different order of verses. B and RS have the order 1 2 3 4 5 8 6 7 9 10; F has 1 2 6 3 4 8 * 7 9 5 10; and P has 1 2 3 4 8 * 5 7 9 6 10. (The star * represents an extra verse found in manuscripts F and P.) Parviz Natel Khanlari omits verses 6 and 7 in his edition.

== Characteristics of Hafez's later poems ==
Although the Divan (poetry collection) of Hafez, which was organised after his death by his friend Muhammad Gulandam, is arranged by the usual method of alphabetical order of the rhymes, it is possible to make out to a certain extent which poems are early, middle or late. Arberry, in his analysis of Hafez's style, identifies three phases in the poems. In the first, Hafez's ghazals dealt, like those of his predecessor Saadi, with a single theme; there is little trace of mysticism or Sufic allegory or of Hafez's philosophy of unreason. In the second phase, Hafez began to experiment with introducing two or more themes, or even fragments of themes, at once in the same poem; at the same time, he adopted a more spiritual viewpoint, that life is an insoluble mystery, that cannot be solved with philosophy or legalistic righteousness, but only with unreason and love. In the third phase, Hafez's poems become more severe and more allusive, and almost surrealistic in style. Arberry believes that Hafez's philosophy of unreason would have provided him with spiritual comfort in a period of history which witnessed the terrible devastations and massacres of the Mongols.

Similarly, Dick Davis notes the diverse themes in this ghazal: "In its mixture of various religious groupings, and its mingling of references to both secular pleasures (the wine, the beauties of the last stanza) and mystical insight (Jamshid's cup, Hallaj's martyrdom), and in its recommendation that one look inward for the truth (the pearl one has lost) the poem is typical of Hafez's polyphonic/polysemous poetic strategies."

== Notes on individual verses ==
=== Verse 1 ===
Jām-e Jam "the cup of Jamshid" was famous in Persian poetry as a cup belonging to the legendary king Jam or Jamshid, in which he could see the whole world. The cup appears in Ferdowsi's Shahnameh, but there the "world-seeing cup" is not Jamshid's but the cup of a later king, Kay Khosrow; however, it is implied that the cup was once Jamshid's, since he is described as knowing all the mysteries of the world. By the time of the mystic poet Sanā'ī the cup is explicitly stated to be Jamshid's.

In Sana'i's mystical narrative poem Ilāhī-Nāma or Elahi-Nameh, one of the six sections tells the story of a king's son who wanted to possess the cup. His father tells him the true spiritual meaning of the cup, which is that to attain eternity, he must leave behind the world, as Kay Khosow did, and annihilate himself.

=== Verse 2 ===
The subject of the verb mīkard is del "my heart", which must be understood. The pearl for which my heart was seeking is the pearl of divine knowledge.

The "sea" is used in mystic poetry as a metaphor for divine love. The early 12th-century mystic poet Sana'i wrote:

عشق دریای محیط و آب دریا آتشست
موجها آید که گویی کوههای ظلمتست

'ešq daryā-yē mohīt ō āb-e daryā ātaš ast
mowjhā āyad ke gū'ī kūhhā-yē zolmat ast

Love is a sea which encircles the world and the water of the sea is fire;
waves are coming which are like the mountains of the place of darkness.

Those who are lost by the shore of the sea are those who have never experienced the mystic ecstasy and torments of divine love.

Arberry compares ghazal 1 (Alā yā ayyoha-s-sāqī) verse 5:

The dark night and the fear of the waves and so terrifying a whirlpool –
how can the lightly-burdened people of the coasts possibly know our state?

=== Verse 3 ===
The "Magian Elder" is literally a Zoroastrian wine-seller (since Muslims were not allowed to sell wine); but in Hafez's poetry it stands for the Pir ("Elder") or Murshid ("Spiritual leader") who helped Sufi disciples in the path leading to union with God.

=== Verse 4 ===
Arberry compares the ghazal ey hodhod-ē Sabā, verse 7, where he notes: "The poet compares the wine-cup (the symbol of unreason) with the all-revealing mirror of Alexander."

=== Verse 5 ===
The name Hakīm "the Wise One" is often given to God in the Qur'an (e.g. Qur'an 2.32, 2.129, etc.). Arberry comments: "Can any doubt remain after this verse that Hafiz intends by the imagery of the wine-cup the ecstatic's rapt vision?"

=== Verse 7 ===
This verse refers (using the Arabic words 'asā "stick", yad "hand" and beyzā "white") to the Qur'an, Sura 20, in which (verses 17–23) God gives Moses two signs: first He transforms Moses's stick into a snake and then He makes his hand white; Moses then uses his stick in a competition of sorcery with the Pharaoh's magicians (verses 56–73). Later in the same Sura (verses 85–99) God reveals to Moses that during his absence the Sāmirī (or Samaritan) has led his people astray by having them worship a Golden Calf. Hafez here appears to conflate the stories of the magician (sāherī) who competed with Moses and the Samaritan (Sāmerī) who led the people astray with the Golden Calf.

Four manuscripts (B, RS, F, and P) have a slightly different text in this verse: ān hamē šo'bade-yē 'aql "all that sorcery of reason". Hafez often adopts the theme that Love, nor Reason, is the way to God. Clarke comments: "As, opposed to the white hand and staff of Mūsā, the sorceries of the sorcerer Sāmiri were ineffective,– so, opposed to love (of God) and to the Pir of the Magians (the Murshid), the sorceries of reason are useless."

The story of the magicians' competition is told in the Bible in Exodus 7:8–13 and the story of the Golden Calf in Exodus 32. In the Bible, however, it is not a Samaritan but Moses' brother Aaron who makes the calf.

=== Verse 8 ===
Verse 8 refers to the Sufi mystic Husayn Mansur Al-Hallaj, who was tortured and hanged for heresy or blasphemy in Baghdad in 922. He is famous for having uttered the phrase ana al-Ḥaqq "I am the Truth" (a description often given to God himself).

The idea that the gallows which killed al-Hallaj lifted its head proud as well as tall is implied in Arberry's translation: "That friend ... glorified the tree that slew him for his crime."

Following this verse two manuscripts have an extra verse. One manuscript has it in the following form:

وآنکه چون غنچه دلش راز حقیقت بنهفت
ورق خاطر از این نکته محشا می‌کرد

v-ānke čūn qonče del-aš rāz-e haqīqat benhoft
varaq-ē xāter az īn nokte mohaššā mīkard

And he whose heart, like a rosebud, had hidden the secret of the truth
was annotating the page of his memory with this point.

The other has:

ānke čūn qonče lab-aš rāz-e haqīqat benhoft
varaq-ē daftar az īn nosxe mohaššā mīkard

And he whose lip, like a rosebud, had hidden the secret of the truth
was annotating the page of the book from this copy.

=== Verse 9 ===
In four of the early manuscripts verse 9 follows directly on verse 7.

The phrase rūḥu-l-qudus(i) "the spirit of holiness" occurs four times in the Qur'an (see Holy Spirit in Islam); for example, Qur'an 2.87, where God says ayyadnā-hu bi rūḥi-l-qudus "we supported him (Jesus) with the Holy Spirit".

A similar idea to this verse is expressed in Hafez's ghazal 407 (in the Qazvini-Ghani edition) Mazra'-ē sabz-e falak, verse 3: "If you go pure and naked like the Messiah to Heaven, from your lamp a hundred rays will reach the Sun."

=== Verse 10 ===
Bot (literally "Buddha") is a word used in Persian poetry to describe a beautiful youth. The long locks of the beloved are compared to a chain which holds the lover captive. The Elder is advising Hafez that he is now on the right path towards union with God.

== Translations ==
Several translators have made versions of this ghazal, among them Walter Leaf (1898), John Payne (1901), Arberry (1947), and Dick Davis (2008). One of the earliest is the following by Herman Bicknell, published in 1875:

Of me my heart sought many a year the goblet of King Jam;
To that which it possessed, it strove by outward aid to come.

It sought a pearl which in no shell of time and space abode,
From those who by the ocean strand had wandered from their road.

Last eve unto the Magian Shaikh, to solve my doubts, I flew,
To him who by his piercing gaze to secrets found the clue.

I saw him smiling and content, the wine-cup in his hand,
And in its world-revealing glass a hundred things he scanned.

I said: "When gave the Lord All-wise that wondrous cup to thee?"
He said: "When the enamelled Dome was formed by His decree.

He further said: "That friend, by whom the gibbet's head grew high,
"Did wrong when he to others told the secrets of the sky."

"One reft of heart is held by God in every case most dear,
"But man beholds Him not, and cries to God as one not near.

"The tricks that we ourselves behold, by juggling Reason planned,
"Were played by Samir, who opposed the Staff and the White Hand.

"If, by the Holy Spirit's grace, the gift again he won,
"The works which the Messiah wrought by others may be done."

I said to him: "What use is there
"In Beauty's locks like chains?"
"From his heart's depths, where madness rules,
"HAFIZ," he said, "complains."

== Bibliography ==
- Arberry, A. J. (1947). 50 Poems of Hafez. Introduction, pp. 1–34, translation, pp. 97–98, and notes pp. 153–154.
- Clarke, H. Wilberforce (1897). Dīvān-i-Hāfiz. Vol 1. pp. 258–259.
- Davis, Dick (2008). "For years my heart inquired of me". Translation published in Poetry, April 2008, with notes.
- Nematollahi, Narges (2018) "The true meaning of the Cup of Jamsheed: medieval and pre-modern symbolic readings of the Shāhnāmeh". Paper presented to Middle Eastern Studies Association 2018.

== Other poems by Hafez ==
- Alā yā ayyoha-s-sāqī – QG 1
- Shirazi Turk – QG 3
- Zolf-'āšofte – QG 26
- Dūš dīdam ke malā'ek – QG 184
- Naqdhā rā bovad āyā – QG 185
- Goftā borūn šodī – QG 406
- Mazra'-ē sabz-e falak – QG 407
- Sīne mālāmāl – QG 470
