= Mazra'-ē sabz-e falak =

14th-century poem by Hafez

The poem Mazra'-ē sabz-e falak ("the Green Farmland of the Sky") is a ghazal (love song) by the 14th-century Persian poet Hafez of Shiraz. It has been called "the second most debated ghazal of Hafiz, the first being the Shirazi Turk". It is no. 407 in the edition of Hafez's ghazals by Muhammad Qazvini and Qasim Ghani (1941), according to the usual alphabetical arrangement by rhyme.

At the beginning of the poem, Hafez is reminded by the sight of the night sky of his own failings and the unlikelihood of his reaching Heaven; but an adviser encourages him to be optimistic. In the last three verses, Hafez turns his attention to the beauty of his beloved, and declares that the path of Love will lead to Heaven more surely than false and hypocritical religious practice. The poem is full of astronomical imagery of the Sun, Moon, and stars, and also of metaphors of sowing and harvest.

Scholarly debate over this poem especially concerns whether it presents an artistic unity, and if so, whether the type of unity differs from the type of unity found in European art.

== The poem ==
The text given below is that of the edition of Muhammad Qazvini and Qasem Ghani (1941). In addition to the usual eight verses below, there are also three "floating verses" which are included in some editions but rejected by most editors. Bashiri (1979) also regards verse 5, which differs from the others in its imagery, as spurious.

In the transcription, "x" represents the sound kh (خ) as in Khayyam. The letters gheyn (غ) and qāf (ق) are both written as "q"; the sign " ' " represents a glottal stop. "Overlong" syllables, that is, syllables which can take the place of a long plus a short syllable in the metre, are underlined.

1
مزرع سبز فلک دیدم و داس مه نو
یادم از کشته خویش آمد و هنگام درو

mazra'-ē sabz-e falak dīdam o dās-ē mah-e now
yād-am az kešte-ye xīš āmad o hengām-e derow

I saw the green farmland of Heaven and the sickle of the new Moon;
I was reminded of what I myself had sown, and the time of harvest.

2
گفتم ای بخت بخسپیدی و خورشید دمید
گفت با این همه از سابقه نومید مشو

goftam ey baxt! bexospīdi o xoršīd damīd
goft bā īn hame az sābeqe nowmīd mašow

I said, O Fortune! You fell asleep and the Sun has risen!
He said, Despite everything, do not be despondent about the past.

3
گر روی پاک و مجرد چو مسیحا به فلک
از چراغ تو به خورشید رسد صد پرتو

gar ravī pāk o mojarrad čo Masīhā be falak
az čerāq-ē to be xoršīd rasad sad partow

If you go pure and naked like the Messiah to Heaven,
from your lamp a hundred rays will reach the Sun.

4
تکیه بر اختر شب دزد مکن کاین عیار
تاج کاووس ببرد و کمر کیخسرو

takye bar axtar-e šab-dozd makon, k-īn 'ayyār
tāj-e Kāvūs bebord ō kamar-ē Key Xosrow

Do not rely on the night-thief star, since this traitor
stole Kavus' crown and the belt of Kay Khosrow.

5
گوشوار زر و لعل ار چه گران دارد گوش
دور خوبی گذران است نصیحت بشنو

gūšvār-ē zar o la'l ar če gerān dārad gūš
dowr-e xūbī gozarān ast; nasīhat bešenow!

Though an earring of gold and rubies weighs down your ear,
the period of goodness is fleeting; listen to advice!

6
چشم بد دور ز خال تو که در عرصه حسن
بیدقی راند که برد از مه و خورشید گرو

čašm-e bad dūr ze xāl-ē to ke dar 'arse-ye hosn
beydaq-ī rānd ke bord az mah o xoršīd gerow

May the evil eye be far from that mole of yours, since on the chess-board of beauty
it has played a pawn which has checkmated the Moon and Sun!

7
آسمان گو مفروش این عظمت کاندر عشق
خرمن مه به جوی خوشه پروین به دو جو

āsmān gū maforūš īn 'azamat k-andar 'ešq
xerman-ē mah be jov-ī, xūše-ye Parvīn be do jow

Tell the sky: do not sell this magnificence, since in Love
the Moon's harvest sells for a barley grain, and the Pleiades' ear of corn for two grains.

8
آتش زهد و ریا خرمن دین خواهد سوخت
حافظ این خرقه پشمینه بینداز و برو

ātaš-ē zohd o riyā xerman-e dīn xāhad sūxt
Hāfez, īn xerqe-ye pašmīne biyandāz o borow!

The fire of asceticism and hypocrisy will consume the harvest of religion.
Hafez, throw off this woollen cloak and go!

== The metre ==
The metre is called ramal-e maxbūn ("hemmed ramal"), since in contrast to the usual ramal with its feet of – u – –, all the feet except the first are "hemmed", that is, shortened, to u u – –. It is a catalectic metre since the last foot fa'ilātun lacks the final syllable and becomes fa'ilun.

In the scheme below, x = anceps (i.e. long or short syllable), u = a short syllable, and – = a long syllable:

| x u – – | u u – – | u u – – | u u – |

In Elwell-Sutton's system of Persian metres this metre is classified as 3.1.15. The final pair of short syllables is biceps, that is, the two short syllables may be replaced by a single long syllable; this occurs in about 35% of lines. The first syllable in this metre is long in about 80% of lines.

This metre is fairly common in classical Persian lyric poetry, and is used in 143 (27%) of the 530 poems of Hafez.

== Interpretation ==
It has been argued that the poem has a Sufic intent and describes the possibility of reaching union with the Divine through the Sufic Way of Love. The poem has been compared with another ghazal of Hafez, Goftā borūn šodī with which it shares many of the same themes.

Both poems begin with Hafez viewing the New Moon; in both a spiritual adviser rebukes Hafez for this. Both contain a verse in which the New Moon is associated in some way with the crown of ancient Iranian kings. In one poem the glory of the sky, in the other the "perfume of Reason", is said to be worth no more than a barley-corn in comparison with Love.

Each verse of the present poem except the first contains a verb in the 2nd person ("you"), but the speaker and the person spoken to seem to differ in different parts of the poem, making the interpretation complex.

== Comments on individual verses ==
=== Verse 1 ===
The opening of the poem recalls Saadi's lines from the Golestan, in which Saadi in the same way as Hafez rues the time which he has wasted so far:

ای که پنجاه رفت و در خوابی
مگر این پنج روز دریابی

ey ke panjāh raft o dar xābī
magar īn panj rūz daryābī?

Oh you for whom fifty years have gone and you are asleep –
do you expect to find the answer in these five days?

Bashiri explains that mazra' is farmland which has been sown, or prepared for sowing (as opposed to mazra'e, which is an individual farm or field).

Hillmann (2018) points out the assonance of the vowel [a] in the first line of this verse.

=== Verse 2 ===
Dick Davis translates: "I said, 'My luck ...' She said ..." and interprets this verse as a dialogue between Hafez and his luck. Hillmann also follows this interpretation. Bashiri has a different view, namely that bexoftīdī "you fell asleep" is not addressed to Fortune, but by the poet to himself, as in the verse of Saadi quoted above. The reply (goft "he said"), according to Bashiri, is not spoken by Fortune, but by an elder who (as often in Hafez's poems) gives advice and encouragement to his disciple.

Hillmann points out the alliteration of the sounds [b], [x], [d] in the first line of this verse. There is also internal rhyme between xoršīd, nowmīd (which in Hafez's day were pronounced with the vowel [-ēd]) and assonance with the [-īd] of bexosbīdī, damīd.

=== Verse 3 ===
The raising of Christ to heaven by God is mentioned in the Qur'an (3.55, 4.158).

Bashiri interprets this verse as follows: "If Man cultivates his potential for love, and thereby ascends to the heavens untrammeled as Christ did, his inner, spiritual light is enough to outshine all the cosmic luminaries."

Hillmann (2018) points out the assonance of [a] sounds, and of [sad sad].

=== Verse 4 ===
Kay Kavus (or Ka'us) and Kay Khosrow were legendary ancient kings of Iran, mentioned in Ferdowsi's Shahnameh.

The "night-thief star", according to Clarke and the 16th-century Ottoman commentator Ahmed Sudi, is the Moon. The following verse, from the poem Goftā borūn šodī (ghazal QG 406), mentioning the Moon and two further legendary kings, Siyāmak and Zow or Zaav, is parallel:

شکل هلال هر سر مه می‌دهد نشان
از افسر سیامک و ترک کلاه زو

šakl-ē helāl har sar-e mah mīdehad nešān
az 'afsar-ē Siyāmak o tark-ē kolāh-e Zow

The shape of the crescent at the beginning of each month gives a sign
of the diadem of Siyamak and the helmet of Zow's crown / the abandonment of Zow's crown.

Avery and Heath-Stubbs say of verse 4: "This 'thief of the night' is not the sickle of the new moon, yet it too reaps: not souls, but the vainglorious things of this world." Bashiri suggests that the star is not the Moon but the Sun. However, the parallel with ghazal 406 makes it clear that it is indeed the New Moon.

The theme of the turning heaven sweeping away even great kings of the past occurs elsewhere in Hafez, for example in ghazal 101 where (in Gertrude Bell's translation) Hafez writes:

که آگه است که کاووس و کی کجا رفتند
که واقف است که چون رفت تخت جم بر باد

ke āgah ast ke Kāvūs o Key kojā raftand?
ke vāqef ast ke čūn raft taxt-e Jam bar bād?

What man can tell where Kaus and Kai have gone?
Who knows where even now the restless wind
Scatters the dust of Djem's imperial throne?

A similar theme is found in another ghazal of Hafez (no. 201 in the Qazvini-Ghani edition):

مبین حقیر گدایان عشق را کاین قوم
شهان بی کمر و خسروان بی کلهند

mabīn haqīr gedāyān-e 'ešq rā k-īn qowm
šahān-e bī-kamar ō Khosrovān-e bī-kolah-and

Do not despise the beggars of Love, since this tribe
are beltless kings and crownless Khosrows.

The first line of this verse is notable for its assonance of the sound [a], while the second has alliteration of [k].

=== Verse 5 ===
The addressee of this verse is not certain. Does it continue the Sufic Elder's advice in verses 2 to 4, or is the advice given to the handsome youth whom Hafez addresses in verse 6?

Translators usually explain dowr-e xūbī gozarān ast ("the turn of goodness is fleeting") as addressed to the beautiful youth, reminding him that he will not be young for ever – presumably the same youth whose mole is praised in verse 6: they give translations such as "the season of youthfulness is passing" (Clarke), "the cycle of beauty is passing" (Wickens), "attend the voice which tells how beauty fades" (Avery & Heath-Stubbs, p. 58). Alternatively this verse continues the theme of the previous one: "Even though you may be as wealthy as those kings, such wealth cannot last".

The word گران gerān can have various meanings: "heavy"; "valuable"; "troublesome" or "annoying". Another possible meaning is "heavy, deaf to advice".

Clarke interprets the "earring of gold and rubies" as "profitable counsel". Avery and Heath-Stubbs see the weighing down of the ear as harvest imagery. Otherwise this verse seems to have different imagery from the others, since there is no mention of harvest or the heavens. Bashiri for various reasons thinks it is an interpolation.

Hillmann (2018) points out the alliteration of the consonant [g] in these two lines.

=== Verse 6 ===
The xāl "mole" in the language of Persian love-poetry was considered a symbol of particular beauty on the face of the beloved (see Hafez's Shirazi Turk).

Bashiri calls the image of the chess game "a profound and masterly stroke". He explains: "It is the rule in the game of chess that if a player can move his pawn (baidaq or baidhaq), the smallest piece on the board, in such a way that it can pass the seven squares unharmed, it will turn into the most powerful piece on the board, the queen. The player is the beloved, the pawn is man and the seven squares are the seven fathers that constitute the Solar System. With the guidance of love, says the poet, man is able to transcend the limits of the phenomenal world (chashm-i bad) and enter the abode of the beloved." However, in the medieval Persian form of chess, on reaching the eighth rank the pawn did not become a queen but a ferz or farzīn (counsellor), which although it took the same position on the board as the modern queen was not as powerful and could move only one step diagonally. (See Shatranj.) The word beydaq itself is derived through Arabic from the Middle Persian piyādag "footsoldier".

The phrase bord az mah o xoršīd gerow is variously translated: "from the moon and sun, the bet won" (Clarke); "taking the prize from moon and sun" (Wickens); "beats the moon and sun" (Avery and Heath-Stubbs).

=== Verse 7 ===
This verse refers back to the first verse, with آسمان (āsmān or āsemān) "the sky" replacing its synonym فلک falak. Bashiri explains this verse as that, even though he is no more significant than a grain of barley, "because man is invested with the love of the beloved, he has the potential to outshine the cosmos".

خرمن (xerman or xarman) means the crop after it has been harvested and piled up, but before it is threshed; it can also mean the halo of the Moon.

This verse corresponds to one of similar meaning in ghazal 406:

مفروش عطر عقل به هندوی زلف ما
کان جا هزار نافه مشکین به نیم جو

mafrūš 'etr-e 'aql be hendū-ye zolf-e mā
k-ān jā hezār nāfe-ye moškīn be nīm jow

Do not sell the perfume of Reason for the blackness of our hair!
For there a thousand musk-pods sell at half a barley-corn!

Bashiri explains that the path of Reason ('aql) is contrasted with the path of Love ('ešq); the former is worthless in achieving union with the Divine.

There is alliteration of [m] in the two halves of the verse.

=== Verse 8 ===
Hafez's rejection of showy ascetism (zohd), hypocrisy (riyā or riā), and sham Sufism, represented by the woollen cloak (xerqe) proclaiming the Sufi's spirituality, is well described in Lewis (2002). For Hafez, the true road to union with the divine is through Love, not through intellect or religious practice.

Annemarie Schimmel writes: "The khirqa was usually dark blue. It was practical for travel, since dirt was not easily visible on it, and at the same time it was the color of mourning and distress; its intention was to show that the Sufi had separated himself from the world and what is in it."

Some commentators see the phrase īn xerqe-ye pašmīne biyandāz "throw off this woollen cloak" as meaning that Hafez should "throw off the cloak of hypocritical zeal". "If the poet were to remain in his khirqa-yi pashmīna, symbol of worldly values (or dīn), he too would be consumed like the rest of the cosmos." However, it is probable that the casting off of the cloak is symbolic rather than a rejection of Sufism as such; just as the whirling dervishes of Konya cast aside their black cloaks before beginning their ritual dance.

With the final verb برو borow "go" Hafez refers back to the same verb روی ravī "you go" in verse 3. Inspired by love, having thrown off the trammels of hypocrisy and the dervish cloak, he is now prepared to ascend pure and naked to heaven.

== Artistic unity ==
Hafez's ghazals have sometimes been criticised for their apparent lack of unity and for the fact that it sometimes seems that the verses could be rearranged in a different order without making much difference to the thought. Wickens finds that though a ghazal has a close-knit structure of thematic patterns, it lacks one aspect of Western art, namely the idea of development to a climax or conflict and its resolution. On the contrary, in his view, Persian art is more "radial" or "spoke-like" with the ideas arranged around a central focal point. He finds the same kind of radial unity of structure in Persian architecture and the design of carpets.

Bashiri, on the other hand, follows those who argue that there are at least two types of ghazal in Hafez, one the ordinary love ghazal, and the other the Sufic ghazal, in which the various stages of the seeker's progress on the Way to union with the Divine are presented. Thus there is a structure to these ghazals which is often missed by Western critics.

== Other Hafez poems ==
There are articles on the following poems by Hafez on Wikipedia. The number in the edition by Muhammad Qazvini and Qasem Ghani (1941) is given:

- Alā yā ayyoha-s-sāqī – QG 1
- Shirazi Turk – QG 3
- Zolf-'āšofte – QG 26
- Sālhā del – QG 143
- Dūš dīdam ke malā'ek – QG 184
- Naqdhā rā bovad āyā – QG 185
- Goftā borūn šodī – QG 406
- Sīne mālāmāl – QG 470
