= Dūš dīdam ke malā'ek dar-e mey-xāne zadand =

14th-century poem by Hafez

Dūš dīdam ke malā'ek dar-e meyxāne zadand is a ghazal by the 14th-century Persian poet Hafez of Shiraz. The poem is no. 184 in the edition of Hafez's works by Muhammad Qazvini and Qasem Ghani (1941), and 179 in the edition of Parviz Natel-Khānlari (2nd ed. 1983). It was made famous in English by a well-known translation by Gertrude Bell (1897): "Last night I dreamed that angels stood without / The tavern door and knocked".

In this clearly Sufic poem, Hafez describes a vision when he felt he was being given wine by angels. He expresses astonishment that he, despite his lowly status, should be given this privilege. In the second half of the poem he expresses his gratitude to God and makes a reference to the doctrine that total surrender to Love is the surest way to achieve knowledge of the Divine.

The interpretation of the part played by the angels in this poem and their role in the creation of Adam has been much debated by Hafez scholars.

== The poem ==
The text below is that of the edition of Muhammad Qazvini and Qasem Ghani (1941) (but Parviz Natel-Khanlari's edition has the same order of verses). In the transcription, "x" represents the sound kh (خ) as in Khayyam, the letters gheyn (غ) and qāf (ق) are both written as "q ", and the sign " ' " represents a glottal stop. "Overlong" syllables, that is, syllables which can take the place of a long plus a short syllable in the metre, are underlined.

For various recitations of the poem, see External links below.

1
دوش دیدم که ملایک در میخانه زدند
گل آدم بسرشتند و به پیمانه زدند

dūš dīdam ke malā'ek dar-e mey-xāne zadand
gel-e 'Ādam besereštand o be peymāne zadand

Last night I saw angels knocking on the door of a wine-house;
they kneaded Adam's clay and struck it into/with a cup.

2
ساکنان حرم سر و عفاف ملکوت
با من راه نشین باده مستانه زدند

sākenān-ē haram-ē ser o 'efāf-ē malakūt
bā man-ē rāh-nešīn bāde-ye mastāne zadand

The inhabitants of the sanctuary of modesty and abstinence of Heaven
with me, a wayside beggar, drank intoxicating wine.

3
آسمان بار امانت نتوانست کشید
قرعه کار به نام من دیوانه زدند

āsmān bār-e 'amānat natavānest kešīd
qor'e-ye kār be nām-ē man-e dīvāne zadand

Heaven was not able to bear the weight of the Trust that was given to it;
They cast the dice of the work in the name of me, who am crazy.

4
جنگ هفتاد و دو ملت همه را عذر بنه
چون ندیدند حقیقت ره افسانه زدند

jang-e haftād o do mellat hame rā 'ozr beneh
cūn nadīdand haqīqat, rah-e 'afsāne zadand

Give pardon to all the seventy-two warring sects;
It is because they didn't see the truth, that they went by the way of fables.

5
شکر ایزد که میان من و او صلح افتاد
صوفیان رقص کنان ساغر شکرانه زدند

šokr-e Īzad ke miyān-ē man o 'ū solh oftād
sūfiyān raqs-konān sāqar-e šokrāne zadand

Thanks be to God, that between Him and me there is now peace;
The Sufis, dancing, have quaffed the cup of gratitude.

6
آتش آن نیست که از شعله او خندد شمع
آتش آن است که در خرمن پروانه زدند

ātaš ān nīst ke 'az šo'le-ye 'ū xandad šam'
ātaš ān ast ke dar xerman-e parvāne zadand

Fire is not that with whose flame the candle laughs;
fire is that with which they burnt up the harvest of the moth.

7
کس چو حافظ نگشاد از رخ اندیشه نقاب
تا سر زلف سخن را به قلم شانه زدند

kas čo Hāfez nagošād az rox-e 'andīše neqāb
tā sar-ē zolf-e soxan rā be qalam šāne zadand

No one like Hafez has removed the veil from the cheek of thought,
since they began to comb the curls of hair of speech with a pen.

== The metre ==
The metre is called ramal-e maxbūn ("hemmed ramal"), since in contrast to the usual ramal with its feet of – u – –, all the feet except the first are "hemmed", that is, shortened, to u u – –. It is a catalectic metre since the last foot fa'ilātun lacks the final syllable and becomes fa'ilun.

In the scheme below, x = anceps (i.e. long or short syllable), u = a short syllable, and – = a long syllable:

| x u – – | u u – – | u u – – | u u – |

In Elwell-Sutton's system of Persian metres this metre is classified as 3.1.15. The final pair of short syllables is biceps, that is, the two short syllables may be replaced by a single long syllable; this occurs in about 35% of lines. The first syllable in this metre is long in about 80% of lines.

This metre is fairly common in classical Persian lyric poetry, and is used in 143 (27%) of the 530 poems of Hafez.

== Notes on individual verses ==
=== Verse 1 ===
The meaning of this verse has been much debated. Mahouzi (2018) writes concerning the first two verses:

"These two verses have been controversial from many points of view, and there have been differences between Hafez scholars concerning their interpretation. These differences principally concern the role which the angels played in the creation of Man. The first question is how the angels had a role in creating Adam and kneading his mud. Were the angels not those same cavilling praise-singers who criticised God for creating Adam? If Love is what separates man from angels, what are the angels doing at the door of the tavern of Love (particularly at that time when Adam’s mud had not yet been kneaded)? What did Hafez mean by "striking Adam’s mud to a cup"? In addition, what is the meaning of an angel drinking wine with a human? Hafez specialists have given various interpretations of these lines each of which in turn has naturally added to the complications." (Translated from the Persian.)

Mahouzi quotes another verse of Hafez in which an angel is represented as standing at the door of the tavern, which makes it clear that the time being spoken about was that period when Adam was being created out of clay:

بر در میخانه عشق ای ملک تسبیح گوی
کاندر آن جا طینت آدم مخمر می‌کنند

bar dar-ē mey-xāne-yē 'ešq ey malak tasbīh gūy!
k-andar ān jā tīnat-ē 'Ādam moxammar mīkonand

O Angel, at the door of the tavern of Love say your praises,
since in that place they are fermenting the clay of Adam!

The Iranian scholar Bahaoddin Khorramshahi explains that the first three couplets are a summary of chapter 4 of the book Mirsād al-'Ibād by the 13th-century Sufi philosopher Najm al-Din Razi. In this chapter Razi depicts the workshop of Creation as a tavern where the angels have brought the clay of Adam to the divine Vintner who will knead it into the shape of man.

According to one tradition, Adam's clay was fermented for forty days. Annemarie Schimmel explains: "Mowlana alludes not rarely to the tradition that God kneaded Adam's clay for forty days, and connects this kneading of the dough and its fermentation with the intoxication which still permeates man – verses echoed most perfectly by Hafez."

Some Iranian Hafez scholars interpret the cup as a mould into which the clay from which Adam was created was placed. This interpretation was followed by Herman Bicknell (1875) in his translation: "They shaped the clay of Adam, flung into moulds its weight."

Clarke (1891) writes that the angels hoped that God might "pour into their vessels of readiness the wine of love from the wine-house of the divine world"; but in this they were disappointed and the door was shut in their face.

Gertrude Bell (1897), however, interprets the line as meaning that the angels moulded Adam's clay into a cup. Similarly Bly and Lewisohn translate: "They had kneaded the clay of Adam, And they threw the clay in the shape of a wine cup". Gertrude Bell explains: "I think he means that man himself is the vessel into which divine love and wisdom are poured: and when he says that the angels first brought him wine, he means that by their example they showed him what it was to be intoxicated by the contemplation of God."

Arberry (1947) explains the verse as follows: "(Hafez) saw himself being served with wine by angels out of a cup fashioned of Adam's dust." Most commentators, however, explain the lines as referring not to Adam's dust after he died, but to the clay from which his body was formed at the time of his creation by God.

Seif (2019) interprets the verse as meaning that the angels soaked Adam's clay in wine, to help it ferment.

=== Verse 2 ===
The phrase sāqar zadan, which occurs in verse 5, means "to quaff a cup". Some commentators interpret the phrase in this verse, bāde zadan, as having a similar meaning, namely that the angels drank wine with Hafez. Clarke, however, interprets the verse as meaning that the angels "cast" the wine on Hafez, and Arberry translates "they sprinkled the wine of drunkenness over me"; Seif interprets the line as meaning "they softened me with wine".

The wine itself has a symbolic meaning in Sufism. Hafiz is said to have explained this verse as follows to the conqueror Tamerlane (although the story itself is probably not authentic):

"Hafiz said, 'O Amir, drinking wine is a Sufic idiom. It does not refer to drinking wine in the general sense. It alludes to the acquisition of knowledge from the perfect ones. However, in the same way that ordinary wine, the drinking of which is not allowed, causes intoxication, the acquisition of knowledge from the initiate also induces a similar drunkenness for the seeker.'"

Two manuscripts, instead of rāh-nešīn "beggar", "one who sits by the road", have xāk-nešīn "dweller on the earth". Seif argues that this reading is preferable, because of the antithesis with heaven in the first half of the verse. However, Lewis notes: "Hafez describes himself more than once as a beggar (gadā). He is the beggar who retreats from society to sit alone in a corner (gadā-ye guša-nešin)."

=== Verse 3 ===
On the word 'amānat Annemarie Schimmel explains: "Man was entrusted with the amāna, the "trust" (Sura 33:72) that Heaven and earth refused to carry — a trust that has been differently interpreted: as responsibility, free will, love, or the power of individuation." The Qur'anic verse in question reads: "Indeed, we offered the Trust to the heavens and the earth and the mountains, and they declined to bear it and feared it; but man [undertook to] bear it. Indeed, he was unjust and ignorant." Arberry comments, "God created man to be his vice-gerent", citing Qur'an Sura 2:30 and 6:166 (165).

قرعه qor'e is defined by Steingass as "A die; a throw of dice; drawing lots, a lottery". Some editors, for قرعه کار qor'e-ye kār "the lottery of the work", read قرعه فال qor'e-ye fāl "the casting of the lot". de Fouchécour explains: "They cast lots, and the lot fell on this poor mad poet (i.e. Adam)".

=== Verse 4 ===
There was a tradition that in Islam there are 72 different sects. Arberry quotes Omar Khayyam:

می خور که ز دل کثرت و قلت ببرد
و اندیشه هفتاد و دو ملت ببرد
پرهیز مکن ز کیمیایی که از او
یک جرعه خوری هزار علت ببرد

mey xor, ke ze del kesrat o qellat bebarad
v-andīše-ye haftād o do mellat bebarad
parhīz makon ze kīmiyā-ī ke az ū
yek jor'e xorī, hezār 'ellat bebarad

Drink wine, since it removes from the heart both excess and insufficiency;
and it removes the theology of the seventy-two sects.
Do not abstain from that alchemy from which
if you drink one sip it removes a thousand reasons.

In his Rubaiyat of Omar Khayyam (1859), the poet Edward FitzGerald translated this as follows:

The Grape that can with Logic absolute
The two-and-seventy jarring sects confute;
The sovereign Alchemist that in a trice
Life's leaden metal into Gold transmute.

=== Verse 5 ===
In this verse, three of the manuscripts have the word حوریان hūriyān ("houris", "virgins of paradise") instead of صوفیان sūfiyān ("Sufis").

According to Arberry, this verse should be taken closely with verse 6, the common theme being the complete submission of the seeker to the will of God.

Three of the manuscripts have an extra verse after verse 5 (or after verse 6). These floating verses are commonly found in the manuscripts of Hafez and are usually considered to be inauthentic. They are, however, included in Gertrude Bell's translation.

The verse is as follows:

ما به صد خرمن پندار ز ره چون نرویم
چون ره آدم بیدار بیک دانه زدند

mā be sad xerman-e pendār ze rah čūn naravīm
čūn rah-ē Ādam-e bīdār be yek dāne zadand

With a hundred harvests of thoughts how come we do not leave the way,
seeing that they diverted the path of Adam, though he was vigilant, with a single grain?

This refers to a tradition that the reason for Adam's fall from Heaven was the eating of a single grain of wheat.

=== Verse 6 ===
The image of the moth burning itself in the candle is a favourite one with Persian poets. Annemarie Schimmel traces the idea back to the 10th/11th century Sufi al-Hallaj of Baghdad, from whose writings it appears that "[The moth] does not want the light or the heat but casts himself into the flame, never to return and never to give any information about the Reality, for he has reached perfection." The phrase "sets fire to the harvest of the moth" refers to the moth's total annihilation in the flame.

In their introduction to this poem Avery and Heath-Stubbs write:

"The angels who created him from Adam's clay placed upon him the covenant of God's love. Therefore he remains steadfast, even though the final goal of love is annihilation."

The same three manuscripts mentioned above add another extra verse after verse 6, namely:

نقطهٔ عشق دل گوشه نشینان خون کرد
همچو آن خال که بر عارض جانانه زدند

noqte-yē 'ešq del-ē gūše-nešīnān xūn kard
hamčo 'ān xāl ke bar 'ārez-e jānāne zadand

The point of love made the heart of contemplatives bleed,
like that mole which they placed on the cheek of the beloved.

== Gertrude Bell's translation ==
The most famous translation of this poem is by Gertrude Lothian Bell, which was published in her anthology Poems from the Divan of Hafiz (1897). E. G. Browne wrote of her translations: "(They) must be reckoned as the most skilful attempt to render accessible to English readers the works of this poet." In his anthology, Fifty Poems of Hafez (1947), A. J. Arberry chose Bell's translation to represent this poem. The Angels Knocking on the Tavern Door, echoing Bell's words, is the title chosen for their anthology of thirty Hafez poems by Robert Bly and Leonard Lewisohn (2008).

Bell's translation is as follows:

Last night I dreamed that angels stood without
The tavern door, and knocked in vain, and wept;
They took the clay of Adam, and, methought,
Moulded a cup therewith while all men slept.
Oh dwellers in the halls of Chastity!
You brought Love's passionate red wine to me,
Down to the dust I am, your bright feet stept.
For Heaven's self was all too weak to bear
The burden of His love God laid on it,
He turned to seek a messenger elsewhere,
And in the Book of Fate my name was writ.
Between my Lord and me such concord lies
As makes the Huris glad in Paradise,
With songs of praise through the green glades they flit.
A hundred dreams of Fancy's garnered store
Assail me Father Adam went astray
Tempted by one poor grain of corn ! Wherefore
Absolve and pardon him that turns away
Though the soft breath of Truth reaches his ears,
For two-and-seventy jangling creeds he hears,
And loud-voiced Fable calls him ceaselessly.
That, that is not the flame of Love's true fire
Which makes the torchlight shadows dance in rings,
But where the radiance draws the moth's desire
And sends him forth with scorched and drooping wings.
The heart of one who dwells retired shall break,
Rememb'ring a black mole and a red cheek.
And his life ebb, sapped at its secret springs.
Yet since the earliest time that man has sought
To comb the locks of Speech, his goodly bride,
Not one, like Hafiz, from the face of Thought
Has torn the veil of Ignorance aside.

== See also ==
There are also articles on the following poems by Hafez on Wikipedia. The number in the edition by Muhammad Qazvini and Qasem Ghani (1941) is given:

- Alā yā ayyoha-s-sāqī – QG 1
- Shirazi Turk – QG 3
- Zolf-'āšofte – QG 26
- Sālhā del – QG 143
- Naqdhā rā bovad āyā – QG 185
- Goftā borūn šodī – QG 406
- Mazra'-ē sabz-e falak – QG 407
- Sīne mālāmāl – QG 470
