= Goftā borūn šodī =

Seven-verse ghazal (love-song) by Hāfez

Goftā borūn šodī is a seven-verse ghazal (love-song) by the 14th-century Persian poet Hāfez. It is no. 406 in the collection of Hafez's ghazals, which are arranged alphabetically by their rhyme, in the edition of Muhammad Qazvini and Qasem Ghani (1941). The poem is interesting because of its Sufic content and certain difficulties of interpretation. It has been compared with the more famous Mazra'-e sabz-e falak for its similarity of themes, and for the light which it may throw on that poem.

In the opening of the poem the speaker (who is not made explicit) sternly criticises Hafez for "going outside" to look at the New Moon. It later appears that this action is equated with abandoning the mystic Way of Love in favour of Reason. In the second half of the poem Hafez is urged to remain faithful to the Way and to heed the advice of the Magian Elder.

== The metre ==
The metre is called mozāre', which is relatively common in Persian lyric poetry. In Elwell-Sutton's system it is classified as 4.7.14. It is found in 75 (14%) of Hafez's 530 poems. In the pattern below, – represents a long syllable, and u a short one:

– – | u – u – | u u – – | u – u –

This is a compound metre, since it uses two kinds of feet (u – u – and u u – –). This kind of compound metre (Elwell-Sutton's fourth pattern) is common in lyric poetry, accounting for some 44% of lyric poems.

In the transcription, "overlong" syllables, which take the place of a long syllable plus a short one, are underlined.

== The poem ==
1
گفتا برون شدی به تماشای ماه نو
از ماه ابروان منت شرم باد رو

goftā borūn šodī be tamāšā-ye māh-e nôw
az māh-e abrovān-e man-at šarm bād, rôw!

S/He said, You have gone outside to the spectacle of the New Moon;
It is the moon of my eyebrows you should be ashamed of! Go!

2
عمریست تا دلت ز اسیران زلف ماست
غافل ز حفظ جانب یاران خود مشو

'omrī-st tā del-at ze asīrān-e zolf-e mā-st
qāfel ze hefz-e jāneb-e yārān-e xod mašow

For a lifetime your heart has been one of the captives of our hair.
Don't become careless of protecting the side of your friends!

3
مفروش عطر عقل به هندوی زلف ما
کان جا هزار نافه مشکین به نیم جو

mafrūš 'etr-e 'aql be hendū-ye zolf-e mā
k-ān jā hezār nāfe-ye moškīn be nīm jow

Do not sell the perfume of Reason for the blackness of our hair!
For there a thousand musk-pods sell at half a barley-corn!

4
تخم وفا و مهر در این کهنه کشته زار
آن گه عیان شود که بود موسم درو

toxm-ē vafā vo mehr dar īn kohne keštezār
ān gah 'eyān šavad ke bovad mowsem-ē derow

The seed of fidelity and love in this old sowing-place
becomes manifest when the season of harvest arrives.

5
ساقی بیار باده که رمزی بگویمت
از سر اختران کهن سیر و ماه نو

sāqī, biyār bāde ke ramz-ī begūyam-at
az serr-e axtarān-e kohan-seyr o māh-e now

Wine-pourer, bring wine so that I can tell you a secret
of the mystery of the ancient-wandering stars and the New Moon.

6
شکل هلال هر سر مه می‌دهد نشان
از افسر سیامک و ترک کلاه زو

šakl-ē helāl har sar-e mah mīdehad nešān
az 'afsar-ē Siyāmak o tark-ē kolāh-e Zow

The shape of the crescent at the beginning of each month gives a sign
of the diadem of Siyamak and the helmet of Zow.

7
حافظ جناب پیر مغان مامن وفاست
درس حدیث عشق بر او خوان و ز او شنو

Hāfez, jenāb-e pīr-e Moqān ma'man-ē vafā-st
dars-ē hadīs-e 'ešq bar ū xān o zū šenow

Hafez, the side of the Magian Elder is the asylum of fidelity.
Recite the lesson of the story of Love to him and hear from him.

== Comments on individual verses ==
=== Verse 1 ===
The person who speaks to Hafez (goftā "he said" is a poetic form of the more usual goft) is not made explicit. Clarke (1891) takes it as the beloved. Bashiri, however, takes it as the Pir or Sufic Elder who is expressing his displeasure with Hafez for abandoning the Sufic Way.

Both this poem and Mazra'-e sabz-e falak open with a verse in which Hafez gazes at the New Moon. In verse 4 of that poem, the Moon is called a "traitor" ('ayyār), presumably for having led Hafez astray.

According to Bashiri, the "moon of my eyebrows", unlike the real moon in the sky, is always unchanging, and represents the unchanging teachings of the Elder.

=== Verse 3 ===
This verse may be compared to verse 7 of Mazra'-e sabz-e falak, which expresses a similar idea:

آسمان گو مفروش این عظمت کاندر عشق
خرمن مه به جوی خوشه پروین به دو جو

āsmān gū maforūš īn 'azamat k-andar 'ešq
xerman-ē mah be jov-ī, xūše-ye Parvīn be do jow

Tell the sky: do not sell this magnificence, since in Love
the Moon's harvest sells for a barley grain, and the Pleiades' ear of corn for two grains.

Musk is a very expensive perfume obtained from the gland of a kind of deer found in northern India and Tibet. Bashiri argues that both verses have the same meaning, namely that the magnificence of the phenomenal world, represented by the Moon and stars, is worthless as a way of achieving union with the Divine, compared with the Way of Love.

The idea that the rational faculty ('aql) can of itself never attain true experiential knowledge of God is common in Sufic writers, for example in the early 12th-century Persian mystic Abo-l-Fazl Rashid-al-Din Meybodi, who greatly influenced Hafez's philosophy.

=== Verse 4 ===
The words keštezār "sown field" and mowsem-ē derow "season of harvest" recall the words kešte "what I have sown" and hangām-ē derow "time of harvest" in verse 1 of the poem Mazra'-e sabz-e falak.

=== Verse 5 ===
On this verse, Bashiri comments: "The call for wine is usually expected to appear in one of the initial bayts of a Sufic ghazal, because when the Murid joins the Path, he needs wine (knowledge) to guide him through the valleys of love," the Murīd being the disciple who is being guided on the path of Love by the Sufic Elder.

=== Verse 6 ===
Siyāmak and Zow are two ancient legendary Iranian kings, mentioned in Ferdowsi's Shahnameh. The idea behind the verse is that the turning heavens sweep away even great kings of the past. In another poem Hafez writes, in Gertrude Bell's translation:

What man can tell where Kaus and Kai have gone?
Who knows where even now the restless wind
Scatters the dust of Djem's imperial throne?

This verse may be compared with verse 4 of Mazra'-e sabz-e falak, which in a similar way mentions two ancient Iranian kings in connection with the Moon:

تکیه بر اختر شب دزد مکن کاین عیار
تاج کاووس ببرد و کمر کیخسرو

takye bar axtar-e šab-dozd makon, k-īn 'ayyār
tāj-e Kāvūs bebord ō kamar-ē Key Xosrow

Do not rely on the night-thief star, since this traitor
stole Kavus' crown and the belt of Kay Khosrow.

Comparing the two poems, it is clear that the "night-thief star" is the crescent Moon.

Despite the mention of the New Moon in the previous verse, Clarke (1891) translates har sar-e mah as "the end of every month" and assumes the crescent refers to the waning crescent moon. However, the normal meaning of sar-e mah is the beginning of the month, and this interpretation is followed by Bashiri. Clarke also translates tark as "abandoning"; however, the word is normally taken in its other meaning of "helmet".

=== Verse 7 ===
The "Magian Elder" (i.e. Zoroastrian wine-seller) is a frequent figure in Hafez's poetry and generally stands symbolically for the Sufic Elder, dispensing advice and true wisdom. "Hafez brings problems encountered along the spiritual path to the Magian elder, who solves them by gazing in the crystal wine goblet".

The words dars-ē hadīs-e 'ešq bar ū xān "sing the lesson of the story of love to him" recall the similar words of verse 8 of Shirazi Turk:

حدیث از مطرب و می گو و راز دهر کمتر جو
که کس نگشود و نگشاید به حکمت این معما را

hadīs az motreb-ō mey gū * vo rāz-ē dahr kamtar jū
ke kas nagšūd o nagšāyad * be hekmat 'īn mo'ammā-rā

Tell a tale of minstrel and wine, and seek the secret of time less,
since no one has ever solved or will ever solve this riddle with reason.

The general theme of both poems is that Love, not Religion or Philosophy, will solve the problems of the world and guide the seeker on his spiritual path.

== Other Hafez poems ==
There are articles on the following poems by Hafez on Wikipedia. The number in the edition by Muhammad Qazvini and Qasem Ghani (1941) is given:

- Alā yā ayyoha-s-sāqī – QG 1
- Shirazi Turk – QG 3
- Zolf-'āšofte – QG 26
- Sālhā del – QG 143
- Dūš dīdam ke malā'ek – QG 184
- Naqdhā rā bovad āyā – QG 185
- Mazra'-ē sabz-e falak – QG 407
- Sīne mālāmāl – QG 470
