= Sīne mālāmāl-e dard ast =

14th-century poem by Hafez

Sīne mālāmāl-e dard ast ("My heart is brimful of pain") is a nine-verse ghazal (love-song) by the 14th-century Persian poet Hafez of Shiraz. It is no. 470 in the edition by Muhammad Qazvini and Qasem Ghani (1941) and 461 in the edition of Parviz Natel-Khanlari (1983). In this poem, Hafez describes the torments of his desire for love and calls for wine to assuage his pain. In verses 3 and 5–7, a spiritual adviser reminds Hafez that such torments are a necessary stage on the path of love.

The ode has aroused the interest of commentators because of its clearly Sufic language, and has been compared with the more famous Shirazi Turk ghazal (no. 3 in the collection) for the light which it may throw on the interpretation of that poem. The mention of the "Samarkandi Turk" in this ode (a possible reference to the conqueror Tamerlane) has also been debated by scholars.

== The poem ==
The text given below is that of Muhammad Qazvini and Qasem Ghani (1941), which is the one most often quoted. Different manuscripts have different textual variants, however. One of the most important of these variations is that verse 8 in some manuscripts is found after verse 2; there are also a number of different variations of that verse itself (see below).

Literal translations of the poem can be found in Clarke (1891), vol 2, p. 885, and in Bashiri (1979).

For various recitations of the poem, see External links below.

1
سینه مالامال درد است ای دریغا مرهمی
دل ز تنهایی به جان آمد خدا را همدمی

sīne mālāmāl-e dard ast; ey deriqā, marham-ī
del ze tanhā'ī be jān āmad, Xodā-rā, hamdam-ī

My breast is brimful of pain; alas, a remedy!
My heart is dying of loneliness, for God's sake, (send) a companion!

2
چشم آسایش که دارد از سپهر تیزرو
ساقیا جامی به من ده تا بیاسایم دمی

čašm-e 'āsāyeš ke dārad 'az sepehr-ē tīz-row?
sāqeyā, jām-ī be man deh tā biyāsāyam dam-ī

Whose eyes get rest from the fast-moving heaven?
O cup-bearer, give me a cup, so that I may rest a moment!

3
زیرکی را گفتم این احوال بین خندید و گفت
صعب روزی بوالعجب کاری پریشان عالمی

zīrak-ī-rā goftam īn ahwāl bīn; xandīd o goft
sa'b rūz-ī, bu-l-'ajab kār-ī, parīšān 'ālam-ī

I said to a wise one, "Look at these conditions!" He laughed and said,
"A difficult day, a strange affair, a perplexing world!"

4
سوختم در چاه صبر از بهر آن شمع چگل
شاه ترکان فارغ است از حال ما کو رستمی

sūxtam dar čāh-e sabr az bahr-e 'ān šam'-ē Čegel
šāh-e Torkān fāreq ast az hāl-e mā, kū Rostam-ī?

I burnt in the well of patience on account of that candle of Chegel;
the king of the Turks cares not for my condition, where is a Rostam?

5
در طریق عشقبازی امن و آسایش بلاست
ریش باد آن دل که با درد تو خواهد مرهمی

dar tarīq-ē 'ešq-bāzī amn o āsāyeš balā-st
rīš bād ān del ke bā dard-ē to xāhad marham-ī

In the path of love, security and rest is a calamity!
may that heart be wounded which, having your pain, seeks a remedy.

6
اهل کام و ناز را در کوی رندی راه نیست
رهروی باید جهان سوزی نه خامی بی‌غمی

ahl-e kām ō nāz-rā dar kūy-e rendī rāh nīst
rahrov-ī bāyad jahān-sūz-ī na xām-ī bī-qam-ī

There is no entry in the street of libertinism for mere pleasure-seekers;
a traveller is necessary, one who burns up the world, not a raw one without grief.

7
آدمی در عالم خاکی نمی‌آید به دست
عالمی دیگر بباید ساخت و از نو آدمی

ādamī dar 'ālam-ē xākī nemīyāyad be dast
'ālam-ī dīgar bebāyad sāxt v-az now Ādam-ī

In the world of dust, no human being comes to hand;
it is necessary to build another world, and to make Adam anew.

8
خیز تا خاطر بدان ترک سمرقندی دهیم
کز نسیمش بوی جوی مولیان آید همی

xīz tā xāter bedān Tork-ē Samarqandī dehīm
k-az nasīm-aš būy-e jūy-ē Mūliyān āyad hamī

Rise, so that we may give our devotion to that Samarkandi Turk,
since from his breeze, the fragrance of the river Muliyan keeps coming.

9
گریه حافظ چه سنجد پیش استغنای عشق
کاندر این دریا نماید هفت دریا شبنمی

gerye-yē Hāfez če sanjad pīš-e 'esteqnā-ye 'ešq
k-andar īn daryā namāyad haft daryā šabnam-ī

What do Hafez's tears weigh beside the abundance of Love?
since in this sea, the Seven Seas appear as but a little night-dew.

== The metre ==
The metre is known as ramal, based on the pattern fā'ilātun, fā'ilātun, fā'ilātun, fā'ilun; it is a catalectic line, since the 4th foot of the pattern is shortened by one syllable. In Elwell-Sutton's classification, this metre is classified as 2.4.15. It is used in 39 of Hafez's 530 poems. Here "–" indicates a long, and "u" a short syllable in the metre.

| – u – – | – u – – | – u – – | – u – |

The 11-syllable version of this metre, following its use in Attar's Manteqo-t-Teyr (Conference of the Birds) (12th century) and Rumi's Mystical Masnavi (13th century), became one of the standard metres of mystical poetry in Persian.

| – u – – | – u – – | – u – |

In the transcription above, "overlong" syllables, which take the place of a long + a short syllable in the metre, are underlined.

There is a similarity between the 15-syllable form of this metre and the trochaic tetrameter catalectic of Latin and Greek poetry.

== A Sufic poem ==
"The discussion on the question whether Ḥāfeẓ wrote mystical or secular poetry has never ended" (de Bruijn (2000)). Works such as the translation of Hafez by H. Wilberforce Clarke (1891), in which every line is interpreted as having a mystical or allegorical meaning, are regarded with disfavour today.

However, for some scholars at least, Sine malamal cannot be understood except in terms of Sufism. In an article comparing this poem with the better-known Shirazi Turk ode, Iraj Bashiri (1979) argues that both poems describe the five stages in the path of Love, in Sufic tradition: loss of heart (foqdān-e del), regret (ta'assof), ecstasy (wajd), loss of patience (bīsabrī), and the ardour of love (sabābat or loss of consciousness bīhūshī). The true devotee who follows this path sacrifices himself and becomes annihilated in the Godhead.

There are themes in common between the two poems. In both, the poet calls for wine to soothe the pain of his love-sickness; in both, an elder advises Hafez that the world is too perplexing to understand; in both, the poet describes his lack of patience (sabr) and complains that the beloved pays no attention to his condition. However, in the second half of the poems the correspondence in themes is less obvious.

== Notes on individual verses ==
=== Verse 4 ===
In verse 4, "I burnt in the well of patience" is a reference to the story of Bijan and Manijeh in Ferdowsi's epic poem, the Shahnameh. The young warrior, Bijan, falls in love with a princess, Manijeh, but her father, Afrasiyab, the king of the Turanians, imprisons him in a well. Later he is rescued from the well by his grandfather, Rostam.

The same story is alluded to in ghazal 345, verse 5:

شاه ترکان چو پسندید و به چاهم انداخت
دستگیر ار نشود لطف تهمتن چه کنم

šāh-e Torkān čo pasandīd o be čāh-am 'andāxt
dast-gīr ar našavad lotf-e Tahamtan, če konam?

Since it pleased the king of the Turks to throw me into a well,
if the favour of Tahamtan (= Rostam) doesn't come to my aid, what am I to do?

The story is also referred to in the narrative poem Ilāhī-Nāma or Elāhī-Nāme of the 12th/13th-century Sufi poet Attar of Nishapur, who gives it an allegorical interpretation. Attar explains that the situation of Bijan refers to the journey of the soul as it overcomes the evil forces within itself and travels from the sensual world to the spiritual one. Rostam represents the spiritual guide (pīr) who will help the troubled soul. He advises:

ترا پس رستمی باید درین راه ٭ که این سنگ گران بر گیرد از چاه
ترا زین چاهِ ظلمانی برآرد ٭ بخلوتگاهِ روحانی درآرد
ز ترکستان پُر مکر طبیعت ٭ کند رویت بایران شریعت
بر کیخسرو روحت دهد راه ٭ نهد جام جمت بر دست آنگاه
که تا زان جام یک یک ذرّه جاوید ٭ برأی العین می‌بینی چوخورشید

to-rā pas Rostam-ī bāyad dar īn rāh
ke īn sang-ē gerān bar-gīrad az čāh
to-rā z-īn čāh-e zolmānī bar-ārad
be xalvatgāh-e rūhānī dar-ārad
ze Torkestān-e por-makr-ē tabī'at
konad rūy-at be Īrān-ē šarī'at
bar-ē Key Xosrov-ē rūh-at dehad rāh
nehad jām-ē Jam-at bar dast 'āngāh
ke tā z-ān jām yek-yek zarre jāvīd
be-ra'yo-l-'eyn mībīnī čo xoršīd

Therefore thou needst a Rostam to come this way and lift this heavy stone from the well,
Raise thee up from this dark well and bring thee into the spiritual retreat,
Turn thy face from the deceitful Turkestan of nature towards the Iran of the Holy Law,
Guide thee to the Kay Khosrow of the soul and then place in thy hand the goblet of Jamshid,
In order that in that goblet thou mayst see for ever with thy own eyes every single atom as clear as the sun."

Chegel is the name of a Turkish people in Central Asia known in Persian poetry for the extraordinary beauty of their youths. The image of a candle to which a moth is drawn is another familiar metaphor of Persian poetry; so the "candle of Chegel" refers to a beautiful youth.

Immediately after describing his loss of patience, Hafez complains that the "King of the Turks" is paying no attention to his state. Bashiri interprets this phrase as referring to the Beloved. The corresponding verse in Shirazi Turk similarly describes the yār ("Beloved") as having no need for Hafez's imperfect love.

=== Verse 5 ===
The remainder of the verses of the poem are addressed to Hafez, and evidently continue the advice and encouragement to him by the spiritual guide.

=== Verse 6 ===
In verse 6, the word rendī ("libertinism") is the abstract noun derived from rend. In his essay "Hafez and rendi", Franklin Lewis writes:

"Rend, variously translated in English as “rake, ruffian, pious rogue, brigand, libertine, lout, debauchee,” etc., is the very antithesis of establishment propriety. The word originally signified something like a thug or mercenary gangster, and during the era of Hafez neighborhood warlords in Shiraz, commanding local urban militias of ronud (pl. of rend), played an influential role in stabilizing or destabilizing the ruler."

In Hafez's poetry the rend is always mentioned in an approving way. It is a person who "may lack the piety of the piety-minded but is nevertheless more rightly-guided than they" (Lewis). He represents the opposite of those figures that Hafez despises, the hypocritical preacher, the judge, and the sham Sufi.

As with other aspects of Hafez's poetry, it has been debated how far Hafez should be taken as literally praising a life of hedonism and wine-drinking, and how far his statements about wine, sin, music and pleasure are to be interpreted in a metaphorical or mystic sense.

=== Verse 8 ===
Some editions (including that of Parviz Natel-Khanlari) place this verse after verse 2.

In this verse some scholars have suggested that the Samarkandi Turk is a reference to the conqueror Tamerlane, whose capital was established at Samarkand in 1370. If taken literally, it would refer to the hope that Tamerlane would spare Shiraz on the occasion of his first invasion of Iran in 1387. Others take it in a metaphorical sense, referring to the Beloved.

Another problem with the line is deciding what exactly Hafez wrote, since the manuscripts have various versions; it is also possible that Hafez himself changed the words to reflect changed circumstances, as he appears to have done in another ghazal, no. 440 (= 431 in Natel-Khanlari's edition).

In the form which it comes here, the phrase būy-e jūy-ē Mūliyān āyad hamī is a direct quotation from the opening of a famous poem by the 9th/10th century poet Rudaki. However, this variant is only found in two out of 24 manuscripts which, according to Ingenito, "are not philologically more relevant than the rest of the manuscript tradition". There are in fact 12 variants of this line in the manuscripts. 11 of the manuscripts contain the word xūn "blood" instead of jūy "stream", making it possible that the line originally read either:

کز لبانش بوی خون عاشقان آید همی

k-az labān-aš būy-e xūn-ē 'āšeqān āyad hamī

"since from his lips the smell of the blood of lovers comes continually"

or:

کز نسیمش بوی خون مولیان آید همی

k-az nasīm-aš būy-e xūn-ē Mūliyān āyad hamī

"since from his breeze the smell of the blood of the Muliyan comes continually"

If the "Samarkandi Turk" refers to Tamerlane, in Ingenito's view, Hafez is here complaining of the bloodshed of his conquests in the north, particularly his devastation of Khwarazm in 1379. Ingenito draws a parallel with another ghazal where, according to a 15th-century commentator, Hafez made a change as a result of Tamerlane's conquest of Khwarazm. According to this commentator, the original last verse in that poem was as follows:

به شعر حافظ شیراز می‌رقصند و می‌نازند
سیه‌چشمان کشمیری و ترکان سمرقندی

be še'r-ē Hāfez-ē Šīrāz mīraqsand o mīnāzand
siah-česmān-e Kašmīrī vo Torkān-ē Samarqandī

"To the poetry of Hafez of Shiraz dance and play the coquette
the Kashmiri dark-eyed ones and the Samarkandi Turks."

But fourteen of the 33 oldest manuscripts have a different version of this verse:

به خوبان دل نده حافظ ، ببین آن بی وفایی ها
که با خوارزمیان کردند، ترکان سمرقندی

be xūbān del madeh, Hāfez! bebīn ān bī-vafā'īhā
ke bā Xārazmiān kardand Torkān-ē Samarqandī

"Do not give your heart to beautiful ones, Hafez! See those infidelities (violence)
that the Samarkandi Turks did to the Khwarazmians!"

It has been suggested therefore that the line was rewritten to account for the changed political situation.

However, not all commentators see a reference to Tamerlane here. For Bashiri, the Samarkandi Turk is simply another expression for the Beloved and the reference to blood refers to the sacrifice that takes place before the seeker is united with God.

If the variant where this verse is placed after verse 2 is correct, the words īn ahwāl bīn "see these conditions" would naturally refer to the political situation described. Otherwise they refer to Hafez's love-sick state of mind.

The phrase xāter dehīm is variously translated: "Let us give our heart to" (Clarke); "Let us preoccupy ourselves with" (Bashiri); "Let us offer our devotion to" (Ingenito); and others are possible.

=== Verse 9 ===
In the 9th verse, the Arabic word esteqnā (استغنا) "detachment, self-sufficiency, independence, abundance", describing the vastness of God's love, has a special meaning in Sufism. In Attar's mystical allegorical poem Manteqo-t-Teyr (Conference of the Birds), completed in 1177, the Valley of Detachment (وادی استغنا vādi-ye esteqnā) is the fourth of the seven valleys that the birds must pass through in their mystic quest for union with God.

Hafez's statement that, compared with the sea of God's love, the Seven Seas appear but a drop of dew recalls Attar's description of the Valley of Detachment in that poem:

هفت دریا یک شمر اینجا بود
هفت اخگر یک شرر اینجا بود

haft daryā yek šamar 'īnjā bovad
haft 'axgar yek šarar 'īnjā bovad

"Here (in the Valley of Detachment) the Seven Seas are but a small pool;
Here the Seven Pits of Hell are but a spark."

Instead of esteqnā-ye 'ešq "the self-sufficiency of (God's) love" in this verse, some manuscripts have esteqnā-ye dūst "the self-sufficiency of the Beloved". In the Shirazi Turk poem, the adjectival form mostaqnī "self-sufficient" is used to describe the indifference of the Beloved to Hafez's imperfect love.

== Other Hafez poems ==
There are articles on the following poems by Hafez on Wikipedia. The number in the edition by Muhammad Qazvini and Qasem Ghani (1941) is given:

- Alā yā ayyoha-s-sāqī – QG 1
- Shirazi Turk – QG 3
- Zolf-'āšofte – QG 26
- Sālhā del – QG 143
- Dūš dīdam ke malā'ek – QG 184
- Naqdhā rā bovad āyā – QG 185
- Goftā borūn šodī – QG 406
- Mazra'-ē sabz-e falak – QG 407
