= Shirazi Turk =

14th-century poem by Hafez

Shirazi Turk is a ghazal (love poem) by the 14th-century Persian poet, Hāfez of Shiraz. It has been described as "the most familiar of Hafez's poems in the English-speaking world". It was the first poem of Hafez to appear in English, when William Jones made his paraphrase "A Persian Song" in 1771, based on a Latin version supplied by his friend Károly Reviczky. Edward Granville Browne wrote of this poem: "I cannot find so many English verse-renderings of any other of the odes of Ḥafiẓ." It is the third poem in the collection (The Divān of Hafez) of Hafez's poems, which are arranged alphabetically by their rhymes.

In the century after Hafez's death, a famous anecdote was told on how the Turco-Mongol conqueror Timur (Tamerlane) met Hafez and criticized him for writing so disrespectfully of Bokhara and Samarkand in this poem. This story first appears in a work called Anis al-Nas by Shoja' Shirazi (1426), and it was elaborated on in a collection of biographies of poets (Tazkerāt aš-Šo'arā) completed in 1486 by Dawlatshah Samarqandi.

It has been argued that the poem is likely to have been written after 1370, when Tamerlane began to develop Samarkand and make it famous as his capital. If so, it was probably written later in Hafez's life, since in 1370, he would've been somewhere between 53 and 55 years old.

== The poem ==
The transliteration given here is based on that approved by the United Nations in 2012, which represents the current pronunciation of educated speakers in Iran, except that to make scansion easier, the long vowels are marked with a macron (ā, ē, ī, ō, ū). (See Romanization of Persian.) The glottal stop is written ('), and kh (as in "Khayyām") is written x.

Prose translations of the poem can be found in Clarke (1891), pp. 40–43, Windfuhr (1990), Hillmann (1995), and Ingenito (2018). A number of poetic versions are quoted in part or in full by Arberry (1946).

The Persian text of the poem, and recordings in Persian, are available on the Ganjoor website.

1
اگر آن ترک شیرازی به دست آرد دل ما را
به خال هندویش بخشم سمرقند و بخارا را

'agar 'ān Tork-e Šīrāzī * be dast ārad del-ē mā-rā
be xāl-ē Hendu-yaš baxšam * Samarqand ō Boxārā-rā

If that Shirazi Turk accepts my heart in their hand,
for their Indian mole I will give Samarkand and Bukhara.

2
بده ساقی می باقی که در جنت نخواهی یافت
کنار آب رکن آباد و گلگشت مصلا را

bedeh, sāqī, mey-ē bāqī * ke dar jannat naxāhī yāft
kenār-ē āb-e Roknābād * o golgašt-ē Mosallā-rā

Wine-pourer, give the rest of wine, since in heaven you will not find
the banks of the water of Roknabad and the rose-walk of Mosalla.

3
فغان کاین لولیان شوخ شیرین کار شهرآشوب
چنان بردند صبر از دل که ترکان خوان یغما را

faqān k-īn lūliyān-ē šūx * -e šīrīnkār-e šahrāšūb
čonān bordānd sabr az del * ke Torkān xān-e yaqmā-rā

Alas for these mischievous gypsies who do sweet things and make the town riot!
they have stolen the patience from my heart like Turks at a banquet of plunder.

4
ز عشق ناتمام ما جمال یار مستغنی است
به آب و رنگ و خال و خط چه حاجت روی زیبا را

ze 'ešq-ē nātamām-ē mā * jamāl-ē yār mostaqnī-st
be āb ō rang o xāl ō xat * če hājat rūy-e zībā-rā?

Of our imperfect love the glory of the beloved is independent;
what need does a beautiful face have for powder and colour and mole and line?

5
من از آن حسن روزافزون که یوسف داشت دانستم
که عشق از پرده عصمت برون آرد زلیخا را

man az 'ān hosn-e rūz-afzūn * ke Yūsof dāšt dānestam
ke 'ešq az parde-yē 'esmat * borūn ārad Zoleyxā-rā

I have learnt, from that daily-increasing beauty that Joseph had,
that Love will bring Zoleykha out from behind the curtain of modesty.

6
اگر دشنام فرمایی و گر نفرین دعا گویم
جواب تلخ می‌زیبد لب لعل شکرخا را

agar došnām farmā'ī * v-agar nefrīn do'ā gūyam
javāb-ē talx mīzībad * lab-ē la'l-ē šekarxā-rā

Even if you speak harshly, and even if you curse me, I am grateful;
a bitter answer beautifies a ruby-red sugar-chewing lip.

7
نصیحت گوش کن جانا که از جان دوست‌تر دارند
جوانان سعادتمند پند پیر دانا را

nasīhat gūš kon, jānā, * ke 'az jān dūst-tar dārand
javānān-ē sa'ādatmand * pand-ē pīr-e dānā-rā

Listen to advice, my soul, since even more valuable than their soul
youths who seek happiness hold the advice of a knowledgeable elder.

8
حدیث از مطرب و می گو و راز دهر کمتر جو
که کس نگشود و نگشاید به حکمت این معما را

hadīs az motreb-ō mey gū * vo rāz-ē dahr kamtar jū
ke kas nagšūd o nagšāyad * be hekmat 'īn mo'ammā-rā

Tell a tale of minstrel and wine, and seek the secret of time less,
since no one has ever solved or will ever solve this riddle with wisdom.

9
غزل گفتی و در سفتی بیا و خوش بخوان حافظ
که بر نظم تو افشاند فلک عقد ثریا را

qazal goftī o dor softī * biyā vō xoš bexān, Hāfez
ke bar nazm-ē to afšānad * falak 'egd-ē Sorayyā-rā

You have completed your poem and pierced the pearl; come and sing beautifully, Hafez,
that on your compositions Heaven may scatter the necklace of the Pleiades.

== Metre ==
The metre is known as hazaj. Each bayt or verse is made of four sections of eight syllables each. In Elwell-Sutton's system, this metre is classified as 2.1.16, and it is used in 25 (4.7%) of Hafez's 530 poems.

| u – – – | u – – – || u – – – | u – – – |

"Overlong" syllables, which take up the place of a long plus a short syllable in the metre, are underlined.

== The text ==
The text of the poem is not entirely certain. The version given above is that of Muhammad Qazvini and Qasem Ghani (1941). However, of ten manuscripts examined by Mas'ud Farzaad, in fact only two have the above text.

Nine of the ten manuscripts agree on the order of verses 1–5 and 9. But concerning verses 6–8 there is more disagreement. One manuscript has the order 1, 2, 7, 6, 3, 9, omitting 4, 5 and 8. Another manuscript omits verses 6 and 7. In the other manuscripts verses 6, 7, and 8 are found in various orders: 7, 8, 6; 8, 7, 6; and 6, 8, 7.

Bashiri (1979) argued that verses 6 and 7 are interpolations, and Rehder (1974) suggested that one or both of verses 4 and 8 might be spurious.

Eight of the manuscripts have a different version of verse 6 (see below).

== Sufic interpretation ==
The practice of Sufism (Islamic mysticism) was widespread in Iran during these centuries and greatly influenced Persian poetry. However, how far this poem of Hafez is to be taken in a mystical sense is disputed. One of those who interpreted it mystically is Clarke (1895), who explains that the Turk symbolises God, Samarkand and Bukhara signify this world and the next, the wine is the mysteries of love, and so on.

However, not all scholars see a mystical interpretation in this poem. Gertrude Bell, for example, in her Poems from the Divan of Hafiz (1897), p. 129, wrote:

"The whole poem has received a mystical interpretation which seems to me to add but little to its value or to its intelligibility."

E. G. Browne in volume 3 of his Literary History of Persia wrote:

"That many of the odes are to be taken in symbolic and mystical sense, few will deny; that others mean what they say, and celebrate a beauty not celestial and a wine not allegorical can hardly be questioned."

Similarly in the 16th century, the Turkish commentator on Hafez, Ahmed Sudi, adopted a literal approach to Hafez's poetry, rejecting the excessively mystical interpretations of his predecessors Süruri and Şemʿi.

The ruler of Shiraz in Hafez's time, Shah Shoja', also found both aspects, spiritual and worldly, in Hafez's poems. He is said to have complained that Hafez's poetry was "at one moment mystical, at another erotic and bacchanalian; now serious and spiritual, and again flippant and worldly". Many modern commentators agree with Browne and Bell, and the majority accept the ode at its face value.

Iraj Bashiri on the other hand argues strongly for a Sufic interpretation of this poem. He compares this poem with another of Hafez's ghazals, Sīne mālāmāl ("My heart is brimful of pain"), which is more obviously Sufic in character. According to Bashiri, both poems describe the seven stages of Love an initiate must go through to achieve union with the Divine (loss of heart, regret, ecstasy, loss of patience, loss of consciousness, loss of mind, annihilation).

Bashiri also draws attention to certain apparent astronomical references: the Sun (which was sometimes known as Tork-e falak "the Turk of the firmament"), Saturn (sometimes referred to as Hendū-ye čarx "the Indian of the sky"), Venus and other bright planets (Lūlīyān), the seven planets (Torkan), the Pleiades (Sorayyā), and the firmament itself (falak), all of which can be given Sufic meanings. His interpretation is at odds with that of Hillmann, who dismisses Bashiri's article as unscholarly.

However, even Hillmann acknowledges that in this poem there is a certain ambivalence – the ambiguity or īhām for which Hafez is famous. "The allusion to Joseph and Zulaykha may seem to some to be wholly in the spiritual area of the spectrum, whereas the minstrel-and-wine image in bayt 8 and the self-praise in bayt 9 perhaps can be taken only as part of the physical world." The question of the intent of the poem therefore is open to interpretation, some scholars taking it wholly as a physical description of love, others like Arberry as a "grand philosophical utterance".

== Gender of the Turk ==
Whether the Turk is male or female is not expressed grammatically in Persian. Many of the earliest translators of this poem all translated it as though the Turk were female, beginning with William Jones, whose version begins: "Sweet maid, if thou wouldst charm my sight...". Herman Bicknell (1875) is an exception, writing "If that Shirâzian Turk would deign to take my heart within his hand, To make his Indian mole my own, I'd give Bokhára and Samarḳand."

In fact, although in the great Persian narrative epics and romances the love interest was always female, there was also a long tradition of love poetry in both Arabic and Persian in which, in the great majority of cases, the person whose beauty was praised was male. Among the Persian poets who wrote love poems of this kind were Farrokhi (11th century), Manuchehri (11th century), Sanai (12th century), Anvari (12th century), Iraqi (13th century), Saadi (13th century) and Awhadi (14th century). Often the object of the poet's admiration was described as a "Turk" (Turks were supposed to be especially good-looking), as in the couplet below from a qasida of Manuchehri (see The Turkish harpist (Manuchehri)):

بینی آن ترکی که او چون برزند بر چنگ، چنگ
از دل ابدال بگریزد به صد فرسنگ، سنگ

bīni ān Tork-ī ke ū čon barzanad bar čang čang
az del-ē abdāl begrīzad be sad farsang sang
Do you see that Turk, who when he places his hand (čang) on the harp (čang),
from the heart of devotees, a stone flees for a hundred leagues?

Saadi, who like Hafez was from Shiraz, used the phrase "Shirazi Turk" a century before Hafez:

ز دست ترک ختایی کسی جفا چندان
نمی‌برد که من از دست ترک شیرازی

ze dast-e Tork-e Xatā'ī * kas-ī jafā čandān
nemībarad ke man az dast * -e Tork-e Šīrāzī
From a Turk of Khitai no one ever receives so much violence
as I do from the hand of the Shirazi Turk!

Khwaju Kermani, another poet resident in Shiraz a generation before Hafez, wrote:

شیراز ترکستان شده کان بت ز فرخار آمده
Šīrāz Torkestān šode * k-ān bot ze Farxār āmade
Shiraz has become Turkistan * since that "Buddha" has come from Farkhar!

In poems of the early part of the period the object of the poet's love was often a soldier; later he became any kind of adolescent youth, but military metaphors continued to be used to describe the effect his beauty had on the poet.

Most modern scholars are therefore in agreement that Hafez's "Shirazi Turk" was male. However, there are some exceptions. Leonard Lewisohn, with reference to the Beloved, writes: "Gender is always ambiguous in Persian, but in Hafiz's verse the Witness is nearly always female".

Another question is whether the Turk in this poem was really Turkish, and a real person, or simply a poetic invention. The 16th-century Bosnian-Turkish commentator on Hafez, Ahmed Sudi wrote:

"Turk: the word originally means the Tatar people. Since Tatars are known as cruel, merciless and bloody people, Persian poets metaphorically compare their beloveds to them. And this is why these poets call their beloveds 'Turks'."

But Sudi also reports another theory:

"Some people from Shiraz say that many soldiers in [the Mongol ruler] Hulagu's army made the city of Shiraz their home and lived there for successive generations. So, literally speaking, it is not incorrect to call their descendants 'Turks of Shiraz'."

A suggestion by Hafez's editor Qasem Ghani that the Turk might have been the son of Shah Shoja', one of the rulers of the time, is dismissed as "improbable" by Hillmann since "Turk" usually simply means "beloved" and that the phrase had already been used by Saadi.

== Notes on individual verses ==
Arberry (1946) points out that most of the features of this ode are traditional stock motifs from Persian love poetry, and he quotes some lines of Saadi where the same themes recur.

=== Verse 1 ===
The xāl-e Hendū ("mole of an Indian" i.e. dark in colour) was regarded as a symbol of beauty on the face of the beloved. The phrase also appears in a ghazal of Saadi, quoted by Arberry, in which Saadi contrasts the darkness of the mole with the paleness of the beloved's face:

غریبی سخت محبوب اوفتاده‌ست
به ترکستان رویش خال هندو

qarīb-ī saxt mahbūb ūftāda-st
be Torkestān-e rūy-aš xāl-e Hendū

"A very beloved foreigner has fallen
on the Turkestan (i.e. paleness) of his face – a (dark) Indian mole."

=== Verse 2 ===
The internal rhyme in the first half of this verse (bedeh, sāqī, mey-ē bāqī) is similar to the internal rhyme in the Arabic poem which Hafez quotes in ghazal no. 1), which has bi-taryāqi wa-lā rāqī "neither remedy nor enchanter". There is another internal rhyme in verse 9 of this poem: qazal goftī o dor softī. Whenever such internal rhymes occur, they almost always coincide with the end of a metrical foot (see Persian metres#Internal rhyme).

=== Verse 3 ===
Concerning the xān-e yaqmā ("table, or food-cloth, of plunder"), Herman Bicknell explains: "In Turkistán, if we may believe tradition, there was formerly a military institution called the "Feast of Plunder," at which the soldiers, when their pay-day came, violently carried off dishes of rice, and other dishes placed upon the ground. They were thus reminded that rapine and plunder were their lawful pursuits."

The idea behind this line is that the "Turk" (beloved) plunders the heart of the poet, as in this verse of Saadi:

تو همچنان دل شهری به غمزه‌ای ببری
که بندگان بنی سعد خوان یغما را

to hamčenān del-e šahr-ī be qamze-'ī bebarī
ke bandegān-e banī Sa'd xān-e yaqmā-rā

You carry off the heart of a city with a coquettish glance in just the same way
as the slaves of the Banu Sa'd carried off the "banquet of plunder".

=== Verse 4 ===
The idea that a beautiful face has no need for cosmetics or jewellery is contained in the following verse of Saadi:

حاجت گوش و گردنت نیست به زر و زیوری
یا به خضاب و سرمه‌ای یا به عبیر و عنبری

hājat-e gūš o gardan-at * nīst be zarr o zīvar-ī
yā be xezāb o sorme-'ī * yā be 'abīr o 'ambar-ī

Your ear and neck have no need for gold and adornments;
or for colouring and kohl, or for perfume and ambergris.

The translator Herman Bicknell, who spent some months in Shiraz in 1868, points out that the word آب ("ab"), besides signifying "water", is applied to powder for the complexion. "Of this powder two sorts are sold at Shíráz, one our pearl-powder, the other rouge. They are respectively named سفید آب and سرخ آب ("safíd áb" and "sorkh áb")" (literally, "white water" and "red water"). He also reports that women in Persia in his day made artificial moles or beauty spots, either permanent by tattooing them, or temporary ones.

Hillmann translates xat ("line") as "eye-liner (peach-fuzz?)" and Windfuhr as "eyeline". However, the normal meaning of xat(t) ("line") in Persian love poetry is the line of the growing moustache which adorns an adolescent boy's lip. If so, it would refer to an actual physical feature of the face rather than to make-up. The phrase xāl o xatt (or xatt o xāl) is frequent in the poets, as in the following line of Hafez:

فریاد که از شش جهتم راه ببستند
آن خال و خط و زلف و رخ و عارض و قامت

faryād ke 'az šeš jahat-am rāh bebastand
ān xāl o xat ō zolf o rox ō 'ārez o qāmat

Alas! for they have blocked my way from six directions:
that mole and down, and hair and face, and cheek and stature.

=== Verse 5 ===
In verse 5, reference is made to the Qur'anic/Biblical story of Joseph and Potiphar's wife, who in Islamic tradition is called Zulaykhā. Those who interpret this poem non-mystically do not give a satisfactory motivation for this verse. However, in Sufism, the story was widely used as an example. John Renard writes:

"Sufi poets developed the character's personality well beyond the scriptural stories, understanding her as a type of the lover of God who loses her wits in the presence of the divine Beauty. Major poets, including Jami and Rumi, for example, depict her most sympathetically as a "model" of the mystical seeker. They emphasise especially that Zulaykhā was not culpable for her attempted seduction of Joseph, for she was hopelessly under the spell of bewilderment."

=== Verse 6 ===
Eight of the manuscripts have a different version of verse 6, namely:

بدم گفتی و خرسندم عفاک الله کرم کردی
کلام تلخ می زیبد لب لعل شکر خا را

bad-am goftī o xorsand-am; * 'afākallāh karam kardī!
kalām-ē talx mīzībad * lab-ē la'l-ē šekarxā-rā

"You spoke harshly to me and I am pleased; God bless you, you did me a kindness!
bitter speech beautifies a ruby-coloured sugar-chewing lip."

The first of these two lines is a quotation from a ghazal of Saadi.

=== Verse 8 ===
The word hekmat means "wisdom, science, knowledge, philosophy". It is a frequent theme of other Hafez poems that it is love ('ešq), not reason or intellect ('aql), which helps the seeker on his spiritual journey and provides the answer to the riddle of life in a perplexing world.

The phrase 'eqd-e sorayyā "the necklace of Sorayya (the Pleiades)" occurs in earlier Persian poets also. A well-known instance is in the rhymed prose in the introduction to Saadi's Golestān:

شب را به بوستان با یکی از دوستان اتفاق مبیت افتاد موضعی خوش و خرّم و درختان درهم گفتی که خرده مینا بر خاکش ریخته و عقد ثریا از تاکش (تارکش) آویخته (درآویخته)

šab rā be būstān bā yek-ī az dūstān ettefāq mabīt oftād, mowze'-ī xoš o xorram o deraxtān dar ham, goftī ke xorde-ye mīnā bar xāk-aš rīxte vo 'eqd-e sorayyā az tāk-aš āvīxte

"That evening with one of my friends I happened to spend the night in an orchard, a pleasant and delightful spot, with trees intertwined; it was as if pieces of blue glass had been poured on its soil and the necklace of Sorayya had been hung from its vines."

Bicknell explains "heaven may scatter the necklace of the Pleiades on your poetry" as meaning "may fling as largess to express her delight".

== Critical reception ==
This ode has been admired by numerous scholars and translators. Arberry writes of the last verse: "The 'clasp' theme here used is a very common one, but its present treatment is scarcely surpassed for beauty in the whole Dīvān." Hillmann writes: "A first impression of the 'Turk of Shiraz' is of a texture of hyperbole, paradox, a sense of the ultimate or perfection, eloquence, and seriousness, with familiar images and conceits given new vitality through new combination and given form by means of verse patterning."

Some critics, however, have questioned the coherence or unity of the poem, beginning with William Jones's friend and tutor in Persian, Count Károly Reviczky, who wrote in 1768 "I did not translate the poem into Latin verse, on account of the incoherence of the verses". Jones himself in his version used the phrase "Like orient pearls at random strung". The chief critic in this area is Hillmann, who wrote: "One might conclude that the "Turk of Shiraz" is not a wholly successful poem precisely because it seems lacking in unity, no other aspect or feature of the ghazal having been demonstrated to compensate for this lack".

Defending the poem from such criticism, Arberry finds only two themes in it: "The principal theme is – the fair charmer, beautiful, proud, unapproachable, the human, this-worldly reflection of the immortal loveliness of the Divine spirit. ... The subsidiary theme is – wine (and music) are the sole consolation of the lover, to compensate his sorrow over the incapacity of his love, and the transitory nature of mundane affairs." He scorns the idea that the poem has no unity. Rehder finds that rather than thematic unity, the poem has "an obvious unity of thought and mood".

== Other poems by Hafez ==
There are also articles on the following poems by Hafez on Wikipedia. The number in the edition by Muhammad Qazvini and Qasem Ghani (1941) is given:

- Alā yā ayyoha-s-sāqī – QG 1
- Zolf-'āšofte – QG 26
- Sālhā del – QG 143
- Dūš dīdam ke malā'ek – QG 184
- Naqdhā rā bovad āyā – QG 185
- Goftā borūn šodī – QG 406
- Mazra'-ē sabz-e falak – QG 407
- Sīne mālāmāl – QG 470
