= Alā yā ayyoha-s-sāqī =

14th-century poem by Hafez

Alā yā ayyoha-s-sāqī is a ghazal (love poem) by the 14th-century poet Hafez of Shiraz. It is the opening poem in the collection of Hafez's 530 poems.

In this poem, Hafez calls for wine to soothe his difficulties in love. In a series of varied images he describes his feelings. He is advised to follow the advice of the Elder, and to achieve union with God by letting go of the world.

The poem has generally been considered to have a Sufic intent. The verses alternate between Hafez's expression of his complaints and anxieties, and the reassurance of his spiritual guide. However, Julie Meisami argues that the intention of the poem is not mystical, but literary, and that Hafez by alluding to the love poetry of both Arabic and Persian of the past is laying claim to his position in that tradition.

The first and last line of the poem are both in Arabic. The first Arabic line is said to be a quotation from a poem written by the 7th-century Caliph Yazid I, although some Iranian scholars have disputed this.

This poem has been the subject of numerous commentaries. It was the first Hafez poem to be translated into a European language, when Franciscus Meninski (1623–1698) turned it into Latin prose in 1680. Another Latin translation was made by the English orientalist scholar Thomas Hyde (1636–1703).

== The poem ==
The text given below is that of Muhammad Qazvini and Qasem Ghani (1941). (The text of Parviz Natel-Khanlari (1983) is similar but with verses 3 and 4 reversed.) The transcription shows the modern Iranian pronunciation. ' is a glottal stop, and x is kh (as in Khayyam). The letters غ and ق are both written as q. The underlined syllables are pronounced extra-long, with the value of a long + a short syllable.

For various recitations of the poem, see External links below.

1
الا یا ایها الساقی ادر کأسا و ناولها
که عشق آسان نمود اول ولی افتاد مشکل‌ها

alā yā 'ayyoha-s-sāqī * ader ka'san va nāvelhā
ke 'ešq āsān nemūd avval * valī 'oftād moškelhā

Come, o wine-pourer! Circulate a cup and pass it;
since love seemed easy at first, but soon difficulties occurred.

2
به بوی نافه‌ای کاخر صبا زان طره بگشاید
ز تاب جعد مشکینش چه خون افتاد در دل‌ها

be būy-ē nāfe-ī k-āxer * sabā z-ān torre bogšāyad
ze tāb-ē ja'd-e moškīn-aš * če xūn oftād dar delhā

By the fragrance of the musk-pod which finally the morning breeze will open from that forelock;
because of the twist of its musky ringlet what blood fell in our hearts!

3
مرا در منزل جانان چه امن عیش چون هر دم
جرس فریاد می‌دارد که بربندید محمل‌ها

ma-rā dar manzel-ē jānān * če amn-ē 'eyš, čūn har dam
jaras faryād mīdārad * ke bar-bandīd mahmelhā?

For me, in the halting-place of the beloved, what security of living is there? Since every moment
the bell is calling out "Bind on your camel-litters!"

4
به می سجاده رنگین کن گرت پیر مغان گوید
که سالک بی‌خبر نبود ز راه و رسم منزل‌ها

be mey sajjāde rangīn kon * gar-at pīr-ē moqān gūyad
ke sālek bī-xabar nabvad * ze rāh ō rasm-e manzelhā

Stain the prayer-mat with wine if the Magian Elder tells you,
since the traveller is not uninformed of the road and customs of the halting-places!

5
شب تاریک و بیم موج و گردابی چنین هایل
کجا دانند حال ما سبکباران ساحل‌ها

šab-ē tārīk o bīm-ē mowj * o gerdāb-ī čonīn hāyel
kojā dānand hāl-ē mā * sabokbārān-e sāhelhā?

The dark night and the fear of the waves and so terrifying a whirlpool –
how can the lightly-burdened people of the coasts possibly know our state?

6
همه کارم ز خود کامی به بدنامی کشید آخر
نهان کی ماند آن رازی کز او سازند محفل‌ها

hamē kār-am ze xod-kāmī * be bad-nāmī kašīd āxer
nahān key mānad ān rāz-ī * k-az ū sāzand mahfelhā?

All my work, because of my egotism, has led to a bad reputation!
How can that secret remain hidden which they make public meetings out of?

7
حضوری گر همی‌خواهی از او غایب مشو حافظ
متی ما تلق من تهوی دع الدنیا و اهملها

hozūrī gar hamīxāhī * az ū qāyeb mašow, Hāfez
matā mā talqa man tahvā * da' ed-donyā va 'ahmelhā

If you desire His presence, do not be absent from Him, Hafez.
When you meet the One you desire, abandon the world and let it go!

== Metre ==
The metre is known as hazaj and is the same as that of Shirazi Turk. Each bayt or verse is made of four sections of eight syllables each. In Elwell-Sutton's system, this metre is classified as 2.1.16, and it is used in 25 (4.7%) of Hafez's 530 poems.

| u – – – | u – – – || u – – – | u – – – |

"Overlong" syllables, which take up the place of a long plus a short syllable in the metre, are underlined in the transcription.

== Notes on individual verses ==
=== Verse 1 ===
The poem opens with a line of Arabic, which according to the commentary of the Bosnian-Turkish scholar Ahmed Sudi (d. 1598), is adapted from a quatrain written by the 7th-century Caliph Yazid I. The original quatrain, according to Sudi, was as follows:

انا المسموم ما عندي
بترياق ولا راقي
ادر كاساً وناولها
الا يا ايها الساقي

ʼana-l-masmūmu mā ʿindī
bi-taryāqi wa-lā rāqī
ʼadir kaʼsan wa-nāwilhā
ʼalā yā ʼayyuha-s-sāqī

I am poisoned and I do not have
any remedy or enchanter.
Circulate a cup and pass it;
Ho there, o wine-pourer!

Sudi also quotes from poems of two Persian poets, Kātibī of Nishabur (d. 1434-5) and Ahli Shirazi (d. 1535), in which they express surprise that Hafez had borrowed a line from such a hated figure as Yazid, who was notorious among other things for causing the death of the Prophet's grandson Husayn at the Battle of Karbala in 680. Some Iranians believe that Sudi was mistaken in attributing the quatrain to Yazid; they include Hafez's editor Muhammad Qazvini, who published an article arguing against the attribution. The verse is not included in a volume containing the collected fragments of Yazid's poetry published in 1982; but according to Meisami, even if it is not by Yazid, it is likely that Hafez believed it was and used it deliberately.

The Arabic quatrain is also in the hazaj metre. The Arabic version of this metre allows an occasional short syllable in the fourth position of the line, as in the second line above. There is an internal rhyme in the second line of the above quatrain (taryāqi ... lā rāqī). A similar internal rhyme is used in Hafez's Shirazi Turk ghazal (bedeh sāqī mey-ē baqī...), which uses the same metre.

When Arabic phrases are included in Persian poems, it is usual to pronounce the words with Persian phonology as if they were Persian.

=== Verse 2 ===
According to Sudi, the word būy has both a literal meaning "scent" and a figurative meaning "hope": "in the hope of that musk-pod". Translators interpret the present tense بگشاید bogšāyad "opens" in different ways. Some translate it as present, others as future, others as past.

Musk is a costly perfume derived from the gland (nāfe) of a certain deer. The combination of the morning breeze (sabā) and the scent of musk is common in Persian poetry, and is even found in the famous mu'allaqa of the 6th-century Arabian poet Imru' al-Qais (verse 8):

نَسِيْـمَ الصَّبَـا جَـاءَتْ بِـرَيَّـا القَرَنْـفُـلِ
إِذَا قَامَـتَـا تَـضَـوَّعَ المِـسْـكُ مِنْـهُـمَـا

’iḏā qāmatā taḍawwa‘a l-misku minhumā
nasīma ṣ-ṣabā jā’at bi-rayya l-qaranfulī

Fair were they also, diffusing the odor of musk as they moved,
Like the Saba breeze bringing with it the scent of the clove.

The word تاب tāb has a range of meanings: "heat, burning, radiance, lustre, twist, curl".

The word مشکین moškīn or meškīn can also mean "black". Meisami translates as "musk-black curls".

Dehkhoda's dictionary defines xūn dar del oftādan (literally, "blood falls in the heart") as to become troubled or grieved. According to Avery and Heath-Stubbs, the idea of this verse is that such beauty makes the hearts of lovers bleed. Meisami, however, translates as "what blood rushed into (lovers') hearts?" According to an image commonly found in Persian and Arabic poetry, the heat (tāb) of the beloved's curls causes the lover's blood to heat up and emerge in the form of sighs. She points out the repeated "ā" sounds in this verse, which may represent sighing.

=== Verse 3 ===
Some translators interpret the phrase manzel-ē jānān as referring to "this world" (Clarke), "life's caravanserai" (Arberry). Many translate jānān (literally "souls") as "the Beloved" (Clarke, Salami, Seif). However, Seif disagrees that Hafez is referring to the world. He interprets: "In this couplet of our ghazal, the speaker is complaining of the temporariness of his visit with the Beloved." He adds: "In Sufism, there are seven "Manzels," "stages," on the way to the Beloved, of which the last one is "tajarrod" that means "oneness"."

The following well-known verse by Rumi expresses a similar idea in which the mystical journey towards union with God is compared to setting off from a caravanserai:

ای عاشقان ای عاشقان * هنگام کوچ است از جهان
در گوش جانم می رسد * طبل رحیل از آسمان

'ey 'āšeqān 'ey 'āšeqān, * hengām-e kūč ast az jahān
dar gūš-e jān-am mīrasad * tabl-ē rahīl az 'āsmān

"O lovers, o lovers, it is time for setting off from the world;
into the ear of my soul there comes from heaven the drum of departure."

Meisami, however, sees Hafez here not so much referring to "this world" as making a literary allusion to the image commonly found in Arabic poetry of the departing tribe abandoning their halting-place and taking the women with them, carried in litters on the camels' backs. She suggests that the word rasm, usually translated as "customs", might in this context have the same meaning it has in Imru' al-Qais's mu'allaqa (verses 2 and 6), namely "traces" of the encampment.

=== Verse 4 ===
The Magian Elder (or Zoroastrian wine-seller) is frequently mentioned in Hafez's poetry, and is often used symbolically for the spiritual adviser or Pir, "dispensing wine and true wisdom". An initiate who wished to be guided in the spiritual path was known as a murīd "disciple" or sālik "traveller". Annemarie Schimmel writes: "The mystical path has sometimes been described as a ladder, a staircase that leads to heaven, on which the salik slowly and patiently climbs toward higher levels of experience."

This mystical interpretation of the verse is followed by Arberry: the wine-seller "knows by experience that reason is powerless to solve the ultimate riddle of the universe ... and that it is only the wine of unreason that makes life in this world a tolerable burden." Meisami does not see this verse as primarily mystical, but believes that Hafez "is retracing a life of ... poetry, – his own poetry, and that of the tradition that informs it." ... "Hafiz appropriates both the Persian and the earlier Arabic traditions of love poetry."

=== Verse 5 ===
Some translators follow a different order of verses: Clarke and Bell put verse 4 after verse 2, Arberry places it after verse 5, while Seif (without manuscript authority) puts it after verse 6. Others (e.g. Salami, Avery & Heath-Stubbs), following the order of the text above, connect verse 5 in sense to verse 4. The idea is that only the seasoned traveller knows the difficulties of the spiritual journey, which are compared to storms.

Arberry compares this verse with ghazal 143 (Sālhā del) verse 2, where those who have never experienced the torments of divine love are referred to as gom-šodegān-ē lab-e daryā "those lost on the edge of the sea". The "sea" is used in mystic poetry as a metaphor for divine love. The early 12th-century mystic poet Sana'i wrote:

عشق دریای محیط و آب دریا آتشست
موجها آید که گویی کوههای ظلمتست

'ešq daryā-yē mohīt ō āb-e daryā ātaš ast
mowjhā āyad ke gū'ī kūhhā-yē zolmat ast

Love is a sea which encircles the world and the water of the sea is fire;
waves come which are like the mountains of the place of darkness.

=== Verse 6 ===
Seif explains: "Here Hafez is referring to his libertine way of life. As an unconventional man, he had no regard for name, whether good or bad. ... For him, if ascetics and bigots should enjoy good names, he would rather be infamous."

=== Verse 7 ===
According to Clarke, the -ī on the word hozūrī "presence" is a redundant suffix found also in other abstract nouns such as salāmatī "safety" and ziyādatī "abundance".

The gender of the beloved is ambiguous in Persian. It could be a woman, as in the Arabic poetry which Hafez is apparently imitating, or a boy or young man, as often in Persian love poetry; or it could refer to God, if the poem is given a Sufic interpretation.

The final half-verse, like the first, is in Arabic. Sudi gives no source for this, so it is presumably Hafez's own composition. Avery and Heath-Stubbs comment: "By continued perseverance, that may be obtained for which the world is well lost."

== Other poems by Hafez ==
There are also articles on the following poems by Hafez on Wikipedia. The number in the edition by Muhammad Qazvini and Qasem Ghani (1941) is given:

- Shirazi Turk – QG 3
- Zolf-'āšofte – QG 26
- Dūš dīdam ke malā'ek – QG 184
- Naqdhā rā bovad āyā – QG 185
- Goftā borūn šodī – QG 406
- Mazra'-ē sabz-e falak – QG 407
- Sīne mālāmāl – QG 470
