= Naqdhā rā bovad āyā =

14th-century poem by Hafez

Naqdhā rā bovad āyā is a short ghazal (love poem) by the 14th-century Persian poet Hafez of Shiraz. It is no. 185 in the Qazvini-Ghani edition of Hafez's poems (1941). The poem is famous for a fine Persian miniature painting of 1585 illustrating the scene.

In this poem Hafez advises hermits and ascetics to abandon their way of life and take up love. He describes the delights of making love to the sound of music, and tells how powerless they will be when overcome by the beauty of a beloved. In the last verse he advises poor people to avoid the society of the rich, who have no sympathy for them.

The poem is written in such a way that it is difficult to tell whether Hafez is describing a real scene of love-making or using symbolic language to illustrate the mystic ecstasy of a Sufi on the path to union with God.

== The poem ==
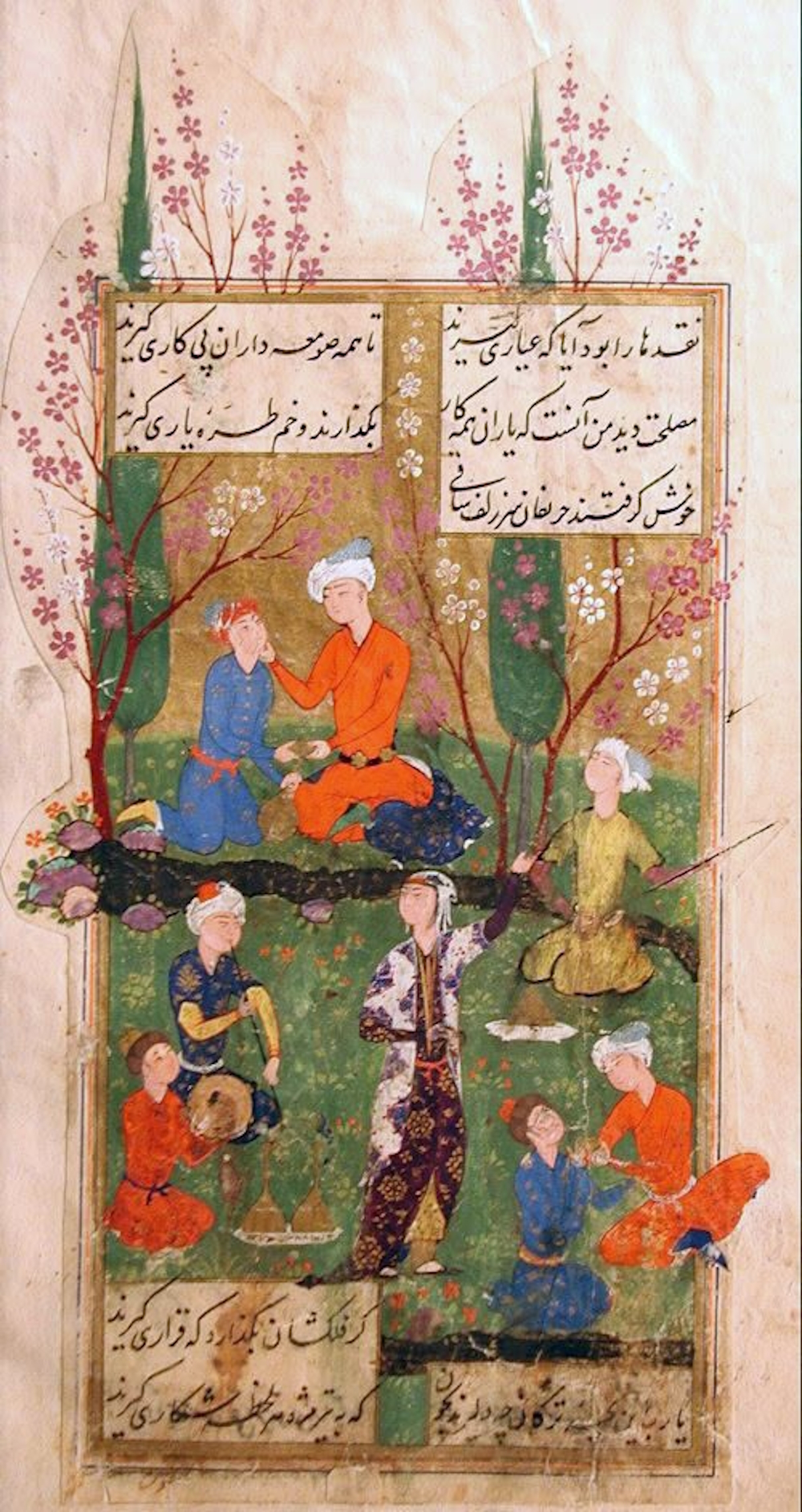
Divan of Hafez, Persian miniature, 1585.

In the transcription, "x" represents the sound kh (خ) as in Khayyam, the letters gheyn (غ) and qāf (ق) are both written as "q ", and the sign " ' " represents a glottal stop. "Overlong" syllables, that is, syllables which can take the place of a long plus a short syllable in the metre, are underlined.

1
نقدها را بُوَد آیا که عیاری گیرند
تا همه صومعه‌داران پیِ کاری گیرند

naqdhā rā bovad āyā ke 'ayār-ī gīrand
tā hamē sowme'e-dārān pey-e kār-ī gīrand?

Is it possible that they might make an assay of coins
so that all the cloister-dwellers will go and look for some work?

2
مصلحت‌دید من آن است که یاران همه کار
بگذارند و خَم طرۀ یاری گیرند

maslahat-dīd-e man ān ast ke yārān hame kār
begozārand o xam-ē torre-ye yār-ī gīrand

The best course in my opinion is for friends to abandon
all work and take hold of the curl of the forelock of a beloved!

3
خوش گرفتند حریفان سرِ زلفِ ساقی
گر فلکشان بگذارد که قراری گیرند

xoš gereftand harīfān sar-e zolf-ē sāqī
gar falak-šān begozārad ke qarār-ī gīrand

Our companions would do well to take hold of the tip of the wine-pourer's curly hair,
if heaven permits them to find an undisturbed place.

4
قوّت بازوی پرهیز به خوبان مفروش
که در این خیل حصاری به سواری گیرند

qovvat-ē bāzu-ye parhīz be xūbān maforūš
ke dar īn xeyl hesār-ī be savār-ī gīrand

Do not boast to handsome ones of the strength of your resolve;
since in this troop, they take a fortress with a single horseman!

5
یا رب این بچّۀ ترکان چه دلیرند به خون
که به تیرِ مژه هر لحظه شکاری گیرند

yā Rab, īn bačče-ye Torkān če delīr-and be xūn
ke be tīr-ē može har lahze šekār-ī gīrand

O Lord, how fearless these young Turks are for blood,
since they capture a prisoner every moment with the arrow of an eyelash!

6
رقص بر شعرِ تر و نالۀ نی خوش باشد
خاصه رقصی که در آن دستِ نگاری گیرند

raqs bar še'r-e tar ō nāle-ye ney xoš bāšad
xāse raqs-ī ke dar ān dast-e negār-ī gīrand

Dancing to the poetry of the tar and the plaintive note of the flute is delightful,
especially a dance in which they take hold of the hand of a beauty.

7
حافظ ابنای زمان را غم مسکینان نیست
زین میان گر بتوان به که کناری گیرند

Hāfez, abnā-ye zamān rā qam-e meskīnān nīst
z-īn miyān gar betavān beh ke kenār-ī gīrand

Hafez, the sons of the age have no sympathy for the poor;
it is better if possible that the poor should avoid going amongst them.

== The miniature painting ==
The miniature painting illustrated above dates to 1585, some 200 years after Hafez. It illustrates four verses of ghazal 185 (the 1st, 2nd, 3rd and 5th). However, verse 6, which describes the musicians themselves, is not included.

In the pictures a gentleman in a red gown, illustrated twice, is making advances to a young male wine-pourer (sāqī). Three musicians, playing a drum (tabl), flute (ney) and a stringed instrument (tar) are accompanying a person, apparently a woman, who is dancing. In front of the musicians are dishes on which wine bottles are placed.

The musicians are seated in a meadow beside a small stream. In the background are two tall fastigiate Persian cypress trees. The flowers in the meadow and the blossoms on the leafless trees near the stream indicate that it is spring time.

== The metre ==
The metre is called ramal-e maxbūn ("hemmed ramal"), since in contrast to the usual ramal with its feet of – u – –, all the feet except the first are "hemmed", that is, shortened, to u u – –. It is a catalectic metre since the last foot fa'ilātun lacks the final syllable and becomes fa'ilun.

In the scheme below, x = anceps (i.e. long or short syllable), u = a short syllable, and – = a long syllable:

| x u – – | u u – – | u u – – | u u – |

In Elwell-Sutton's system of Persian metres this metre is classified as 3.1.15. The final pair of short syllables is biceps, that is, the two short syllables may be replaced by a single long syllable; this occurs in about 35% of lines. The first syllable in this metre is long in about 80% of lines.

This metre is fairly common in classical Persian lyric poetry, and is used in 143 (27%) of the 530 poems of Hafez.

== Interpretation ==
=== Verse 1 ===
The phrase naqd rā 'ayyār-ī gīrand "make an assay of coins" is presumably used metaphorically here. Clarke (1891) interprets it as meaning "make an assay of hearts". The Persian is ambiguous between "may make" and "are making".

The word sowme'e (sawme'a) was a cloister or place of retreat for Sufis or ascetics. Lewis writes: "The Sufis of the cloister (ṣawmeʿa) with their ceremonious attire proclaiming a sham spirituality (jāma-ye sālus, ḵerqa-ye sālus) are just as guilty of hypocrisy (riā) as the preachers."

=== Verse 2 ===
In Hafez's poems a frequent theme is that the way to heaven is best found through Love rather than through reason ('aql), wisdom (hekmat) or religion (dīn). In Shirazi Turk he advises: "Tell a tale of musician and wine, and seek the secret of time less; since no one has solved or will ever solve this mystery by wisdom".

=== Verse 5 ===
Torkān "Turks", in the language of Persian love poetry, is a metaphor frequently used for the beautiful youths who ravage the hearts of their lovers. (See Shirazi Turk.) Arberry quotes a verse of Saadi: "You carry off the heart of a city with a coquettish glance in just the same way as the slaves of the Banu Sa'd carried off the 'banquet of plunder'."

=== Verse 7 ===
Clarke explains "sons of the age" (or "sons of the time") as the amirs (rulers). But Amid's Dictionary explains it as "people of this age". Dehkhoda's Dictionary agrees and quotes a verse of Saadi:

این گرسِنه گرگِ بی‌ترحم
خود سیر نمی‌شود ز مردم
ابنای زمان مثالِ گندم
وین دورِ فلک چو آسیاب است

īn gorsne-ye gorg-e bī-tarahhom
xod sīr nemīšavad ze mardom
abnā-ye zamān mesāl-e gandom
v-īn dowr-e falak čo āsiyāb ast

These ravenous merciless wolves
never tire of eating humans;
the sons of the age are like wheat,
and this turning heaven is like a mill.

== Other Hafez poems ==
There are articles on the following poems by Hafez on Wikipedia. The number in the edition by Muhammad Qazvini and Qasem Ghani (1941) is given:

- Alā yā ayyoha-s-sāqī – QG 1
- Shirazi Turk – QG 3
- Zolf-'āšofte – QG 26
- Sālhā del – QG 143
- Dūš dīdam ke malā'ek – QG 184
- Goftā borūn šodī – QG 406
- Mazra'-ē sabz-e falak – QG 407
- Sīne mālāmāl – QG 470
