= Roknabad, Shiraz =

District on the north-east side of Shiraz, Iran

Roknābād or Ruknābād (Persian: رکن‌آباد) is the name of a district on the north-east side of Shiraz, Iran, watered by a man-made stream of the same name. It was made famous in English literature in the translations of the 14th-century Persian poet Hafez made among others by Gertrude Bell, who wrote (1897):

In the Garden of Paradise vainly thou'lt seek
The lip of the fountain of Ruknabad,
And the bowers of Mosalla where roses twine.

Earlier, in the very first version of a Persian poem to be translated into English, the orientalist William Jones had translated the same verse as follows (1771):

Tell them, their Eden cannot show
A stream so clear as Rocnabad,
A bower so sweet as Mosellay.

The beauty of the stream was celebrated not only by Hafez, but also by the poet Saadi (13th century), and by the traveller Ibn Battuta (14th century). The tombs of both Hafez and Saadi are both situated near branches of the stream: the tomb of Hafez near the road halfway between the Qur'an Gate and the bazaar, and the tomb of Saadi just over a mile to the east of Hafez's tomb.

Travellers such as Ármin Vámbéry and Edward Granville Browne were surprised to find that the Roknabad stream, despite its fame in Persian poetry, was quite small; according to Wilberforce Clarke, only 4 foot wide. The stream is fed by a man-made underground channel (qanāt) bringing irrigation water from a mountain about 6 miles from Shiraz on the north side of the city. The district itself was named after a 10th-century ruler Rukn al-Dawla.

== Saadi and Hafez ==
The 14th century poet of Shiraz, Hafez, mentions Roknabad several times, but the most famous reference is the verse translated by Jones, Bell, and others taken from his Shirazi Turk poem:

بده ساقی می باقی که در جنت نخواهی یافت
کنار آب رکن‌آباد و گلگشت مصلا را

bedeh, sāqī, mey-ē bāqī ke dar jannat naxāhī yāft
kenār-ē āb-e Roknābād o golgašt-ē Mosallā-rā

"Give, wine-pourer, the rest of the wine, since in Paradise you will not find
the banks of the water of Roknabad and the flower-walk of Mosalla."

In the 13th century, the poet Saadi also wrote about the stream, and how he was continually drawn back to Shiraz by its beauty:

روی گفتم که در جهان بنهم
گردم از قید بندگی آزاد
که نه بیرون پارس منزل هست
شام و رومست و بصره و بغداد
دست از دامنم نمی‌دارد
خاک شیراز و آب رکن‌آباد

rūy goftam ke dar jahān benham
kardam az qeyd-e bandegī āzād
ke na bīrūn-e Pārs manzel hast
Šām o Rūm-ast o Basre vō Baqdād
dast 'az dāman-am nemīdārad
xāk-e Šīrāz o āb-e Roknābād

"I decided to show my face in the world
and freed myself from the bondage of slavery,
saying, is there no dwelling outside of Pars,
in Syria, Turkey, Basra or Baghdad?
But they never leave go of my skirt –
the soil of Shiraz and the water of Roknabad."

Another name which Hafez gives to the stream is āb-e Roknī "the water of Rokn". In the following lines he refers to the fact that the stream has its source in the Allahu Akbar pass to the north of Shiraz:

شیراز و آب رکنی و این باد خوش‌نسیم
عیبش مکن که خال رخ هفت کشور است
فرق است از آب خضر که ظلْمات جای او است
تا آب ما که منبعش الله اکبر است

Šīrāz o āb-e Rokni o īn bād-e xoš nasīm
'eyb-aš makon ke xāl-e rox-ē haft kešvar ast
farq ast az āb-e Xezr ke Zolmāt jā-ye ū-st
tā āb-e mā ke mamba'-aš Allāhu Akbar ast

"Shiraz and the Rokni Water and this delightful breeze –
do not fault them since it is the beauty spot on the cheek of the Seven Climes.
There is a difference between the water of Khidr, whose place is the Land of Darkness,
and our water, whose source is "God is Great"!"

== Ibn Battuta ==
The traveller Ibn Battuta, who visited Shiraz in 1327, wrote in the account of his travels completed in 1355:

"Shiraz lies in a plain; gardens surround it on every side; and five rivers flow through it, amongst them one called Ruknabad, a stream of which the water is excellent to drink, very cold in summer and warm in winter. ... One of the mausoleums outside the town contains the tomb of Sheikh Sa'di, the first poet of his time. Close at hand is a hermitage built by Sa'di himself, surrounded by a charming garden. It is situated near the source of the Ruknabad. In the garden Sheikh Sa'di constructed a number of basins for the washing of clothes. The citizens of Shiraz make parties of pleasure to this mausoleum; they eat food prepared in the hermitage, wash their garments in the river, and at sunset return to the town. So did I also. May God have mercy on Shiraz!"

== Edward Granville Browne ==
Edward Granville Browne, later to become author of the well-known A Literary History of Persia, visited Shiraz as a young man in March 1888, and recorded his impressions of the Roknabad stream as he approached the city from the north as follows:

"Beyond this there was little to attract my interest till, about 1.30, on surmounting another pass, Ḥájí Ṣafar cried out "Ruknábád! Ruknábád!" and, with a thrill of pleasure, I found myself at the source of that stream, so dear to every Shírází, of which Ḥáfiẓ declared, in perhaps the best known of his poems, that Paradise itself could not boast the like.

"But for the rich associations which the sight of it evoked in my mind, I might perhaps have experienced that sense of disappointment with which Vámbéry declares he was affected by the first view of this classic stream. As it was, I saw nothing but the limpid water rushing from its rocky source; heard nothing but its melodious ripple; thought nothing but those thoughts which rise in the mind of one who first stands in the favourite haunt of an immortal bard who immortalises all that he touches."

== Herman Bicknell ==
The linguist and traveller Herman Bicknell, who spent several months in Shiraz in 1868, writes:

"The ruined mosque of Musallá, and the brook of Ruknábád about four feet wide, are a mile to the North of Shíráz. The water of this streamlet, derived from a spring in the pass of Allâhu Akbar, has been made to branch into two principal channels, one South-eastward, the other South-westward, to irrigate various sown fields and gardens, among the latter the Háfizíah, part of which is a cemetery, and contains the poet's tomb. By the "bloomy ways of Mosallá," Háfiz means the corn-fields, bright in spring with corn-flowers, poppies, and the grape-hyacinth; perhaps also the alleys in the neighbouring gardens."

An illustration in Bicknell's translation shows the position of the two streams in relation to the Isfahan road.
