= Zolf-'āšofte =

14th-century poem by Hafez

Zolf-'āšofte is a ghazal (love-song) by the 14th-century Persian poet Hafez of Shiraz. In this poem, Hafez is visited in the night by a former beloved, and it becomes clear through metaphorical language that the encounter is successful. There is no hint of any Sufic or esoteric connection in this poem. The poem is no. 26 in the edition of Muhammad Qazvini and Qasem Ghani (1941) and no. 22 in the edition of Parviz Natel-Khanlari (2nd ed. 1983).

== The poem ==
In the transcription below, "x" = kh as in Khayyam, ' is a glottal stop. Overlong syllables, which take up the time of a long plus a short syllable in the metre, are underlined.

1
زلف‌آشفته و خوی‌کرده و خندان‌لب و مست
پیرهن‌چاک و غزل‌خوان و صراحی در دست

zolf-'āšofte vo xoy/xey-karde vo xandān-lab o mast
pīrahan-čāk o qazal-xān o sorāhī dar dast

Tousled-hair and sweating and smiling-lipped and drunk,
shirt-torn and singing songs and wine-flask in hand,

2
نرگسش عربده‌جوی و لبش افسوس‌کنان
نیم‌شب دوش به بالین من آمد بنشست

narges-aš 'arbade-jūy ō lab-aš afsūs-konān
nīm-šab dūš be bālīn-e man āmad benešast

Her/His eye looking for a quarrel and her/his lip mocking,
at midnight last night s/he came to my pillow and sat down.

3
سر فرا گوش من آورد، به آواز حزین
گفت: ای عاشق دیرینه من خوابت هست؟

sar farā gūš-e man āvard be 'āvāz-e hazīn
goft, 'ey 'āšeq-e dīrīne-ye man, xāb-at hast?

S/He brought his/her head close to my ear and in a plaintive voice
said "Hey, old-time lover of mine, are you asleep?"

4
عاشقی را که چنین باده شبگیر دهند
کافر عشق بُوَد گر نشود باده‌پرست

'āšeq-ī rā ke čonīn bāde-ye šab-gīr dehand
kāfer-ē 'ešq bovad gar našavad bāde-parast!

A lover to whom they give such nocturnal wine
is an infidel of Love if he doesn't become a worshipper of wine!

5
برو ای زاهد و بر دُردکشان خرده مگیر
که ندادند جز این تحفه به ما روز الست

borow ey zāhed o bar dord-kešān xorde magīr
ke nadādand joz īn tohfe be mā rūz-e 'alast

Go, ascetic, and do not criticise those who drink the dregs!
Since they didn't give anything but this gift to us on the day of the Covenant.

6
آن‌چه او ریخت به پیمانه ما نوشیدیم
اگر از خمر بهشت است وگر باده مست

ān če 'ū rīxt be peymāne-ye mā nūšīdīm
agar az xamr-e behešt ast v-agar bāde-ye mast

Whatever He poured into our cup, we drank,
whether it is of the wine of paradise or the drunkard's brew.

7
خنده جام می و زلف گره‌گیر نگار
ای بسا توبه که چون توبه حافظ بشکست

xande-yē jām-e mey ō zolf-e gereh-gīr-e negār
ey basā towbe ke čūn towbe-ye Hāfez bešekast!

The smile of a cup of wine and the curly hair of a beauty –
how many repentances have they broken like the repentance of Hafez!

== The metre ==
The metre is called ramal-e maxbūn ("hemmed ramal"), since in contrast to the usual ramal with its feet of – u – –, all the feet except the first are "hemmed", that is, shortened, to u u – –. It is a catalectic metre since the last foot fa'ilātun lacks the final syllable and becomes fa'ilun.

In the scheme below, x = anceps (i.e. long or short syllable), u = a short syllable, and – = a long syllable:

| x u – – | u u – – | u u – – | u u – |

In Elwell-Sutton's system of Persian metres this metre is classified as 3.1.15. The final pair of short syllables is biceps, that is, the two short syllables may be replaced by a single long syllable; this occurs in about 35% of lines. The first syllable in this metre is long in about 80% of lines.

This metre is fairly common in classical Persian lyric poetry, and is used in 143 (27%) of the 530 poems of Hafez.

== Notes on individual verses ==
=== Verse 1 ===
The gender of the person described is not made clear in the Persian; it could be a man or a woman, and is possibly left deliberately ambiguous by Hafez. However, in view of the long tradition of homoerotic Persian love poetry in the centuries before Hafez, it is most likely that the person is male. "Many of the unusual attributes of the 'beloved' can be understood by recalling that in the classical lyric poetry the image of the poet's sweetheart refers more often than not to a male figure, normally a youth".

Verses 1, 2 and 7 have echoes of the opening verses of a well-known poem of the 13th-century mystic poet Iraqi which begins:

از پرده برون آمد ساقی قدحی در دست
هم پردهٔ ما بدرید، هم توبهٔ ما بشکست
بنمود رخ زیبا، گشتیم همه شیدا
چون هیچ نماند از ما آمد بر ما بنشست

az parde borūn āmad * sāqī qadah-ī dar dast
ham parde-ye mā bedrīd * ham towbe-ye mā beškast
benmūd rox-ē zībā * gaštīm hamē šeydā
čūn hīč namānd az mā * āmad bar-e mā benšast

"From behind the curtain came out the wine-pourer, a cup in hand;
He both tore our curtain, and broke our resolution.
He showed his beautiful face, we all became insane;
When nothing remained of us, he came and sat down beside us."

The same Iraqi poem opening is imitated in Hafez's ghazal 27.

As Edward Granville Browne translates it, Iraqi's poem contains Sufic imagery, but most commentators do not see this ghazal of Hafez as having a Sufic interpretation.

=== Verse 2 ===
نرگس narges is literally a narcissus-flower, but here refers to the eye.

افسوس کنان afsūs-konān suggests banter, mockery, teasing, jesting.

=== Verse 5 ===
The phrase rūz-e alast "the day of 'Am I not?' " refers to the occasion, early in the history of creation, when, according to Qur'ān 7.172, God removed Adam's as-yet-unborn descendants from the loins of Adam's children and asked them "Am I not your Lord?" (alastu bi-rabbikum?), and they replied "Yes! We have borne witness" (balā! šahidnā). It is also known as the day of the Primordial Covenant. See further: Covenant (religion)#Islam.

=== Verse 7 ===
The word توبه towbe means "vowing to sin no more; repenting; repentance, penitence; conversion; abjuring; renouncing; recantation". With this word Hafez indicates that he knew that what he did was a sin, but nonetheless he did it.

== Other Hafez poems ==
There are articles on the following poems by Hafez on Wikipedia. The number in the edition by Muhammad Qazvini and Qasem Ghani (1941) is given:

- Alā yā ayyoha-s-sāqī – QG 1
- Shirazi Turk – QG 3
- Dūš dīdam ke malā'ek – QG 184
- Naqdhā rā bovad āyā – QG 185
- Goftā borūn šodī – QG 406
- Mazra'-ē sabz-e falak – QG 407
- Sīne mālāmāl – QG 470
