= Károly Reviczky =

Hungarian nobleman, bibliophile, and orientalist

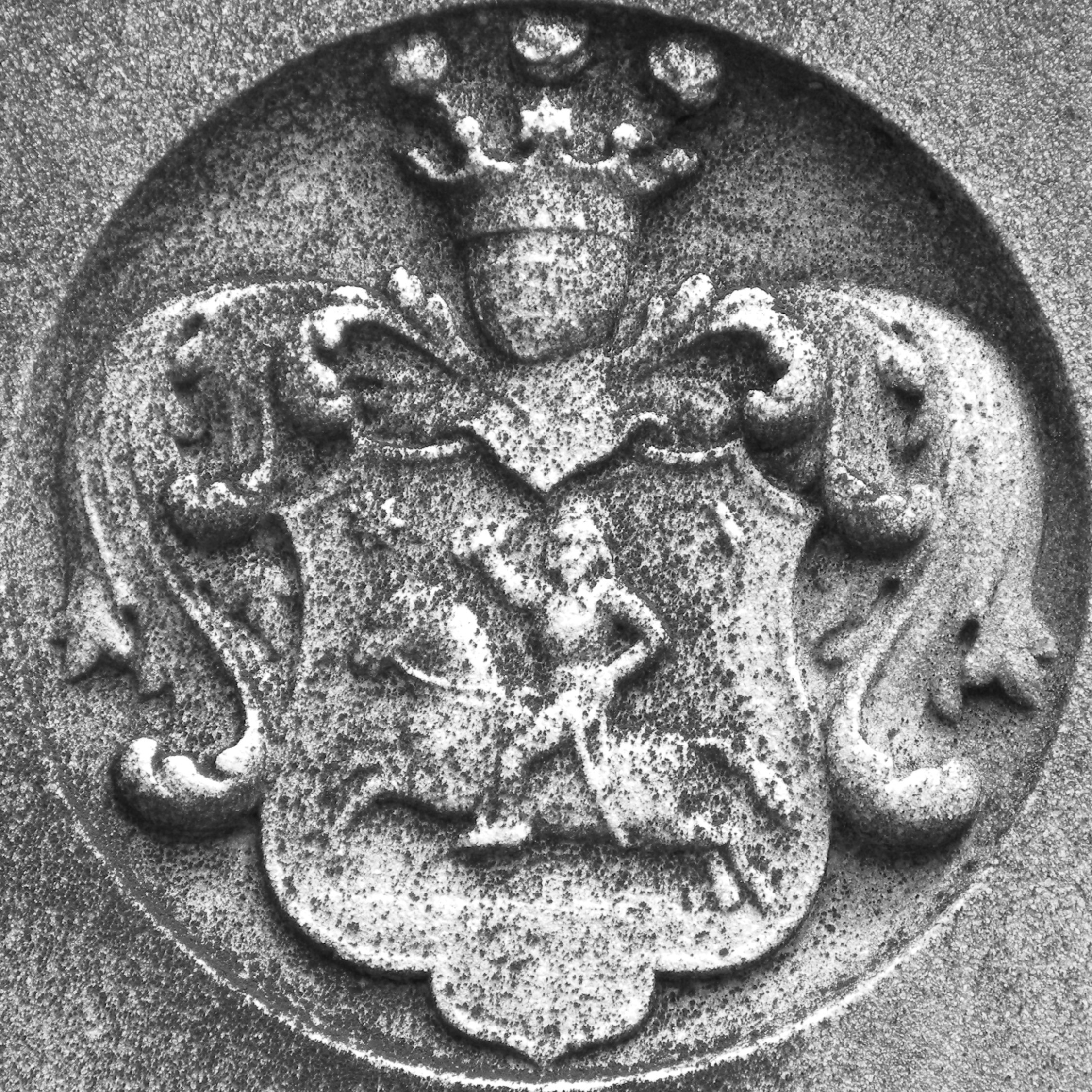
Coat of arms of Count Károly Reviczky

Count Károly Reviczky (Hungarian pronunciation: [ˈrɛvit͡ski]) de Revisnye (Hungarian: revisnyei gróf Reviczky Károly; 4 November 1737 – 10 August 1793), also known as Charles de Reviczky, was a Hungarian nobleman, bibliophile and orientalist. He was eminent for his classical taste and erudition.

== Biography ==
Reviczky was born in Revišné in 1737, present day Slovakia. He served as Envoy Extraordinary from the emperor of Hungary to the King of Great Britain, and as Austrian Minister at Florence.

With great judgment and at a considerable expense, he collected a classical library, which he sold during his residence in London to George Spencer, 2nd Earl Spencer of Althorp. The purchase included an annuity for Reviczky's life, and it formed the basis of Spencer's collection. Of this collection the Count printed and distributed a descriptive catalogue under the title of Bibliotheca Graca et Latina, complectens auctores fere, omnes Grscite et Latii veteris, quorum opera, vel fragmenta xtatem tulerunt, exceptia tantum asceticis et theologicis Patrum nuncupatorum scriptis; cum delectu editionum tam primariarum, principum, et rarissimarura, quam etiam optimarum, splendidissimarum, atque nitidissimtrum, quas usui meo paravi, Periergus Deltophilus, Berolini (1784, 8 volumes). It has likewise the following French title, Catalogue de mes Livres. Premiere Partie, contenant les auteurs Classiques Grecs et Latins, avec des remarques tires de different ouvrages bibliographiques, souvent cclaircise, quelquefois redressees. Prefixed to the work (which consists of about 300 pages) is a letter of ten pages, in French, addressed to M. L'A. D**** (M. l'Abbé Denina). Besides this work, Reviczky published an essay in French on Turkish Tactics (Vienna, 8 volumes), and Specimen Poeseds Persicne, s. Muhammedis Schemseddini, notioris agnomine Haphyzi, Ghazeke sive oda sexdccim ex initio Diwani depromtae; nunc primum Latinitate donats, cum mctaphrasi ligata et soluta, paraphrasi item et notis, (Vienna, 1771, 8 volumes).

Reviczky was made a Commander of the Order of St. Stephen. He died at Vienna in August 1793.
