= Siamak =

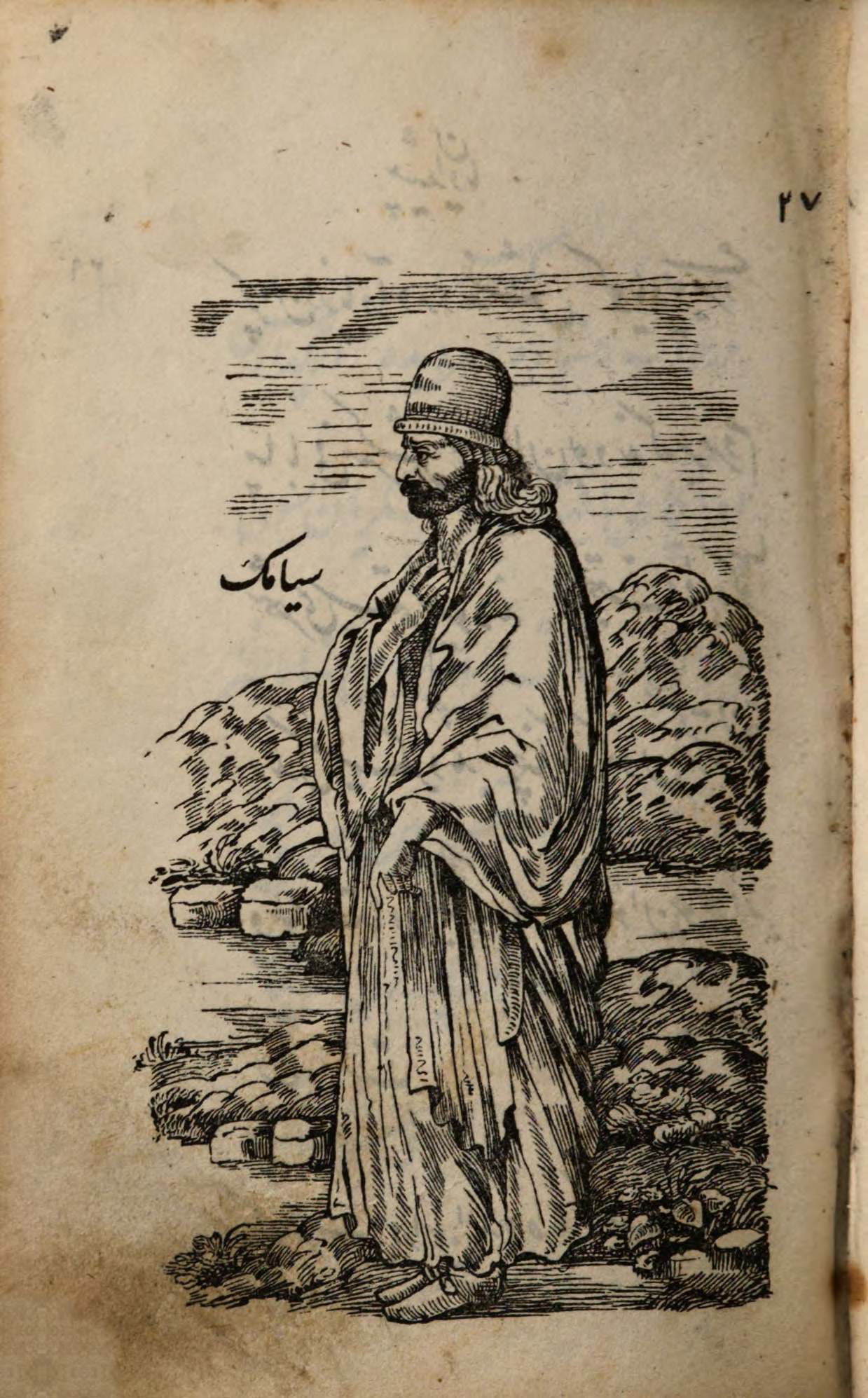
- Illustration of Siamak by Jalal al-Din Mirza

Siamak (Persian: سیامک [sɪjɑˈmæk], sometimes transliterated as Siyamak or Siamac) is a character in Shahnameh, the national epic of Greater Iran.

Ferdowsi's great epic poem begins with the story of Keyumars, the first king to arise among humans, who at that time lived in mountain caves and wore the skins of leopards. God (Hormazd) granted him the supernatural radiance called farr reserved for kings. His son was Siāmak and was beloved by all, except the destructive spirit Ahriman, who raised an army under the command of his own demonic son. When the divine figure Sorush warned Keyumars, Siāmak led an army of his own. Siāmak accepted a challenge to single combat and died at the hands of the demon.

Keyumars mourned for a year, and then Sorush advised him to fight Ahriman once more. Siāmak's son Hushang led the army that defeated Ahriman's son, whom he bound and beheaded.

Keyumars died after a thirty-year reign, leaving his throne to Hushang.

== Etymology and meaning ==
In terms of etymology, it has been suggested that the word is a compound of siāh (Persian: سیاه, meaning 'black') + moo (Persian: مو, meaning 'hair') + -ak (suffix of endearment in Persian), hence giving the overall meaning of "beloved black-haired boy" or simply "possessor of black hair". Other meanings have been also suggested; among others: "bringer of joy" and "great emperor".
