= Cup of Jamshid =

Grail of divination in Persian mythology

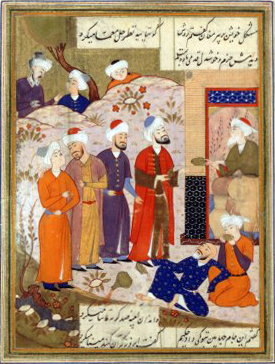
Hafez looking at the Cup of Jamshid, Bibliothèque nationale de France, Turkish manuscript of 1477, author unknown, from Shiraz, Iran.

The Cup of Jamshid (Persian: جام جم, jām-e Jam) is a cup of divination, which in Persian mythology was long possessed by the rulers of ancient Greater Iran. Its name is associated with Jamshid (Jam in short), a mythological figure of Greater Iranian culture and tradition. The cup has also been called Jam-e Jahan nama, Jam-e Jahan Ara, Jam-e Giti nama, and Jam-e Kei-khosrow. The latter refers to Kaei Husravah in the Avesta, and Sushrava in the Vedas.

The cup has been the subject of many Persian poems and stories. Many authors ascribed the success of the Persian Empire to the possession of this artifact. It appears extensively in Persian literature.

The cup ("Jām") was said to be filled with an elixir of immortality and was used in scrying. As mentioned by Ali-Akbar Dehkhoda, it was believed that all seven heavens of the universe could be observed by looking into it (از هفت فلک در او مشاهده و معاینه کردی). It was believed to have been discovered in Persepolis in ancient times. The whole world was said to be reflected in it, and divinations within the cup were said to reveal deep truths. Sometimes, especially in popular depictions such as The Heroic Legend of Arslan, the cup has been visualized as a crystal ball. Helen Zimmern's English translation of the Shahnameh uses the term "crystal globe".

The seven-ringed Cup of Jamshid is spoken of in the classic poem Rubaiyat by Omar Khayyam, the 11th century Persian poet and polymath. See the 5th verse in the 5th translation by Edward Fitzgerald:

Iram indeed is gone with all its Rose, And Jamshyd's Sev'n-ring'd Cup where no one knows; But still the Vine her ancient Ruby yields, And still a Garden by the Water blows.

It also finds mention in the Sawāneḥ, authored by Persian Sufi mystic Ahmad Ghazali:

As long as the world-displaying goblet is in my hand, the wheel of heaven on high lowers itself before me / As long as the Kaʿba of non-being is the qebla of my being, the most sober man in the world is intoxicated by me.

In 20th century literature, the cup was mentioned in by the poet, philosopher, and one of the founder fathers of Pakistan, Allama Muhammad Iqbal in his poem Tasvīr-i Dard "The Portrait of Anguish":

Urdu (romanized): "Agar Dekha Bhi Uss Ne Sare Aalam Ko To Kya Dekha? Nazar Ayi Na Kuch Apni Haqiqat Jaam Se Jam Ko". English(translated): Even if he viewed the whole world, what did he see? Jam could not see his own reality in the wine cup.

== See also ==
- Cornucopia (mythical vessels with magical powers)
- Chalice of Doña Urraca
- Drinking horn
- Holy Chalice
- Holy Grail
- Mythological objects (list)
- Nanteos Cup
- Relic
- Sampo
