= Herman Bicknell =

British linguist (1830–1875)

- Born: 2 April 1830; Surrey, London
- Died: 14 March 1875 (aged 44); London

Academic work
- School or tradition: Various, College of Surgeons
- Main interests: Botany and Astronomy
- Notable works: Translation of Háfiz

Herman Bicknell (2 April 1830 – 14 March 1875) was an FRAS, British surgeon, orientalist, and linguist, son of Elhanan Bicknell.

== Early life ==
He was born on 2 April 1830, in Surrey, and received his education in a variety of locations to include Paris, Hanover, University College, and St. Bartholomew's Hospital. His grandfather, William Bicknell, followed such Christian reformers as John Wesley and Elhanan Winchester, after whom his father was named. His father was a committed Unitarian and a major donor to the British and Foreign Unitarian Association.

After taking his degree at the College of Surgeons in 1854, and passing the military medical examination, he joined the army at Hong Kong in 1855 as assistant surgeon, whence he was transferred, in 1856, to Mianmír, Lahore. Whilst serving four years in India, throughout the period of the great mutiny, he assiduously studied oriental dialects, at intervals exploring portions of Java, Thibet, and the Himalayas.

== Discharge and travels ==
On returning to England, by the Indus and Palestine, he was soon placed on the staff at Aldershot, but speedily resigned his commission, that he might devote himself entirely to travel and languages. From this period he undertook many journeys of various duration and difficulty, extending from the Arctic regions to the Andes of Ecuador, and from America to the far East, more especially with the object of improving himself in ethnology, botany, and general science.

== Primary translations ==
In 1862 he started from London in the assumed character of an English Muslim gentleman, and, devoid of European contact, proceeded to Cairo, where he lived for a considerable period in the native quarter of the city. By this time so intimately acquainted had he become with the habits and manners of Islám, that in the spring of the same year he boldly joined the annual Hajj (pilgrimage to Mecca), and successfully accomplished a dangerous exploit which no other Englishman had achieved without disguise of person or of nationality. In 1868 he passed by Aleppo and the Euphrates to Shiráz, where he resided some months in 1869, employed in making himself thoroughly acquainted with the scenes and life of Persia, to carry out more efficiently the great work of his life, a metrical and literal translation of the chief poems of Háfiz, which, during fifteen years, had been under revision. But on 14 March 1875, before the manuscripts had received their final corrections, his life was abruptly terminated by disease, induced or hastened by the wear of constant change of climate, exposure in mountain exploration, and by an accident in an attempt to ascend the Matterhorn. He died in London, and was buried at Ramsgate. As a traveller he had great powers of endurance, he was a fair draughtsman, and as a linguist of unsurpassed ability; his varied accomplishments being also united with the happiest power of lucidly explaining the most abstruse theories of metaphysics and etymology, which his extensive reading had mastered. Besides a few pamphlets, he published the translation of Háfiz (posthumously issued), which include a variety of chronograms two centuries prior to their European introduction.

== Notes ==
=== References ===
- "Bicknell, Herman" . Dictionary of National Biography. London: Smith, Elder & Co. 1885–1900.
- Hillmann, Michael C. (1989). Bicknell, Herman. Encyclopedia Iranica online.
