= The Divân of Hafez =

Collection of classical Persian poems written by Hafez

The Divân
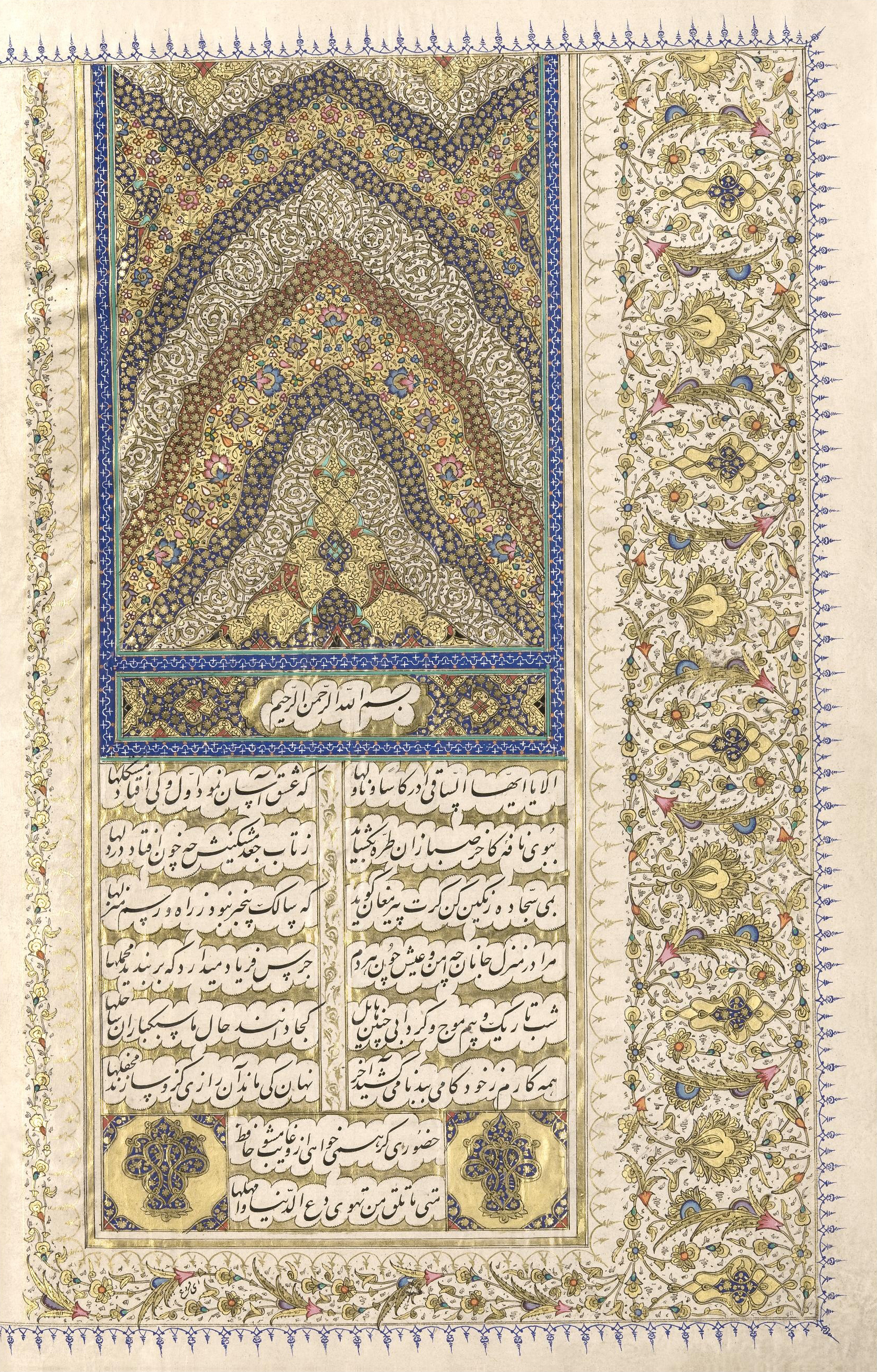
- The first page of the manuscript of the Divân of Hafez (1899)
- Author: Hafez
- Language: Persian
- Series: Persian literature
- Genre: Lyric literature
- Publication date: 14th century
- Publication place: Iran
- Media type: Book

The Divân of Hafez (Persian: دیوان حافظ) is a collection of poems written by the Iranian poet Hafez. Most of these poems are in Persian, but there are some macaronic language poems (in Persian and Arabic) and a completely Arabic ghazal. The most important part of this Divân is the ghazals. Poems in other forms such as qetʿe, qasida, mathnawi and rubaʿi are as well included in the Divân. There is no evidence that Hafez's lost poems might have constituted the majority of his poetic output, and in addition, Hafez was very famous during his lifetime. Therefore he cannot have been a prolific poet. The number of ghazals that are generally accepted is less than 500: 495 ghazals in Ghazvini and Ghani edition, 486 ghazals in Natel-Khanlari's second edition and 484 ghazals in the Sayeh edition.

== Overview ==
The Divân of Hafez was probably compiled for the first time after his death by Mohammad Golandam. However, some unconfirmed reports indicate that Hafez published his Divân in 1368 (770 AH), meaning it was edited more than twenty years before his death, but no such version exists. There are several famous manuscripts in Iran, Europe and other places that belong to the second and third quarters of the 15th century, from thirty to sixty years after the poet's death, and the most authoritative of them are less than 500 ghazals. Subsequent versions contain 600 ghazals and more. Parviz Natel-Khanlari's second edition of the manuscript contains 486 ghazals. Derived manuscripts, sometimes describing Persian, Turkish, or Urdu, continued over the next four centuries. In Hafez's poem, 23 rhythms and 10 prosody metres are used.

The Divān or parts of it have been translated into many different languages including English, Urdu, Punjabi, Sindhi, Arabic, French, German, Russian, Armenian, Bulgarian, Czech, Chinese, Danish, Dutch, Finnish, Greek, Hungarian, Italian, Latin, Lithuanian, Norwegian, Polish, Portuguese, Romanian, Serbian, Swedish, Spanish and Turkish. The Divān and its excerpts have been arranged as lyrics for singing in several languages.

According to Yarshater, "No other Persian poet has been the subject of so much analysis, commentary, and interpretation. Nor has any poet influenced the course of post-fourteenth century Persian lyrics as much as he has. [...] In no other Persian poet can be found such a combination of fertile imagination, polished diction, apt choice of words, and silken melodious expressions." According to experts and cataloguers, during the four hundred years of compiling the Divān in the last decade of the 14th century until its publication in Calcutta in 1791 AD (1206 AH), this book has been written and copied more than any other literary work. The number of manuscripts of The Divān of Hafez is about 1700, which is scattered not only in Iran, but also in the geographical region of the Persian language and among all social classes and even rulers. In terms of the size of its Persian-speaking audiences, it has surpassed all the great works of Persian literature.

What has been published from Hafez's poems includes incomplete, complete, non-critical and critical collections, lithography, calligraphy, facsimile and typography. At least 300 printed copies of the Divān have been cited since 1988, and more have been published since then. Hafez's influence on the lives of Iranians can be seen in the continuation of the popularity of his poems from previous generations to the present day, and the use of these poems in everyday conversations. His work has been reflected in the works of an exceptional number of calligraphers, painters, carpet weavers and artists.

== Translations ==
An early translation of the Divan was published in 1891 in Calcutta by Henry Wilberforce Clarke.

Dick Davis has written an essay on the challenges he faced in trying to translate the Divan.
