= National Library and Archives of Iran =

Library in Tehran, Iran

Coordinates: 35°45′8.53″N 51°26′3.67″E

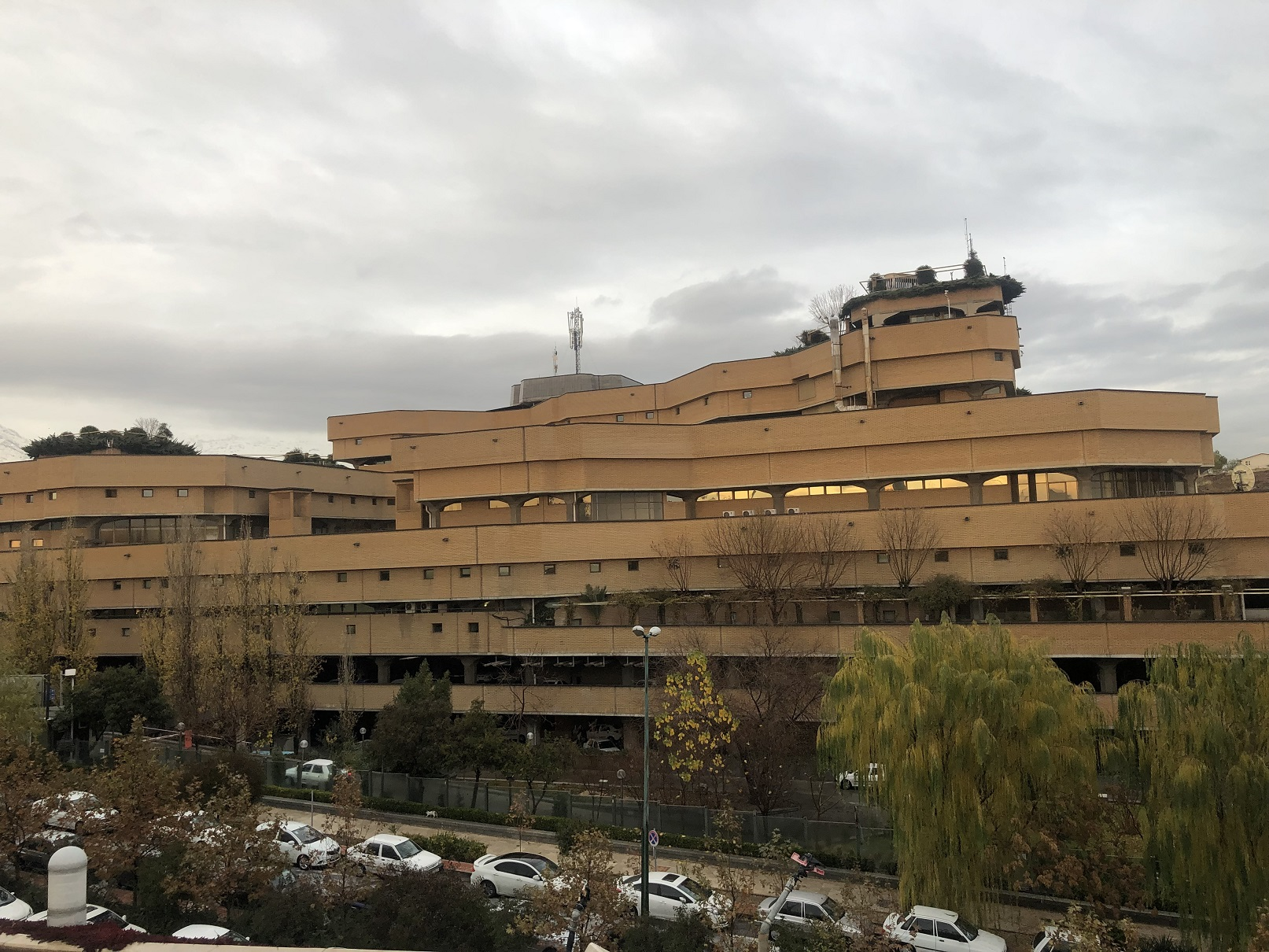
- Location: Shahid Haghani Expressway, Davoodiyeh, Vanak Square, Tehran, Iran
- Type: National library
- Established: 1937 (89 years ago)
- Architect: Yousef Shariatzadeh
- Branches: 1 (Shahid Bahonar Street, Niavaran, Tehran)

Collection
- Items collected: Books, journals, newspapers, magazines, sound and music recordings, patents, databases, maps, stamps, prints, drawings, and manuscripts
- Size: 15,000,000
- Legal deposit: Yes

Access and use
- Access requirements: Open to anyone with a need to use the collections and services

Other information
- Budget: 44 billion Iranian Rial (1,446,845 million USD)
- Director: Gholam Reza Amirkhani
- Website: www.nlai.ir

The National Library and Archives of Iran (NLAI; Persian: سازمان اسناد و کتابخانه ملی ایران (ساکما), romanized: Sazman-e Asnad va Ketabkhaneh-ye Melli-ye Iran) or the National Library of the Islamic Republic of Iran is the national library of Iran located in Tehran, with twelve branches across the country. The NLAI is an educational, research, scientific, and service institute authorized by the Islamic Consultative Assembly. Its president is appointed by the President of Iran. The NLAI is the largest library in the Middle East and includes more than fifteen-million items in its collections.

On 19 March 2024 an eyewitness discovered that some ten thousand National Library publications eg. pre-1979 revolution magazines held by the library and archives organization were destroyed secretly. The government claimed they were "old and unreadable".

Deputy Head of National Library, Esmat Momeni, in an interview with the Islamic Republic News Agency (IRNA), denied news report on annihilation of old archival publications and stated:

No annihilation of old archival publications has taken place in the National Library and will not. What has happened is a common procedure in classification of sources, such as periodicals.

She noted that contrary to what is claimed, there were neither exquisite and valuable books and publications, no journals and books related to the years before the victory of the Islamic Revolution among the destroyed collection. she also emphasized that the only publications destroyed are those mentioned above.

Moreover, there were no demand for those publications and they were all highly damaged, torn, infected and moldy which caused physical harm to library staff who work in repositories and store rooms.

Momeni added that all these publications went under laboratory tests. The results showed that these publications contained contamination two times more than what is considered as the permissible standard and in the meantime these publications were not among old archival publications required by the library.

She said the same procedure was in force in the previous years as well. For example, the surplus publications in the years 2013, 2017 and 2018 A.D, were annihilated after they went through the mentioned procedures and if they were diagnosed as unusable and worn-out resources.

== History ==
Iran's national library and national archives began as separate institutions. In 2002, the two merged to form the National Library and Archives of Iran, but continue to operate in two independent buildings.

=== Library ===
The emergence of the National Library and Archives of Iran was a gradual process preceded by a long work on book collection.

In 1864, Iran's first modern library was established at the Dar ul-Funun, an educational institution that trained military personnel and engineers. Under Mozaffar ad-Din Shah, Iranians started to explore Western culture thanks to the diplomatic and economic ties established with the West. In 1897, a scientific society, which actively supported and disseminated Western educational values, was founded in the Iranian capital, Tehran. The work of this society led to the creation of the National Scientific Library in 1898. The college's small library collection became the cornerstone of the National Library.

At the end of 1934, Mehdi Bayani (the first director of the National Scientific Library) suggested that Minister of Science Ali-Asghar Hekmat created the National Library of Iran. Ali Asghar Hekmat noticed that despite several buildings occupying the old military base in central Tehran, there was still unused land. While supervising the construction of the Ancient Iran Museum, he conceived the idea of establishing a national library on this vacant area. After approaching Reza Shah, he secured approval for the allocation of the land. Although Hekmat had commissioned André Godard to design the national library, Maxime Siroux's records suggest that he designed the building, likely under Godard's direction, and it closely resembled the museum's structure. Additionally, a Chronogram poem by Habib Yaghmai, a poet and literary scholar, adorned the building, while Iranian brick patterns decorated the entrance. The book collections of the National Scientific Library, the Royal Library, the Aziz Khan Library, and the Russian Credit Bank (a total of 30,000 publications) were moved there. The library was opened on August 25, 1937. This day is considered the date when the modern National Library of Iran started its work.

In the second half of 1950, the National Library of Iran was running out of space, and an additional building was constructed. After the Iranian Revolution, the library was reorganized and enlarged. It was merged with the Tehran Book Processing Center and the Islamic Revolution Cultural Documentation Organization into the National Library and Documentation Organization. In 2002, it was joined by the National Archives of Iran, turning into the National Library and Archives of the Islamic Republic of Iran. Currently, this organization occupies two separate buildings: the new building of the National Library of Iran and the building of the National Archives of Iran.

In 1963, the Center for Islamic and Iranian Studies was founded in the National Library of Iran. Its task is to procure Islam-related publications in all languages except Persian and Arabic. This center keeps books in various languages published more than 400 years ago, as well as journals and dissertations.

In 1994, the organization for the commissioning of state public buildings of the Ministry of Housing and Urban Development of Tehran held a national competition to design a new building for the National Library of Iran, since the library's collection had been expanding, and it already occupied several buildings throughout the city at the time. Andre Godard, the French archaeologist and architect who designed the Museum of Ancient Iran, was commissioned to design a library building that would look similar to the museum, since they were supposed to be located next to each other.

The new building was constructed between 1996 and 2004 in Abbasabad, Tehran. Yousef Shariatzadeh (Persian: یوسف شریعت‌زاده), Mohsen Mirheydar, and Yadollah Razaghi of Pirraz Consulting Planners, Architects and Engineers designed the building. which cost US$53,930,769. It was dedicated on March 1, 2004, by Seyed Mohammad Khatami, then president of the National and Collective Documents and Library, in a ceremony attended by foreign writers, publishers, and ambassadors. The new library building won a design award from the Environmental Engineering and Architecture Forum in 1997.

The new building of the National Library of Iran has beendesigned to unite the library's various departments at a single site. The library's collection includes about 7 million units, including over 2,500 modern magazines and newspapers. The collection of ancient and rare books contains works by Iranian authors on philosophy, Sufism, Islam, medicine, and astronomy in Persian and Arabic.

In addition to reading halls and book storage rooms, the library also houses exhibition areas, a bookstore, a cafe, and a prayer room. The library often holds scientific and educational events and organizes various courses, workshops, and seminars.

The National Library also includes twelve provincial branches: Boushehr, Ghazvin, Hamadan, Kerman, Isfahan, Mashhad, Rasht, Sari, Shiraz, Tabriz, Yazd, and Zahedan.

Isfahan officially Central Region including Kohgiluyeh Buyerahmad and Chaharmahal Bakhtiari keeps 7 -15 million documents.

=== Archives ===
During the Qajar period, especially under Fath Ali Shah Qajar in the early 19th-century, documents were kept in the archives of the Biotat Office at the court. During the time of Nasser al-Din Shah in the mid to later 19th-century, political documents were stored at the Ministry of Foreign Affairs, and financial documents at the office of Mirza Yusuf Khan Mostofi al-Mamalik. In 1899, the Ministry of Foreign Affairs started following European archival methods by consolidating its archives and implementing the principles of document preservation.

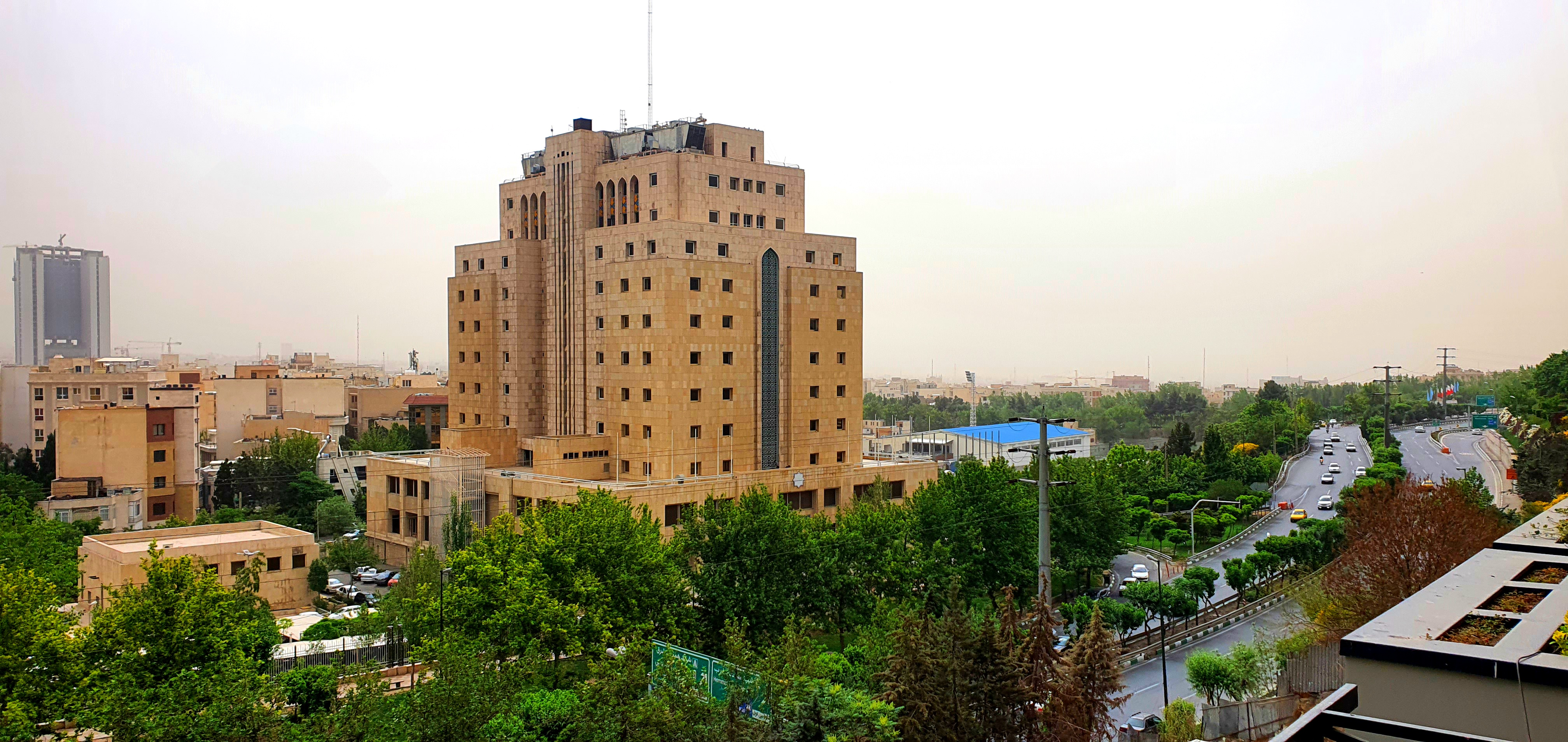
National Archive building

In 1966, a bill to create a National Archive Organization of Iran was introduced. In 1970, the National Assembly approved the law establishing this organization. National records are, All records, correspondence, offices, files, photographs, maps, clichés, charts, films, tape recorders and other documents that have been prepared by the government or have reached the government and are constantly in the possession of the government.

== Facilities ==
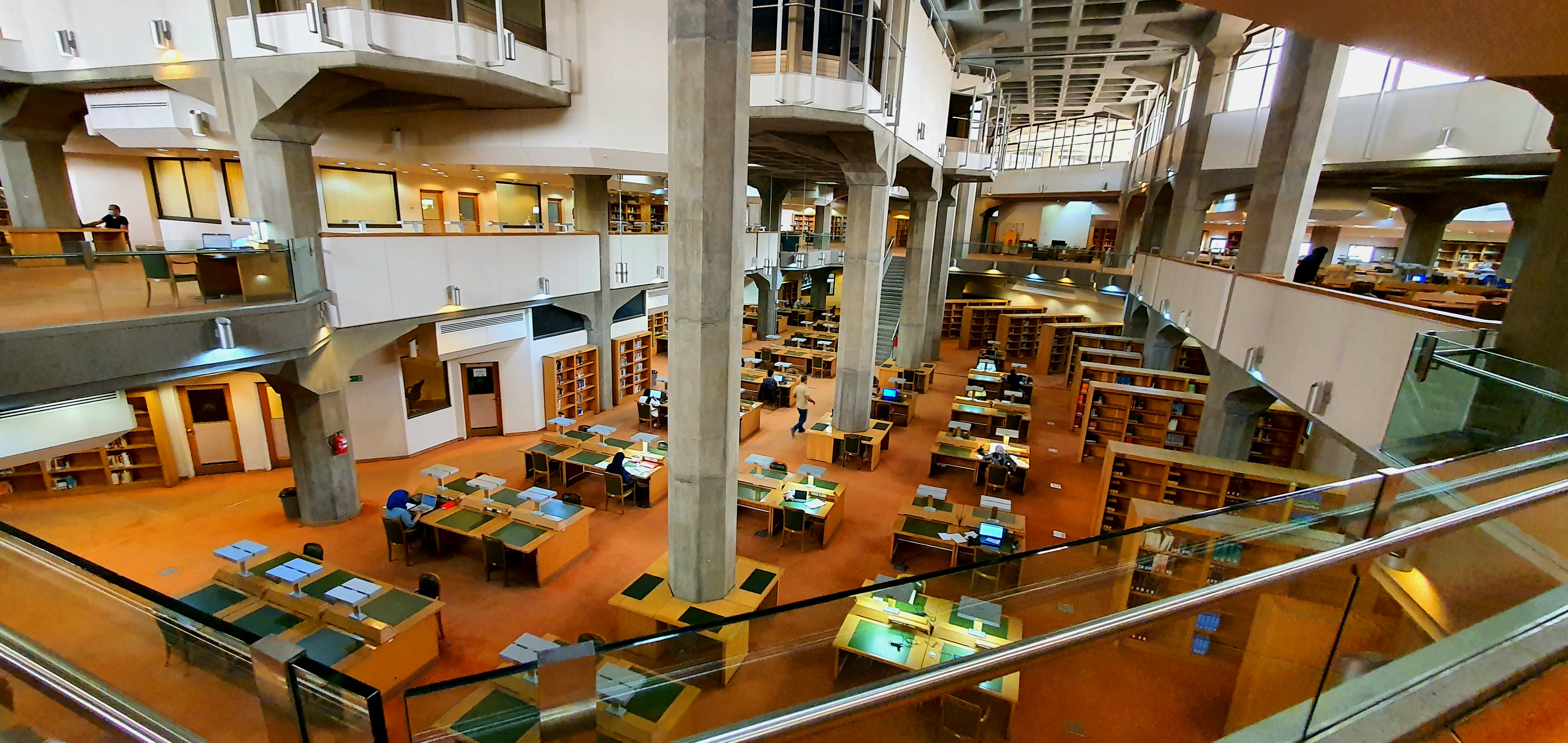
National Library first floor study hall

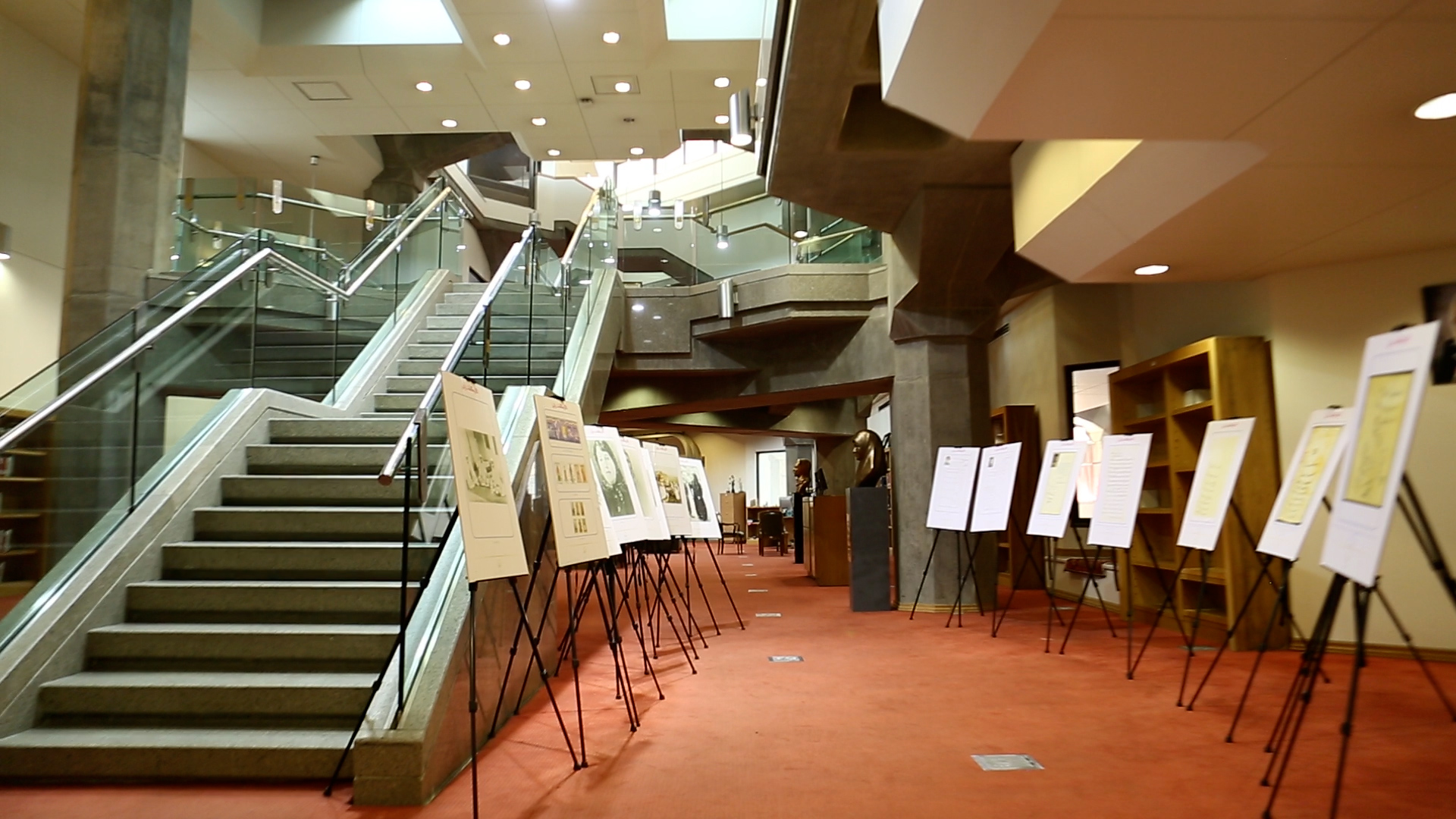
National Library Women Studies Hall Entrance

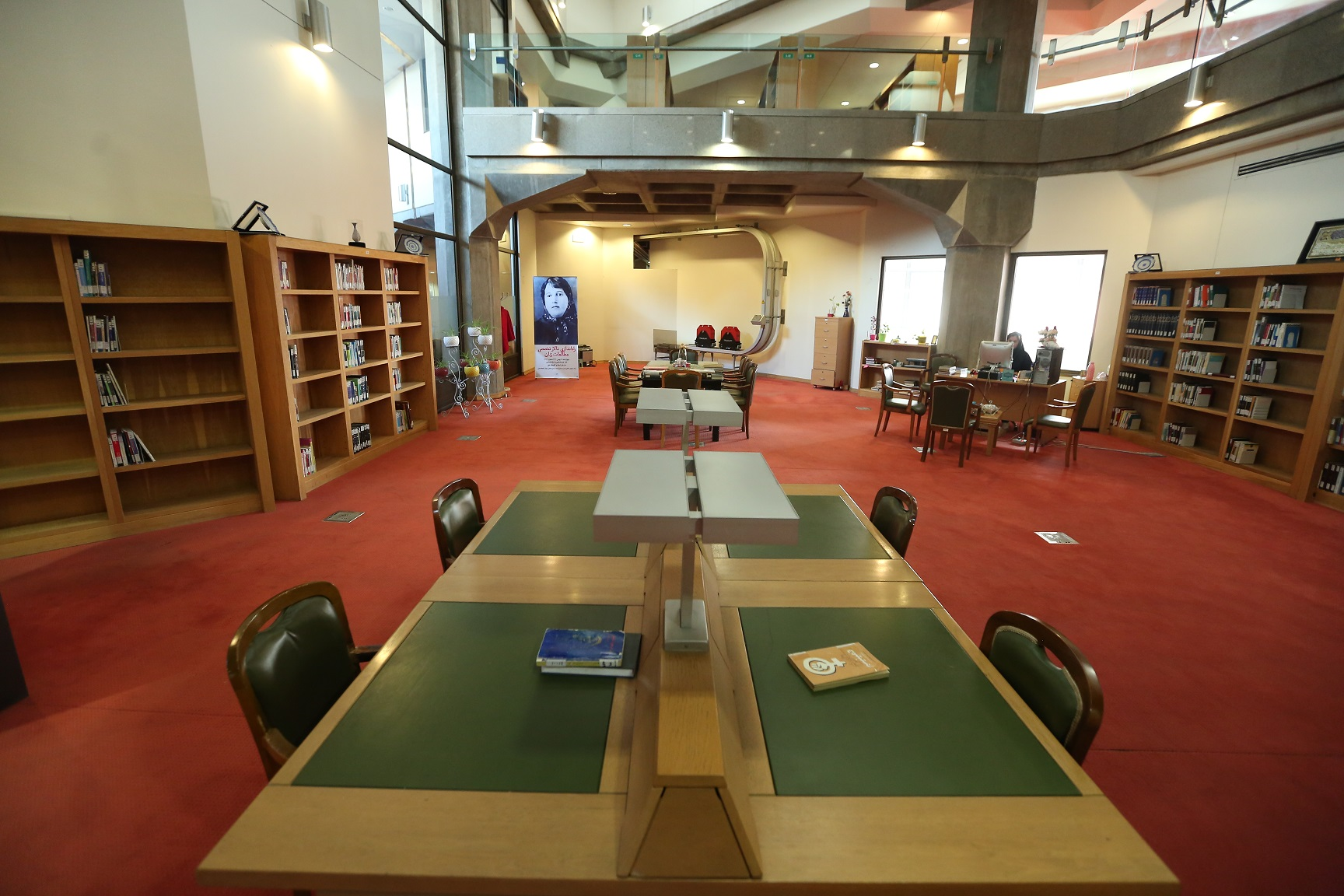
National Library Women Studies Hall

The eight-story library building has 11,695 square metres (125,880 sq ft). It is constructed of concrete that can withstand level nine-magnitude earthquakes. The overall design is organic and creates an intimate and inviting atmosphere.

The building consists of fifteen halls:

- Kharazmi Hall: rare books and manuscripts
- Khajeh Nasir al-Din Tusi Hall: links
- Kamal al-Molk Forum: non-book resources
- Ibn Nandim Hall: reference and bibliography
- Razi Hall: science and technology
- Ibn Sina Hall: humanities
- Farabi Hall: social sciences and arts
- Mohaddes Armavi Hall: Iranian Studies and Islam Studies
- Rudaki Hall: special section for the enlightened and the disabled
- Kamaluddin Behzad Hall: non-book resources
- Parvin Etesami Hall: women's hall
- Digital Forum
- Public Library: titles of Saadi and Hafez
- Children's Library
- Museum of Books and Documentary Heritage of Iran

== Collections ==
Smallest octagonal Quran (قرآن هشت‌ضلعی)

The National Archives and Library of Iran houses three major collections: National Library, National Archive, and Digital.

The National Library incorporates collections from many older libraries. The majority of the collection consists of books and manuscripts covering the writings of Iranian scholars in the fields of literature, history, philosophy, mysticism, jurisprudence, medicine, and astronomy.

According to the Deputy of the National Library in 2019, the collection included:

- 2,841,665 books
- 301,782 dissertations
- 609,053 non-book resources, including photographs and CDs.
- 4,000,000 magazines in 140,619 volumes, including 24,997 Latin and Arabic publications
- 298,150 books for children and adolescents
- 23,323 books for the blind, including books-on-tape, books-on-CD, and around 1,000 Braille books
- 775 magazines for the blind and visually impaired
- 55,000 old books, including 28,158 manuscripts and more than 26,000 lithographs featuring old lead printing
- An Iranian Studies collection that includes 80,410 books, 2,300 dissertations, and 6000 journals
- An Islam Studies collection with 8,203,238 books, magazines, and tapes
- The library has fourteen halls with fifteen million library items.

== Publications ==
In 1962, the National Library took over the publication of the Iranian National Bibliography (Ketab-shenasi-e Melli-e Iran). It issued this annual publication between 1962 and 1966, changing to monthly and quarterly in 1969. The NLAI also publishes a Biannual Journal of Oral History Research.

== See also ==
- Central Library of Astan Quds Razavi
- List of libraries in Iran
- List of national libraries
- International rankings of Iran
