= André Godard =

French archeologist and architect

André Godard (21 January 1881 – 31 July 1965) was a French archaeologist, architect and historian of French and Middle Eastern Art. He served as the director of the Iranian Archeological Service for many years.

== Life ==
Godard was a graduate of the École des Beaux-Arts of Paris, he studied Middle Eastern archaeology, particularly that of Iran, and later became known for designing the National Museum of Iran, where he was appointed inaugural director in 1936. He was also instrumental in the design of the University of Tehran campus.

He made his first trip to the Middle East in 1910 with Henri Violle. Together, they began to excavate the ancient ruins of Samarra, located in modern-day Iraq. The ruins were fully excavated a few years later by German-born archaeologist Ernst Herzfeld. Godard returned to his architectural studies in 1912, focusing on Islamic architecture of Egypt.

After World War I, Godard married Yeda Reuilly. The Delegation of French Archaeology in Afghanistan was subsequently founded in 1922, so Godard and his new wife accompanied the organization to not-yet-excavated regions. They consequently studied Bâmiyân, which was later permitted to be exhibited at the central Buddhist shrine of the Guimet Museum, in 1925.

In 1895, the Qajar government permitted France to excavate in Iran. Five years later, they granted France exclusive rights for all archaeological excavations in Iran indefinitely. In 1923, Reza Khan visited Susa, a major French excavation site in Iran. He was outraged by the sight of a large European castle with a French flag, suggesting militaristic intentions. Reports of French looting further fueled his discontent. Upon becoming shah in 1925, his court minister, Teymourtash, proposed ending the French excavation monopoly and, as a compromise, appointing a French director for a new archaeological institute in Iran. This led to the abolition of the French monopoly in 1927, with Andre Godard appointed as director. The Iranian Parliament voted on April 29, 1928, and approved Godard's five-year contract starting November 18, 1928. Every five years, Parliament extended his contract, mandating monthly educational meetings with Iranian archaeologists and the publication of new archaeological discoveries. The IAS was intended to mark the end of the French monopoly over excavation in Iran. Godard held the title of Director from 1928 to 1953, then again from 1956 to 1960. Reza Shah also appointed him director of the National Museum of Iran (Muze-ye Irân-e Bāstān).

Ali Asghar Hekmat commissioned Godard to design the University of Tehran, which was to be situated in Jalaliyah Garden, spanning over 200,000 square meters. Initially, Godard delegated most of the design work, including the dissection hall, to Siroux. In 1935, the Ebne Sina Medical School became the first building to open, adorned with Nezami's poems celebrating knowledge. Conservative clerics vehemently opposed the establishment of the medical school, particularly the construction of the dissection hall, but advocates like Hekmat ensured its realisation. The sixth building at the University of Tehran was for the Faculty of Fine Arts, designed by Godard. Godard served as the Honorary Dean of the faculty, overseeing key decisions and faculty appointments, although he did not engage in active teaching.

Andre Godard's sole publication, "The Art of Iran," categorizes Iranian artworks and architecture by dynasties, spanning from ancient to Islamic periods. Additionally, as the head of Iran's archaeological service, he, along with colleagues including his wife Yedda Godard, Maxime Siroux, and numerous Iranian scholars, began publishing the annual magazine "The Journal of the Archaeological Service (Athare Iran)" in 1936. This publication featured French essays on Iran's art and architecture, later translated and released in Iran in 1989. In one essay, Godard praised Iranians for their innovative architectural techniques, expressing regret that Iran's structures weren't more enduring, as it could have been a global architectural museum. Another essay poignantly describes Godard's admiration for his simple house in Jamal Abad, highlighting its traditional Iranian architecture. Godard disputed the idea that Gothic architecture originated from Iranian architecture, a theory proposed by scholars like Marcel-Auguste Dieulafoy. He criticized Dieulafoy as a "romantic archaeologist" for attributing various elements, including Gothic architecture, to Iran. In another essay, Godard claimed that Iranians in the 14th century imitated groined vaults from Western architecture. However, Karim Pirnia countered this argument, asserting that the origins of pointed arches in Iran can be traced back to ancient buildings like the Elamid and Medes temples. Pirnia argued that the Iranian architectural system predated Gothic architecture.

David Williamson, the American Charge d'affaires in Iran, described Godard as possessing exceptional talent and tact, making a favourable impression on both Iranian and foreign societies in Tehran. However, Arthur Pope, an American archaeologist, viewed Godard as a rival and criticised him as unfit for directing antiquities in Iran. Pope believed that Godard lacked the expertise needed for the restoration and excavation of Iranian artifacts, warning that Iranian art would suffer if entrusted to him. Americans felt that Godard favoured French interests, blocking American-led excavations in Persepolis, Ray, and Lorestan, and assigning key sites such as Shahpour and Kazeroun to the French.

In 1930, Iran passed its first antiquities law, drafted by Godard, Herzfeld, and Pope, with amendments from Minister of Education Yahya Khan Gharagouzelou. Godard played a significant role in identifying buildings to be preserved as cultural heritage. During his tenure, Godard was responsible for the restoration of major historic monuments of Iran, such as the Friday Mosque, the Shah Mosque, and Mosque of Sheikh Lutfallah of Isfahan among others. Using his directorships, he organized large excavations of bronzes of Luristan, Persepolis and Isfahan. He was also instrumental, together with fellow architect Maxime Siroux, in the design of the National Library of Iran, Tomb of Hafez, and Central Pardis, the main campus of the University of Tehran.

Godard's architectural creation, the Tomb of Hafez (known as Hafeziyeh) in Shiraz, was nestled in an ancient cemetery within a building complex. He took great care to preserve the historical structures surrounding the tomb, showcasing the site's evolution over time while introducing innovative elements. Drawing inspiration from historic monumental tombs in gardens and Zand architecture in Shiraz, Godard consciously adopted the circular plan and domed columned space characteristic of Iranian tomb towers, which he extensively discussed in his writings and lectures. Construction of the tomb, overseen by Ali Sami, commenced in 1938 and was finalized in 1940.

There are accusations against Andre Godard regarding the smuggling of art objects out of Iran. While he was known as an enthusiastic collector of Iranian art and artifacts, the sources of these objects and whether he had the right to sell them remain uncertain. Records indicate that Godard sold Iranian artifacts to the Louvre Museum in 1931, including 160 ancient Iranian bronze objects for 92,800 Francs. Mohsen Moghaddam, a Professor of Art History at the University of Tehran and an archaeologist, criticized Godard for purchasing fake Iranian bronze artifacts for the Ancient Iran Museum using Iranian state funds. Iranian scholars suspected that Godard sold the original artifacts to the Louvre. In 1948, Godard, assisted by his wife, organized an exhibition of Iranian artifacts at the Cernuschi Museum in Paris.

During World War II Godard opposed the Vichy government of France and when the Vichy diplomatic representatives were expelled from Tehran in 1942, helped form the Free France Committee and later become the official diplomatic representative of the provisional government in Tehran. In this period his wife Yedda organized an information radio program on Free France which was broadcast on the Persian radio.

Godard returned to Paris in 1960, where he continued to write on Iranian art. He died in Paris on 31 July 1965.
