= Pahlavi High School =

Historic site in Bourjerd, Iran

- دبیرستان پهلوی
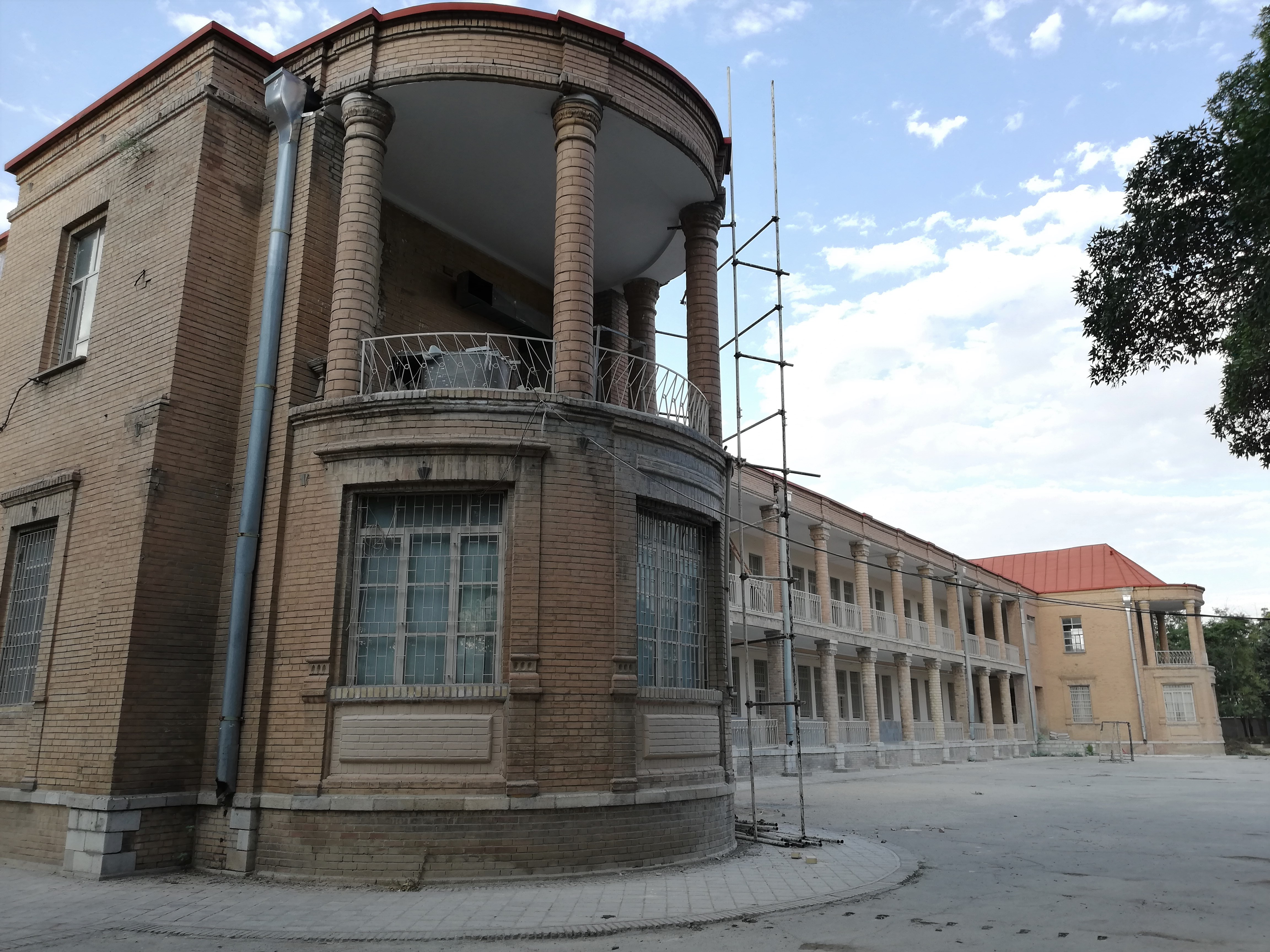

- Location within Iran
- Alternative names: Imam Khomeini High School

General information
- Status: Cultural
- Type: School
- Architectural style: European/Iranian
- Location: Borujerd, Iran
- Coordinates: 33.8922°N 48.7502°E
- Completed: 1936
- Owner: Ministry of Education

Technical details
- Floor count: 3

Pahlavi High School (Persian: دبیرستان پهلوی, dabirestan-e pahlavi), is a large historical school and tourist attraction in Borujerd, western Iran. Completed in 1936, the high school was one of the earliest modern schools built under Iranian king Reza Shah during Pahlavi dynasty. The monument was nationally registered as a protected historical site in 2008.

Pahlavi High School is located in South Hafez Street. The school was constructed in a garrison land of 14,000 square meters. Several buildings and schools have been added to this area in later dates.

The main building is made in three floors including a basement. Classes are distributed in ground floor and first floor. Each class opens in an indoor hall and outdoor balcony. The exterior design of the building is covered by bricks and the building has a shape similar to H. Two balconies are visible at the southern angle of the building. The high school has a gathering hall and laboratory.

== Architect ==
The original plan of Pahlavi School was provided by French architect Maxime Siroux but it was performed by Iranian architects and engineers.

== Gallery ==
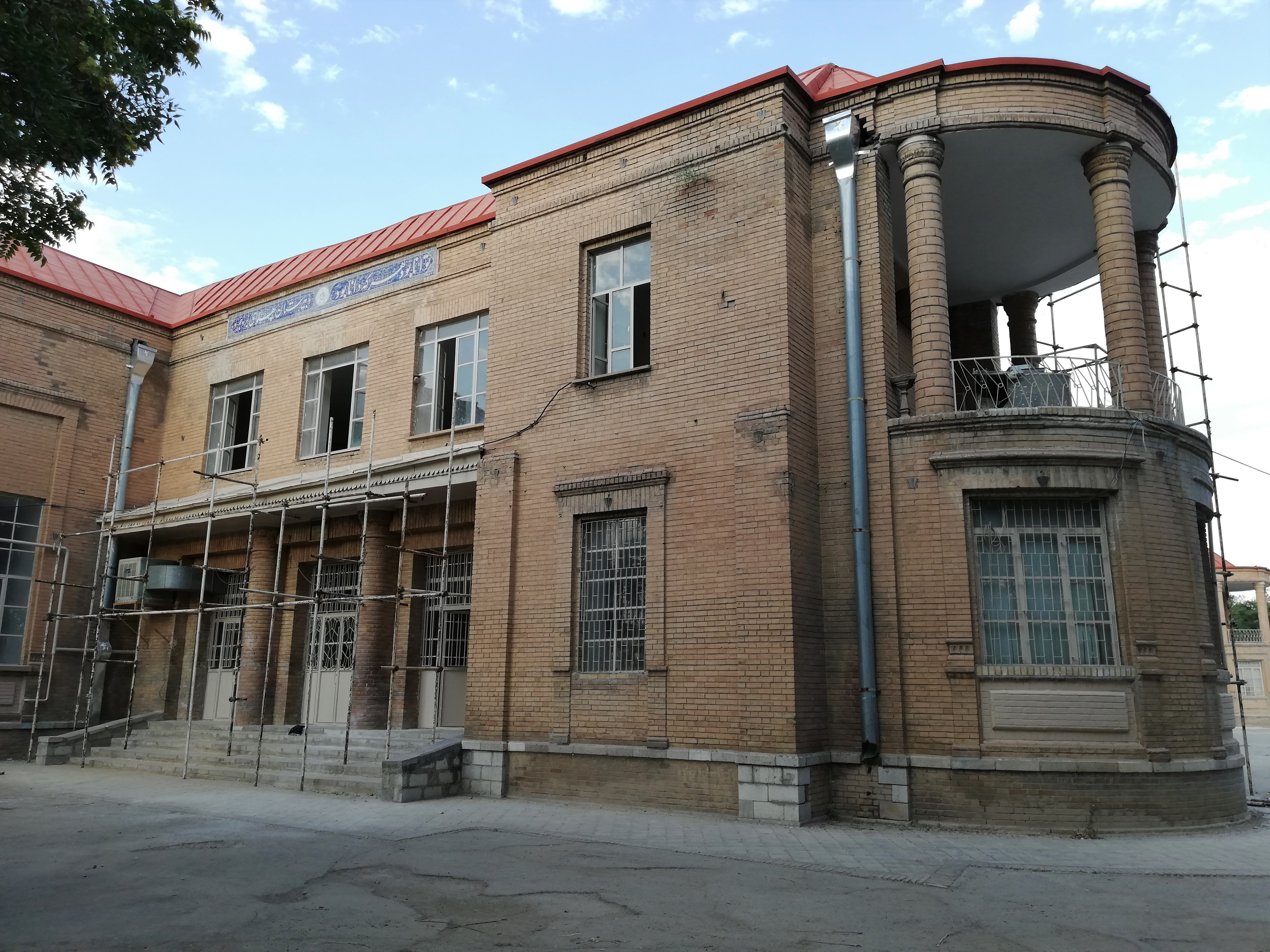
Western angle.

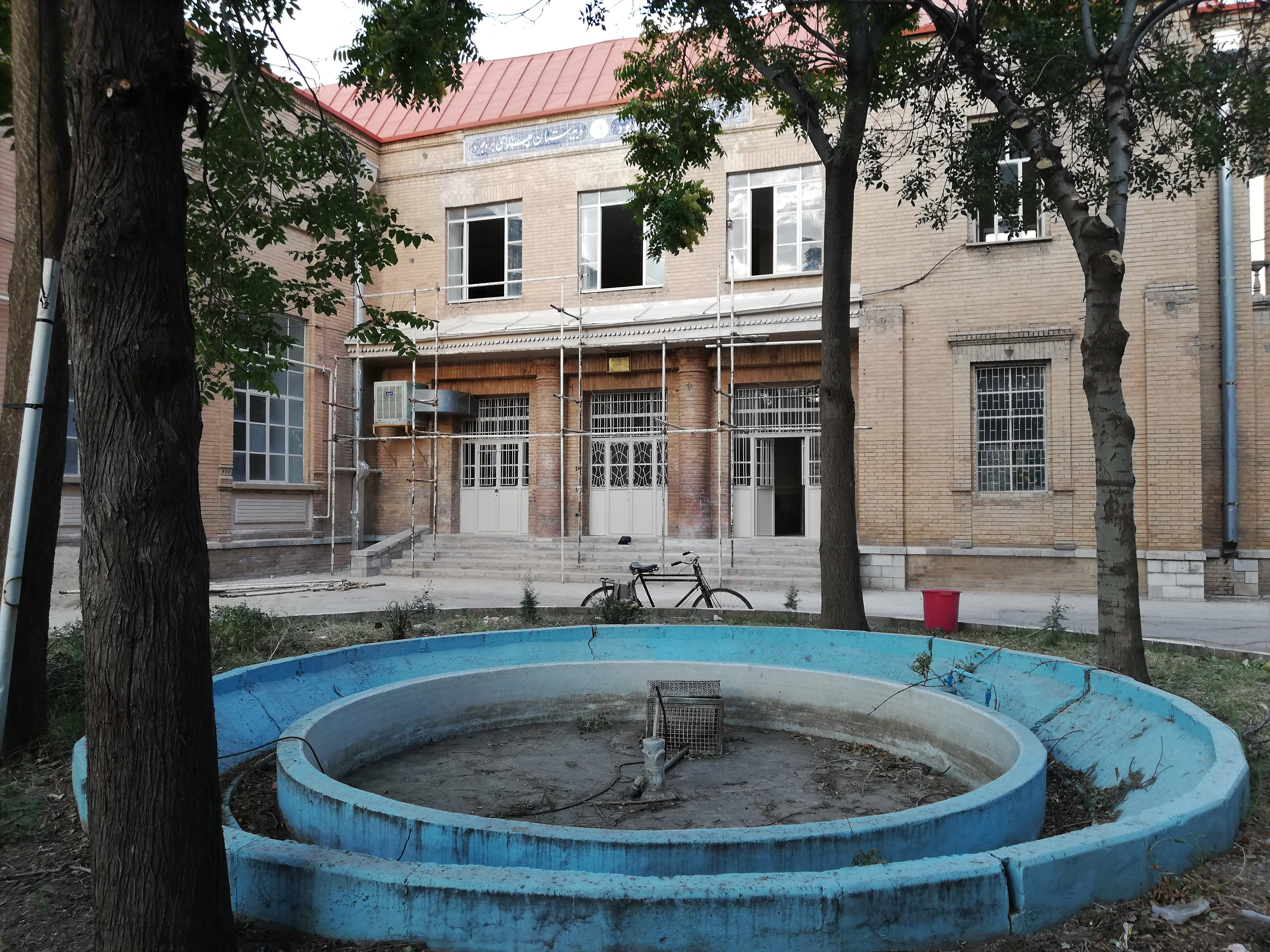
Entrance area.

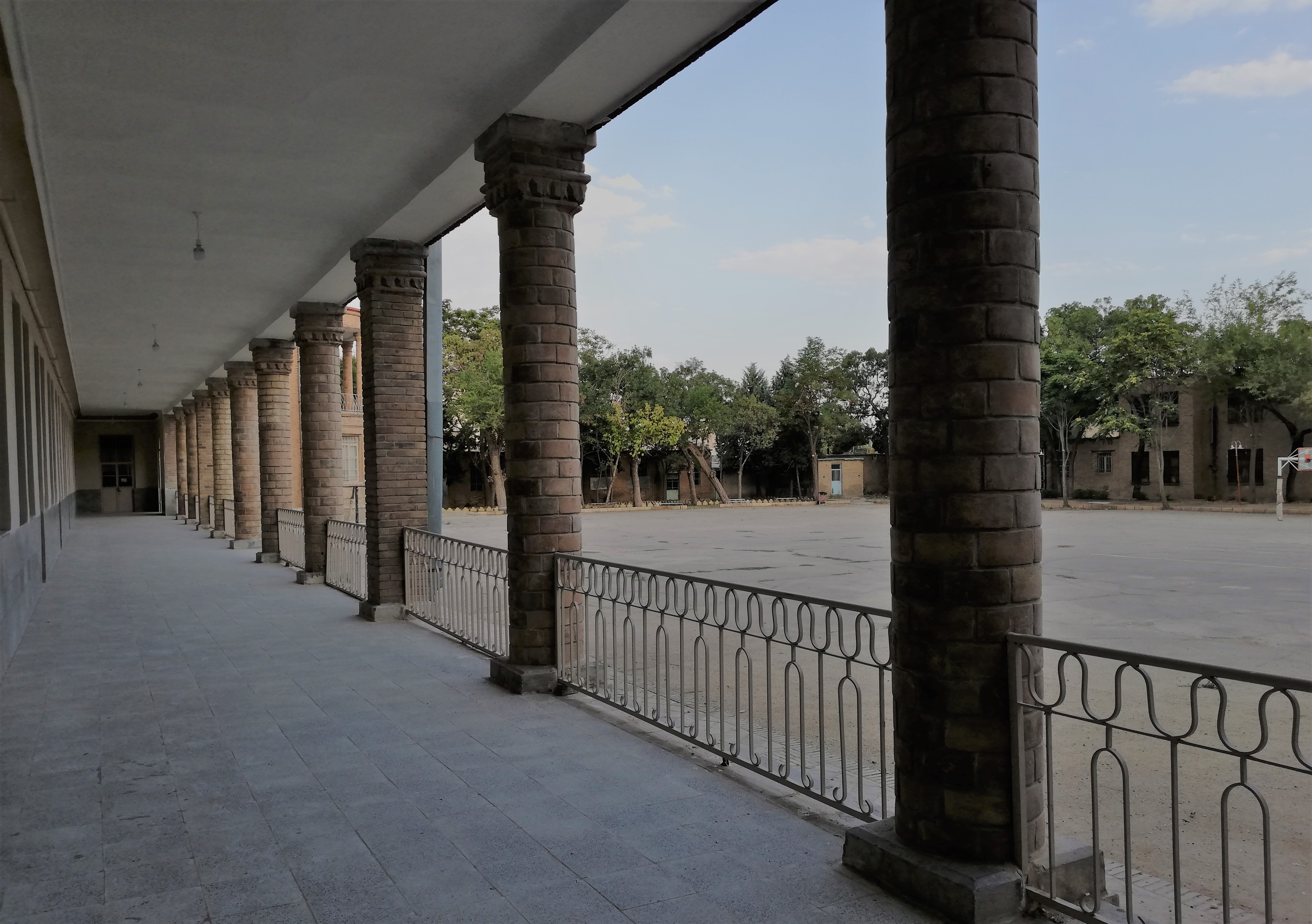
Columns and southern yard.

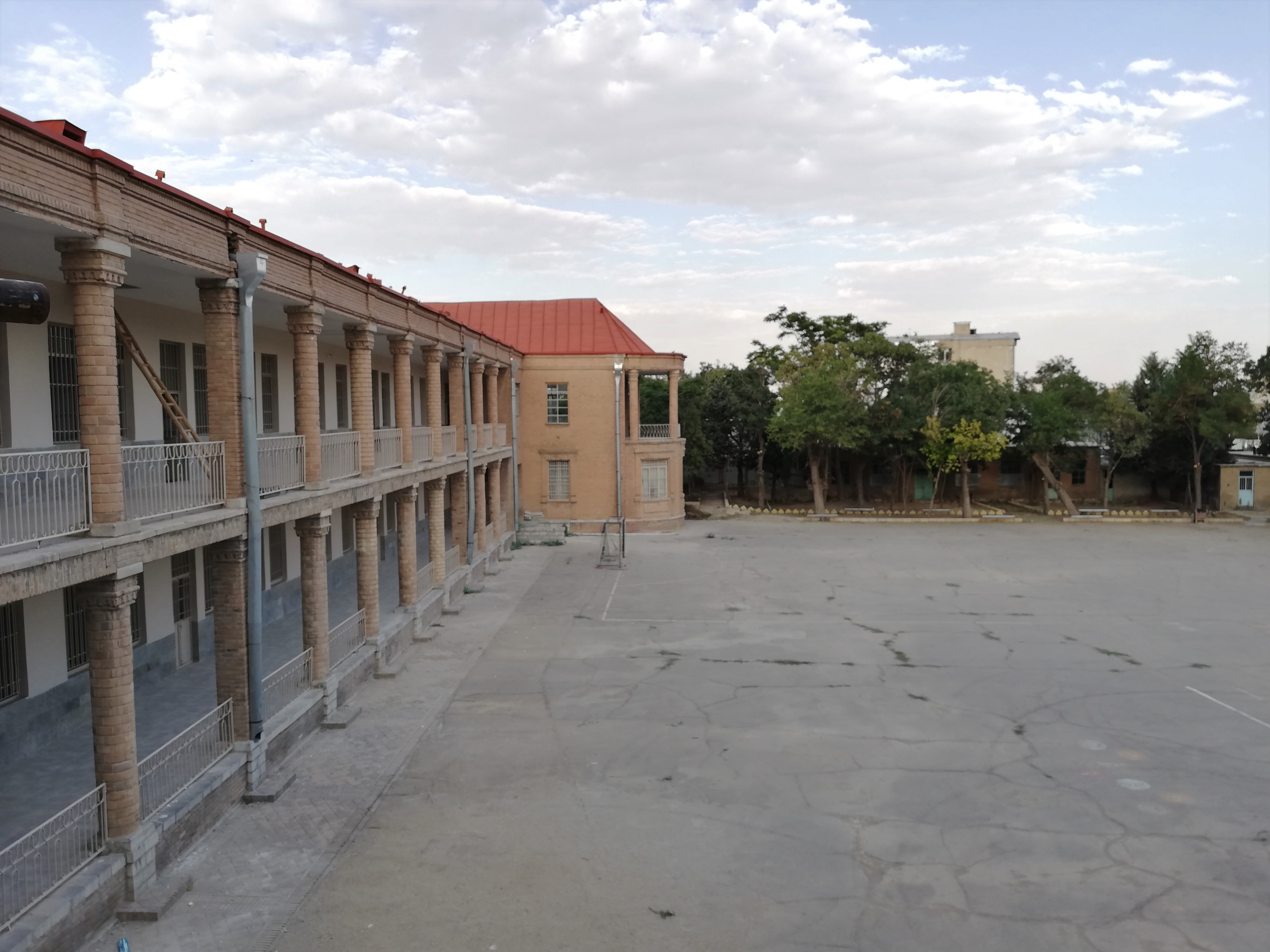
General view of the building.
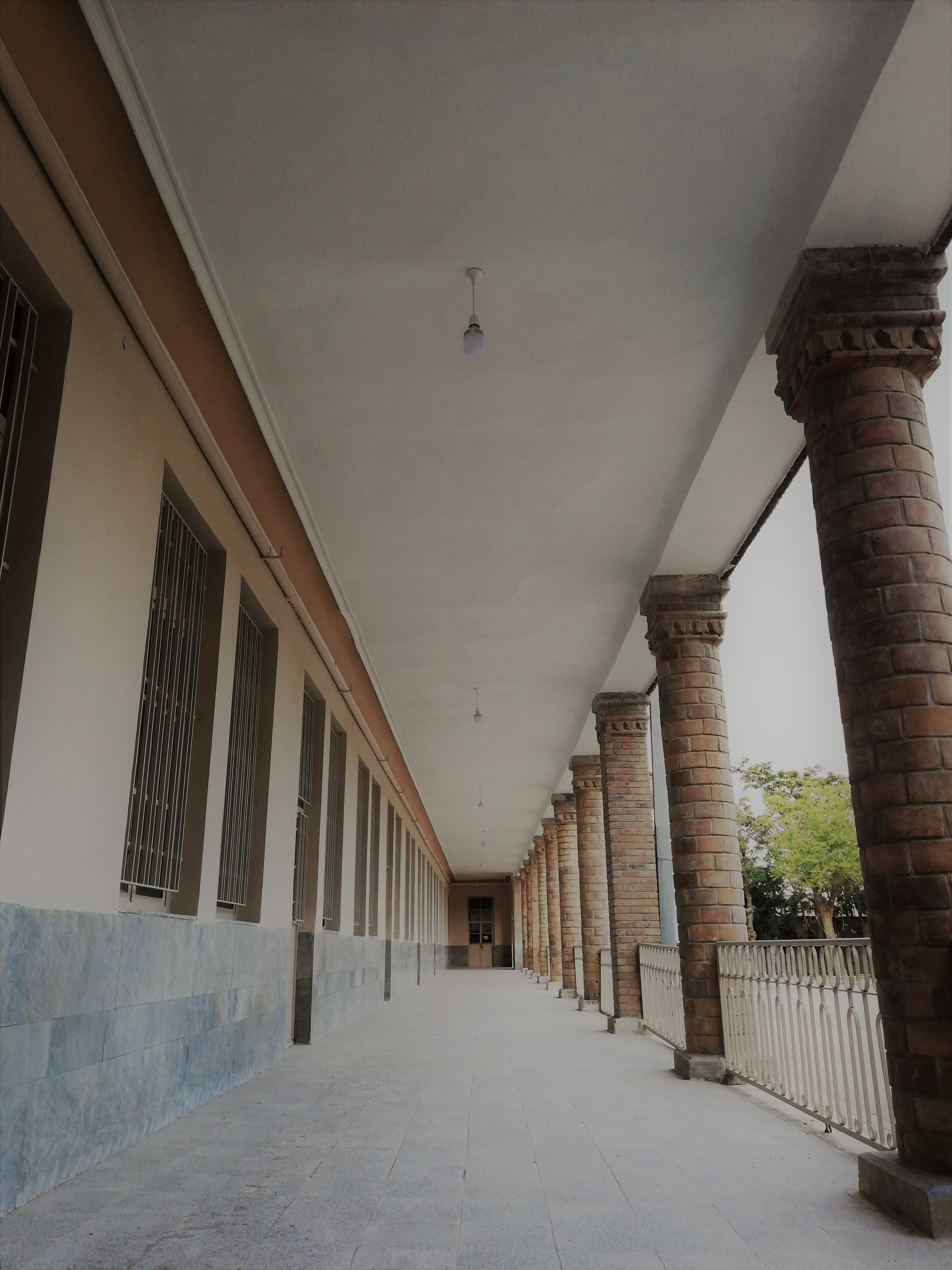
Balcony.

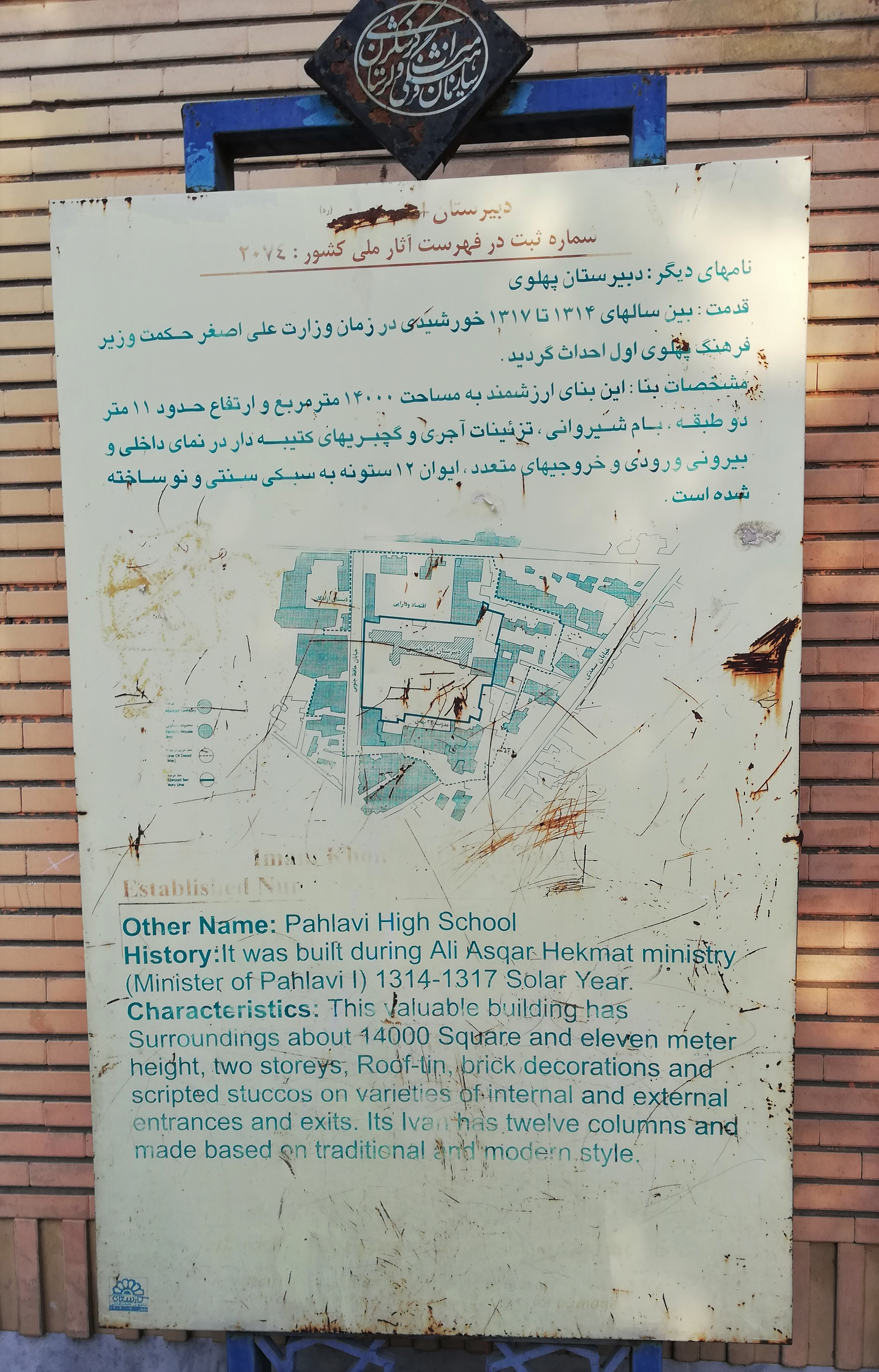
Visitor information.

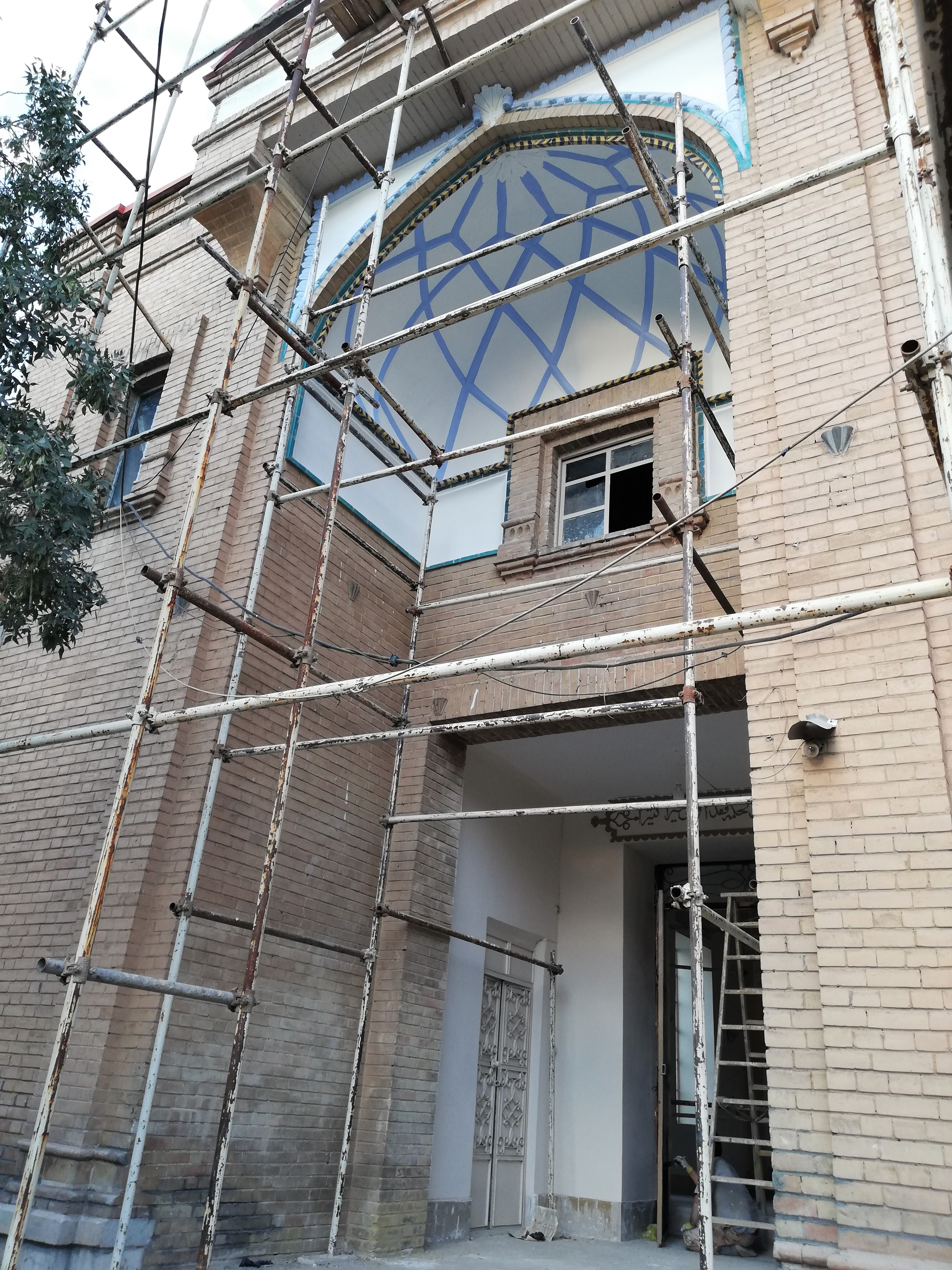
Gathering Hall entrance.
