= List of ambassadors of Iran to India =

Mohammad Fathali

Iran Ambassador to India
- Incumbent
- Assumed office 8 October 2025
- President: Masoud Pezeshkian

The Iranian ambassador in New Delhi is the official representative of the Government in Tehran to the Government of India.

== List of representatives ==
Diplomatic accreditation	Diplomatic accreditation Solar Hijri calendar	Ambassador	Persian language	Observations	List of heads of state of Iran	List of presidents of India	Term end	Term end Solar Hijri calendar
March 1948	1326	Ali Motamedi		Mohammad Reza Shah Pahlavi		December 1, 1948	1327	
January 21, 1949	1327	Mousa Nouri Esfandiari	Persian: موسی نوری اسفندیاری		Mohammad Reza Shah Pahlavi		January 1, 1952	1330
		Ali-Asghar Hekmat	Persian: علی‌اصغر حکمت		Mohammad Reza Shah Pahlavi	Rajendra Prasad		
		Morteza Moshfegh Kazemi	Persian: مرتضی مشفق کاظمی		Mohammad Reza Shah Pahlavi	Rajendra Prasad		
December 1, 1961	1340	Abdolhossein Masoud Ansari	Persian: عبدالحسین مسعود انصاری		Mohammad Reza Shah Pahlavi	Rajendra Prasad	March 21, 1963	1342
March 21, 1963	1342	Fereydoun Adamiyat	Persian: فریدون آدمیت		Mohammad Reza Shah Pahlavi	Sarvepalli Radhakrishnan	June 1, 1965	1344
August 1, 1965	1344	Jalal Abdoh	Persian: جلال عبده		Mohammad Reza Shah Pahlavi	Sarvepalli Radhakrishnan	October 1, 1968	1347
November 1, 1968	1347	Mohammad-Reza Amirteymour Kalali	Persian: محمدرضا امیرتیمور کلالی		Mohammad Reza Shah Pahlavi	Zakir Husain	September 1, 1971	1350
1971	1350	Gholamali Vahid Mazandarani	Persian: غلامعلی وحید مازندرانی		Mohammad Reza Shah Pahlavi	Varahagiri Venkata Giri		
		Mohammad Moazzami	Persian: محمد معظمی		Mohammad Reza Shah Pahlavi			
February 1, 1976	1354	Gholamreza Tajbakhsh Davallou	Persian: غلامرضا تاج‌بخش دولو		Mohammad Reza Shah Pahlavi	Fakhruddin Ali Ahmed	January 7, 1979	1357
February 1, 1979	1357	Naser Shirazi Rad	Persian: ناصر شیرازی راد	Chargé d'affaires		Neelam Sanjiva Reddy	November 1, 1979	1358
November 1, 1979	1358	Abolfazael Mojtahedi	Persian: ابوالفضائل مجتهدی			Neelam Sanjiva Reddy	August 1, 1981	1360
August 1, 1981	1360	Mohammad-Mehdi Akhoundzadeh	Persian: محمدمهدی آخوندزاده	Chargé d'affaires	Mohammad Ali Rajai	Neelam Sanjiva Reddy	July 1, 1982	1361
July 1, 1982	1361	Hassan Asadi Lari	Persian: حسن اسدی لاری		Ali Khamenei	Neelam Sanjiva Reddy	November 1, 1984	1363
November 1, 1984	1363	Ebrahim Behnam Dehkordi	Persian: ابراهیم بهنام دهکردی		Ali Khamenei	Zail Singh	July 1, 1988	1367
July 1, 1987	1367	Javid Ghorbanoghlou	Persian: جاوید قربان‌اوغلو	Chargé d'affaires	Ali Khamenei	Zail Singh	June 1, 1989	1368
June 1, 1989	1368	Ebrahim Rahimpour	Persian: ابراهیم رحیم‌پور		Akbar Hashemi Rafsanjani	Ramaswamy Venkataraman	November 1, 1993	1372
November 1, 1993	1372	Ali-Reza Sheikh-Attar	Persian: علیرضا شیخ عطار		Akbar Hashemi Rafsanjani	Shankar Dayal Sharma	March 1, 1998	1376
April 1, 1998	1377	Mahmoud Mousavi	Persian: میرمحمود موسوی		Mohammad Khatami	Kocheril Raman Narayanan	December 1, 2002	1381
January 1, 2003	1381	Siavash Zargar	Persian: سیاوش زرگر یعقوبی		Mohammad Khatami	Avul Pakir Jainulabdeen Abdul Kalam	October 1, 2007	1386
2007	1386	Mehdi Nabizadeh	Persian: مهدی نبی‌زاده		Mahmoud Ahmadinejad	Pratibha Patil	November 1, 2012	1391
December 1, 2012	1391	Gholamreza Ansari	Persian: غلامرضا انصاری		Mahmoud Ahmadinejad	Pranab Mukherjee	March 1, 2018	1396
April 1, 2018	1397	Ali Chegeni	Persian: علی چگنی		Hassan Rouhani	Pranab Mukherjee	2022	1401
October 26, 2022	1401	Iraj Elahi	Persian: ایرج الهی		Ebrahim Raisi	Droupadi Murmu	October 8, 2025	1404
