= Alireza Sheikhattar =

Iranian diplomat (born 1952)

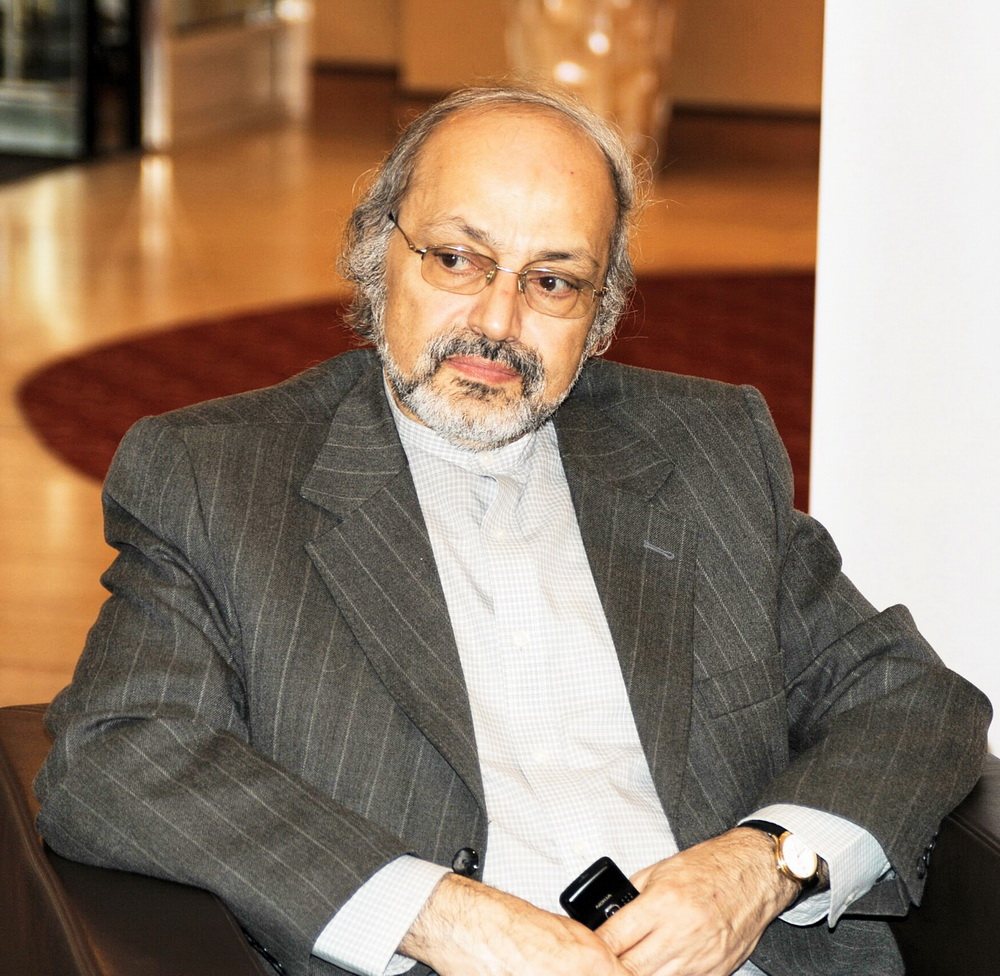

Alireza Sheikhattar (born 9 June 1952 in Tehran) is an Iranian diplomat and previous ambassador of the Islamic Republic of Iran to Berlin.

== Life ==
After receiving a BA in chemistry from the Sharif University of Technology, he earned a Master's in Management. Sheikhattar speaks Persian (mother tongue), English and Turkish.

The official website of the Iranian Embassy describes him as Director of the Poly Acrylic Company of Iran from 1977 to 1979. From 2003 to 2005, he was the daily newspaper's Managing Director and Chief Editor, Hamshahri.

Sheikh Attar is married and has three children.

== Political and diplomatic activities ==
Sheikhattar was a governor from 1980 to 1985 of the provinces of Kordestan and West Azerbaijan. Subsequently, he was Deputy Minister of Industry from 1985 to 1989. After that, he was in the office of adviser to the Minister of Foreign Affairs for the CIS countries from 1990 to 1992. From that year until 1998, he was the Ambassador of the Islamic Republic of Iran to Delhi. He was in the Office of the Secretary-General until 1999. Sheikhattar was then the 1999-2005 Advisor to the Supreme National Security Council and director of research for Asia at the Center for Strategic Studies. From 2005 to 2007, he served as a Deputy Foreign Minister for Economic Affairs and from 2007 to 2008, he served as a Deputy Foreign Minister and Vice Minister for the Middle East and CIS countries.

=== Ambassador to Berlin ===
Since October 2008, Sheikh Attar has worked after a long diplomatic tug-of-war as Ambassador of the National Republic of Iran in Berlin. He succeeded former Ambassador Mohammad Mehdi Akhoundzadeh Basti.

== Publications ==
- 1982: Kurdistan
- 1992: The roots of political behavior in the Caucasus and Central Asia
- 2002: Religion and Politics in India
- 2003: The Kurds and the Regional and National Powers

He is a prolific writer in Persian and English on Management, Central Asia, India, Iraq and Kurdistan.
