= Yousef Shariatzadeh =

- Born: 1930; Tabriz, Iran
- Died: 2001 (aged 70–71); Tehran, Iran
- Education: University of Tehran [Faculty of Fine Arts of Tehran University]
- Occupation: Architect
- Notable work: National Library of Iran; Shahid Bahonar University of Kerman
- Parents: Farangis Orangi (father); Mehdi Shariatzadeh (mother)

Yousef Shariatzadeh (Persian: یوسف شریعت‌زاده; 1930–2001) was an Iranian architect and one of the pioneers of contemporary architecture in Iran. He was born in 1930 in Tabriz. He began his studies in the field of architecture at the Faculty of Fine Arts of Tehran University and graduated from this university in 1963.

== Professional life ==
Shariatzadeh and Amir Nusrat Monanghah (Persian: امیر نصرت منقح) together founded the "Amir Nusrat Monanghah and Youssef Shariatzadeh Institute" in 1958, one of the technical teams of Iranian architecture was formed in a short period of time.

The result of the collaboration between these two architects (1954–1962) is the following:

- Gendarmerie Hospital (current police force) on Vali Asr Street.
- The central building of the Ministry of Labor and Social Security in Azadi Street, Tehran.
- A number of hospitals and health centers of the Social Insurance Organization in different parts of the country, including the 300-bed hospital in Isfahan.
- Also, a large number of residential units and private homes.

A new round of activities of this design and architecture team began under the title of "Bonyan Consulting Engineers Office" (Pirraz) together with Mohsen Mirhaider, In 1971. Among the activities of this group in the years 1971 to 1978, the following projects can be mentioned:

- Shahid Bahonar University of Kerman.
- A series of educational buildings of the University of Science and Technology.
- Food industry building in Neishabur, Golpayegan and Garmsar.
- Central Bank banknote printing building in Tehran.
- Building No. 2 of the Ministry of Oil in Tehran.
- Pars Wagon Industrial Complex in Arak.
- Tabriz industrial center experts apartment complex.
- Tandis residential complex in Africa highway (Tehran).
- Study and design of 15 rural development centers.
- Hangar of government planes at Mehrabad airport in Tehran.

The last work of Yousef Shariatzadeh is the design of the National Library of Iran in Tehran. He died in October 2001.

- National Library of Iran

In Shariatzadeh's architectural works, there is no imitation of other architectural styles, and the form and volumes of his designs have been formed following research and study and a detailed understanding of the needs of the space.

He said about himself: "I am not a form giver, I am a form finder".
