= Tomb of Hafez =

Memorial structure in Shiraz, Iran

Hafeziyeh (Tomb of Hafez)
- Hāfeziyeh
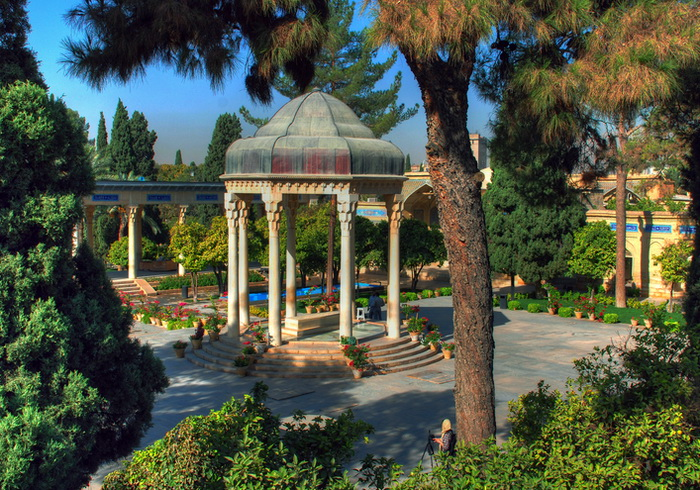
- Interactive map of Hafeziyeh (Tomb of Hafez)
- Location: Shiraz, Iran
- Coordinates: 29°37′31.45″N 52°33′29.95″E
- Designer: André Godard
- Completion date: 1452 (first building); 1935 (modern building)
- Dedicated to: Hafez

The Tomb of Hafez (Persian: آرامگاه حافظ), commonly known as Hāfezieh (حافظیه), are two memorial structures erected in the northern edge of Shiraz, Iran, in memory of the celebrated Persian poet Hafez. The open pavilion structures are situated in the Musalla Gardens on the north bank of a seasonal river and house the marble tomb of Hafez. The present buildings, built in 1935 and designed by the French architect and archaeologist André Godard, are at the site of previous structures, the best-known of which was built in 1773. The tomb, its gardens, and the surrounding memorials to other great figures are a focus of tourism in Shiraz.

== History ==
Hafez was born in Shiraz in 1315 and died there in 1390. A beloved figure of the Iranian people, who learn his verses by heart, Hafez was prominent in his home town and held a position as the court poet. In his memory, a small, dome-like structure was erected in Shiraz near his grave at Golgast-e Mosalla in 1452, by the order of Abul-Qasim Babur Mirza, a Timurid governor. The Golgast-e Mosalla were gardens (now known as Musalla Gardens) that featured in Hafez's poetry. With a surface of over 19,000 square metres, the gardens were also home to one of Shiraz's cemeteries, and Babur had a pool built here at the same time as the memorial. Believing they were ordered by omens in Hafez's poetry, Abbas the Great and Nader Shah both carried out separate restoration projects in the following 300 years.

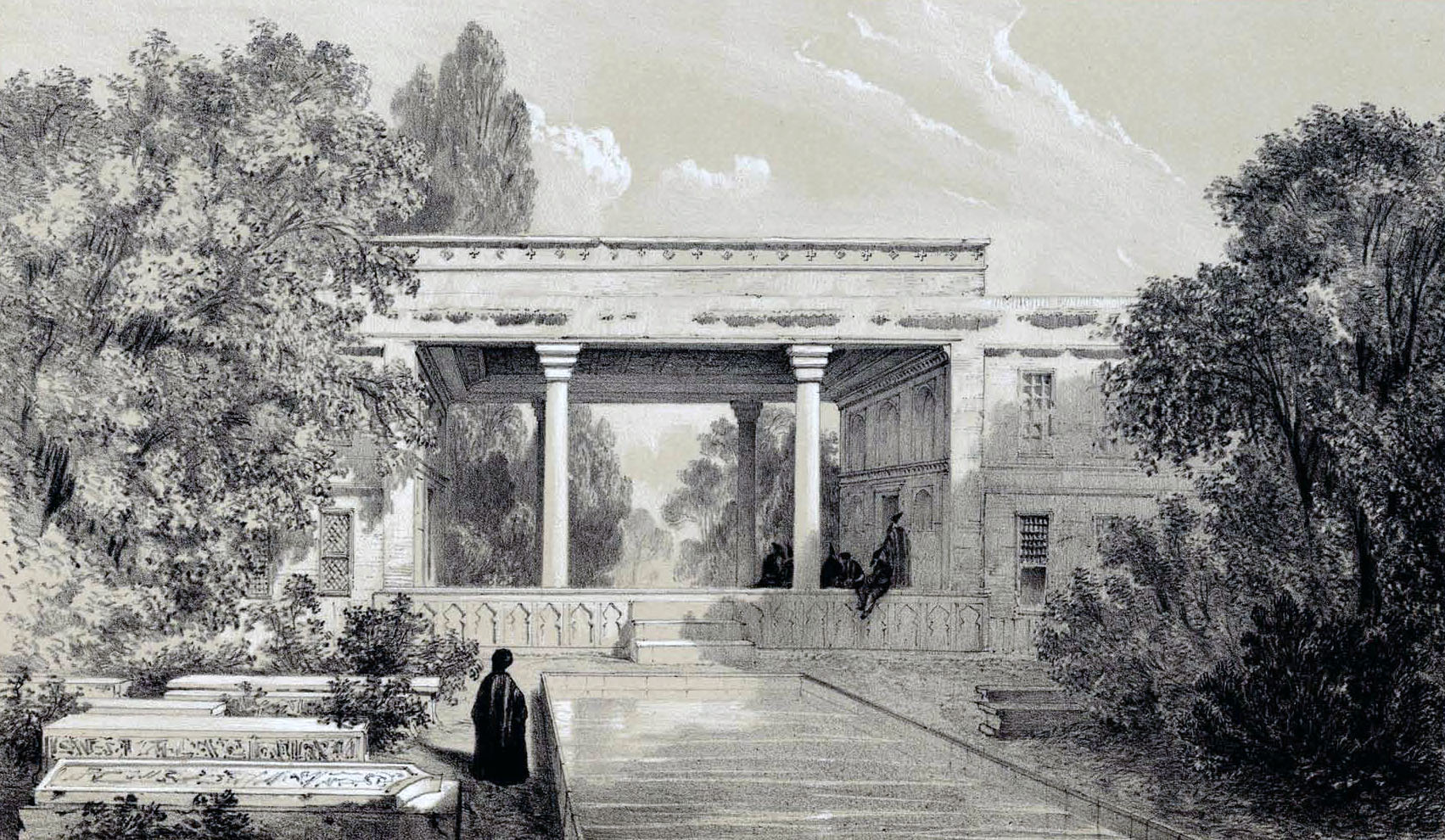
Drawing by Eugène Flandin, 1840s

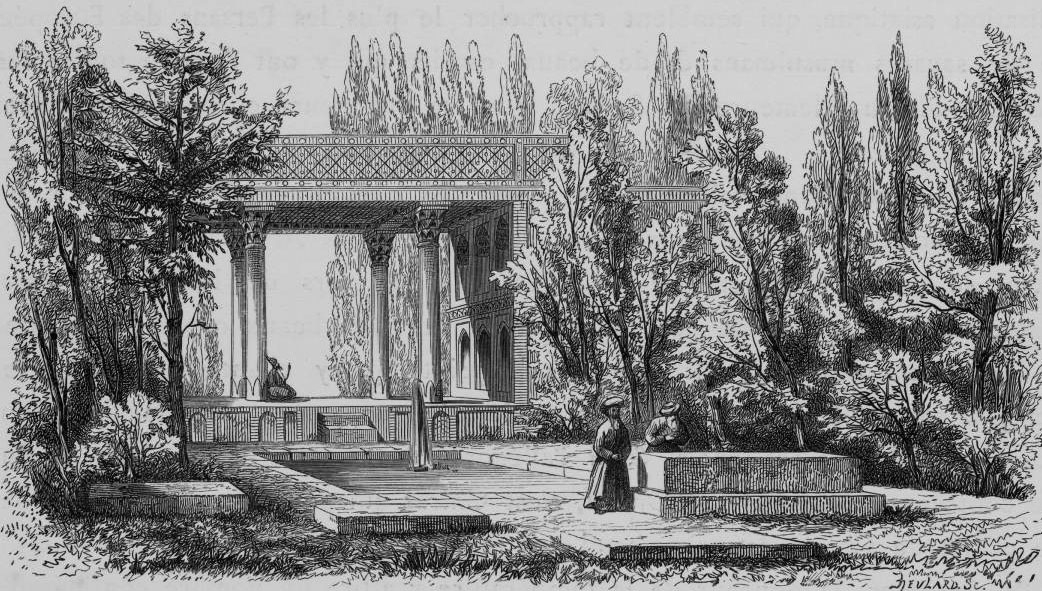
Drawing by Pascal Coste, 1840s

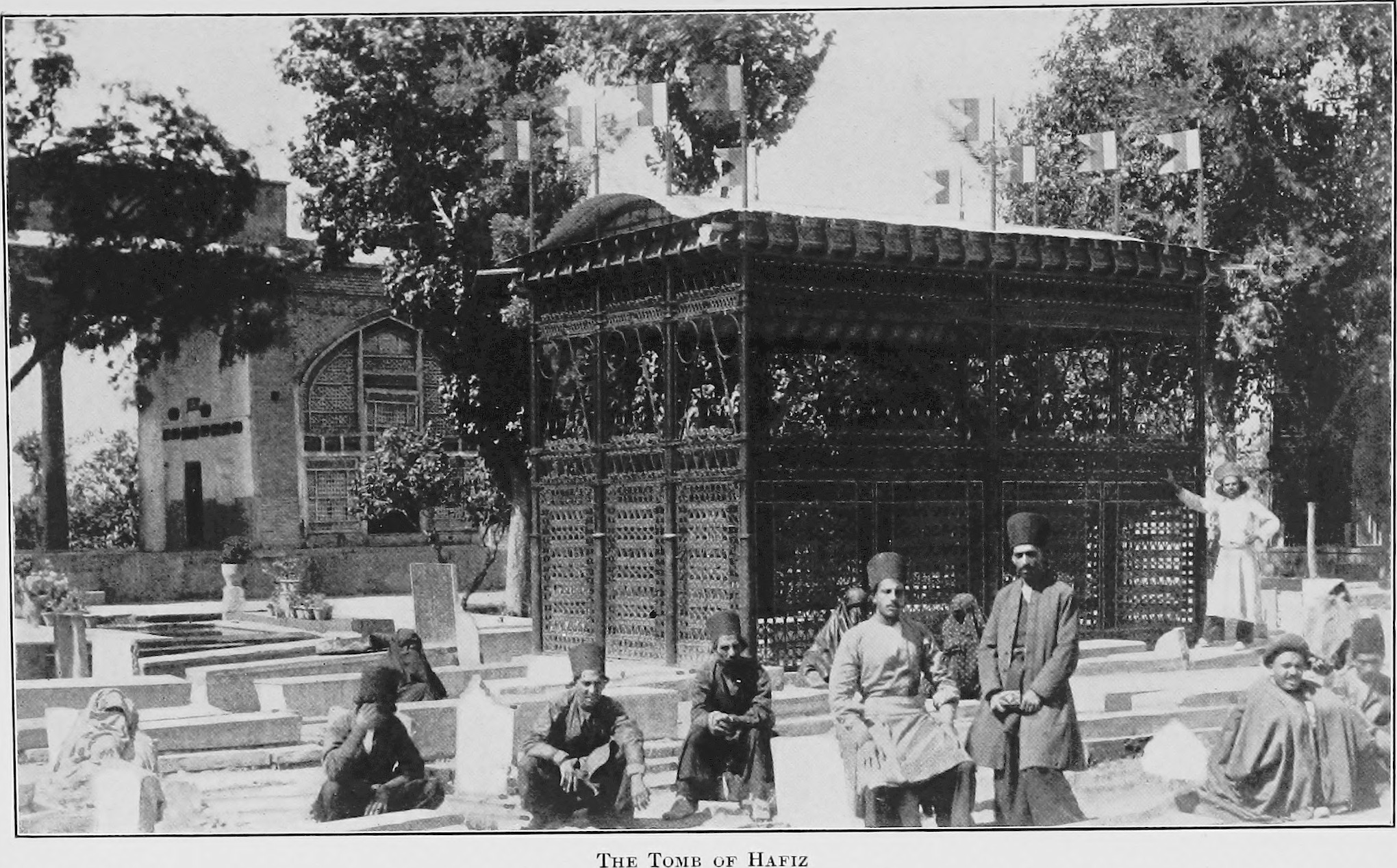
Photograph of Hafez's tomb, 1906

A much more substantial memorial was constructed in the gardens in 1773, during the reign of Karim Khan Zand. Situated on the north bank of the seasonal Rudkhaneye Khoshk river in the Musalla Gardens, the Hāfezieh consisted of four central columns, with two rooms built at the east and west end and with the north and south sides remaining open. The building split the gardens into two sections, with the orange grove in the front and the cemetery in the back. The actual tomb was outside of the structure, in the middle of the cemetery, with a marble slab placed over the grave. The marble was engraved by a calligrapher with excerpts from Hafez's poetry.

The tomb was restored in 1857, by a governor of Fars, and a wooden enclosure was built around the tomb in 1878, by another governor of Fars. Following this, the site became a subject of controversy, when, in 1899, Ardeshir, a Parsi from India began to build a shrine around Hafez's grave. Although the philanthropist Parsi had obtained permission from an ulema of Shiraz to build the iron and wood shrine, a doctor of religious law with some authority in Shiraz, ʿAli-Akbar Fāl-Asiri, objected to a Zoroastrian building over the grave of a Muslim. With his followers, he destroyed the half-built construction. The people of Shiraz protested the destruction and the government ordered the rebuilding of the monument, but Fāl-Asiri opposed them and pronounced that he would destroy any building raised there, even if it were erected by the shah himself.

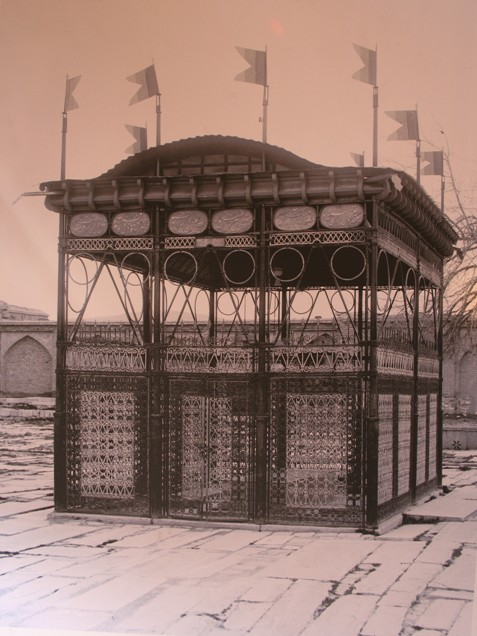
A photo of iron transenna, once in place around Hafez's tomb

The site remained in ruins for two years, until 1901 when Prince Malek Mansur Mirza Shoa as-Saltaneh placed a decorative iron transenna around Hafez's tomb. It was inscribed with verse and the names of the patrons of the transenna.

== Present structure ==
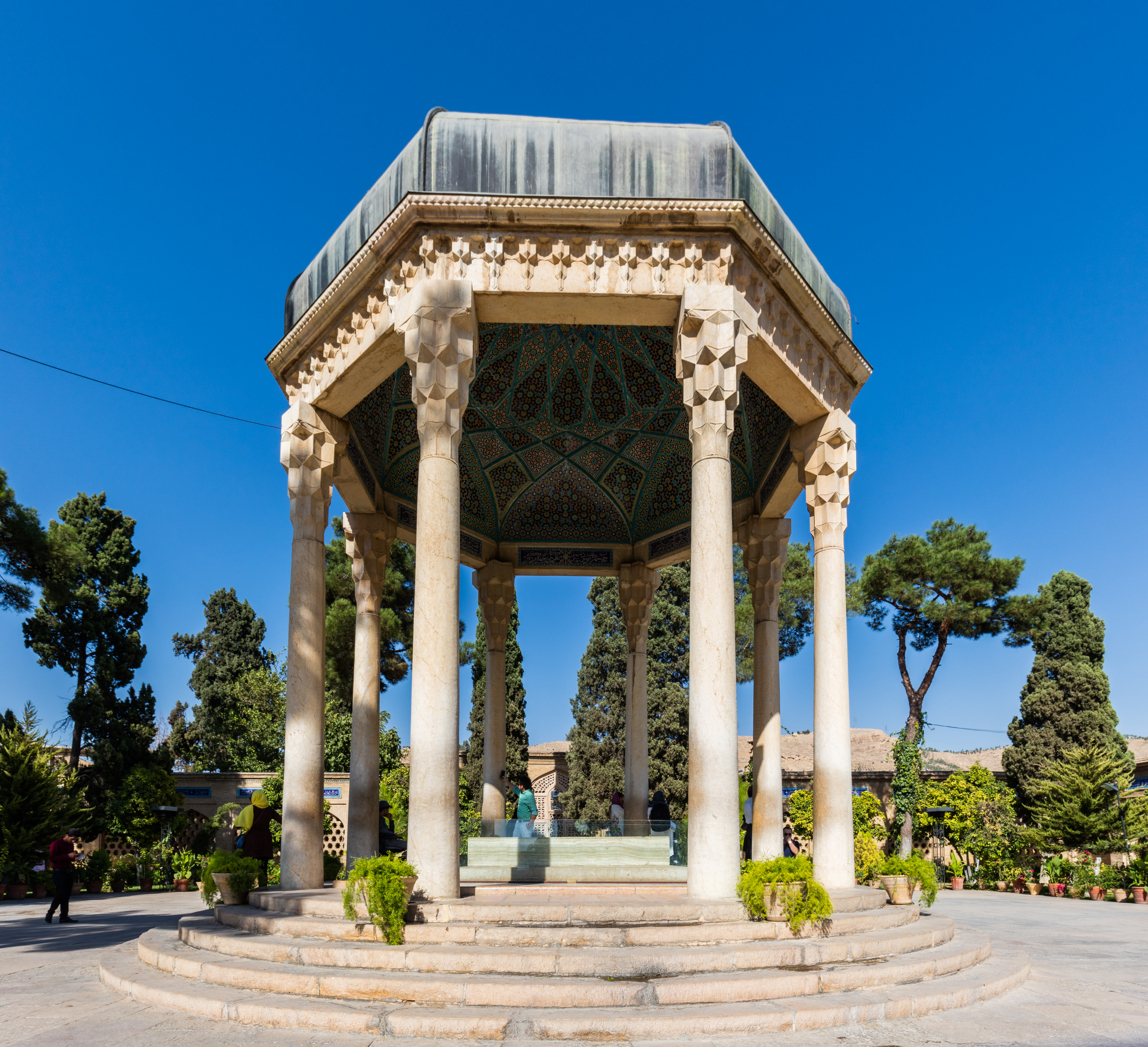
View of the tomb of Hafez

Plan of Hafez's Mausoleum

Activities to restore and expand the memorial to Hafez began in 1931, when the orange grove was repaired and the Hāfezieh was altered by a governor of Fars and Isfahan, Faraj-Allāh Bahrāmi Dabir-e Aʿẓam. Additional improvements were delayed until the Ministry of Education organised for a new building to be built, in 1935. André Godard, a French archaeologist and architect, was the technical director of the Department of Antiquities at the time, and was commissioned to design the new buildings.

The Tomb of Hafez (Hafeziyeh) in Shiraz, is located in an old cemetery within a building complex courtyard. Godard preserved the historical buildings around the tomb to highlight the area's transformation over time while introducing innovative elements. His design paid homage to traditional monumental tombs in gardens in Iran and Zand architecture of Shiraz. Scholars recognize this design as a significant typology: "Circular or round in plan, with a domed or tent roof, these tomb towers established a type which persisted for centuries". Godard incorporated the round plan and domed space of tomb towers, discussing them in his essay "Mile Ahangan" about a tomb tower in Mashhad, and in various other essays and lectures. Ali Sami Shirazi supervised the construction of the Tomb of Hafez, which began in 1938 and was completed in 1940.

Alterations to Hafez's tomb involved elevating it one metre above ground level and encircling it with five steps. Eight columns, each ten metres tall, support a copper dome in the shape of a dervish's hat. The underside of the dome is an arabesque and colourful mosaic. An octagonal structure was built around the tomb, featuring a dome adorned with Moaraq tiles, Hafez's poems, and Iranian geometric patterns. The dome used the traditional Iranian Karbandi technique, transitioning from a square base to a circular dome via an octagonal intermediary (Hasht Gush). Eight stone columns, crafted with the same intricate carvings as the Zand-era columns in the nearby talar, supported the dome. However, Houshang Seyhoun, Godard's protégé, criticized this replication of historical columns, arguing for designs that evoke but do not duplicate the past. The historical building north of the tomb was converted into a library, and stone fountains from Zand buildings in Shiraz were placed in the garden pools.

The Hafezieh tomb complex features a garden divided by a talar (open-columned hall) measuring 7 by 56 meters. The original, four-columned memorial hall built in 1773 by Karim Khan Zand was extensively expanded. Sixteen pillars were added to the four original, creating a long verandah, and on several façades are engraved ghazals and other excerpts from Hafez's poetry. This talar creates a transition from the bustling city to the tranquil tomb. The symmetrical axis of the entrance leads directly to the tomb, reflecting the symmetry of historical Iranian gardens.

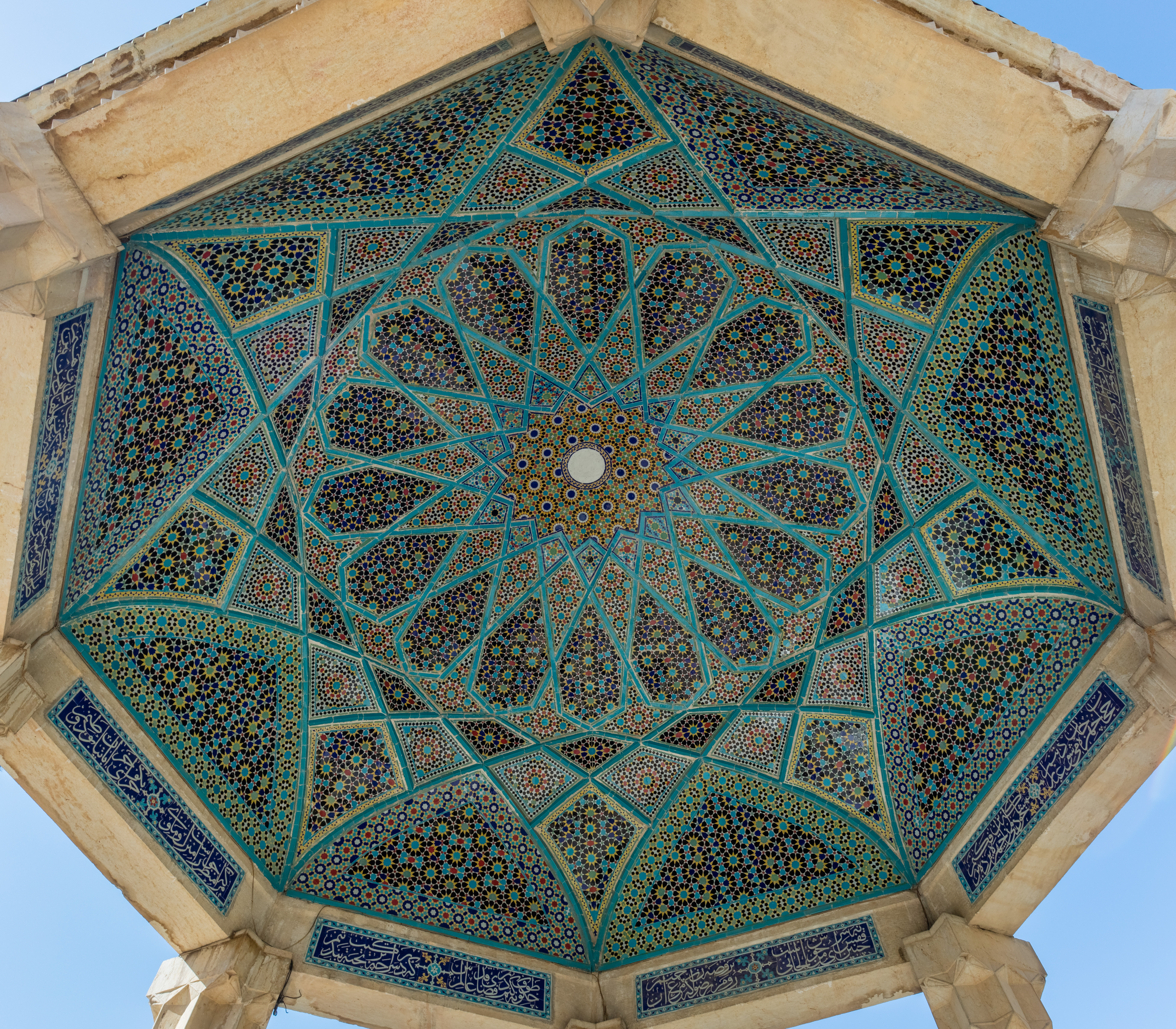
Ceiling of the pavilion

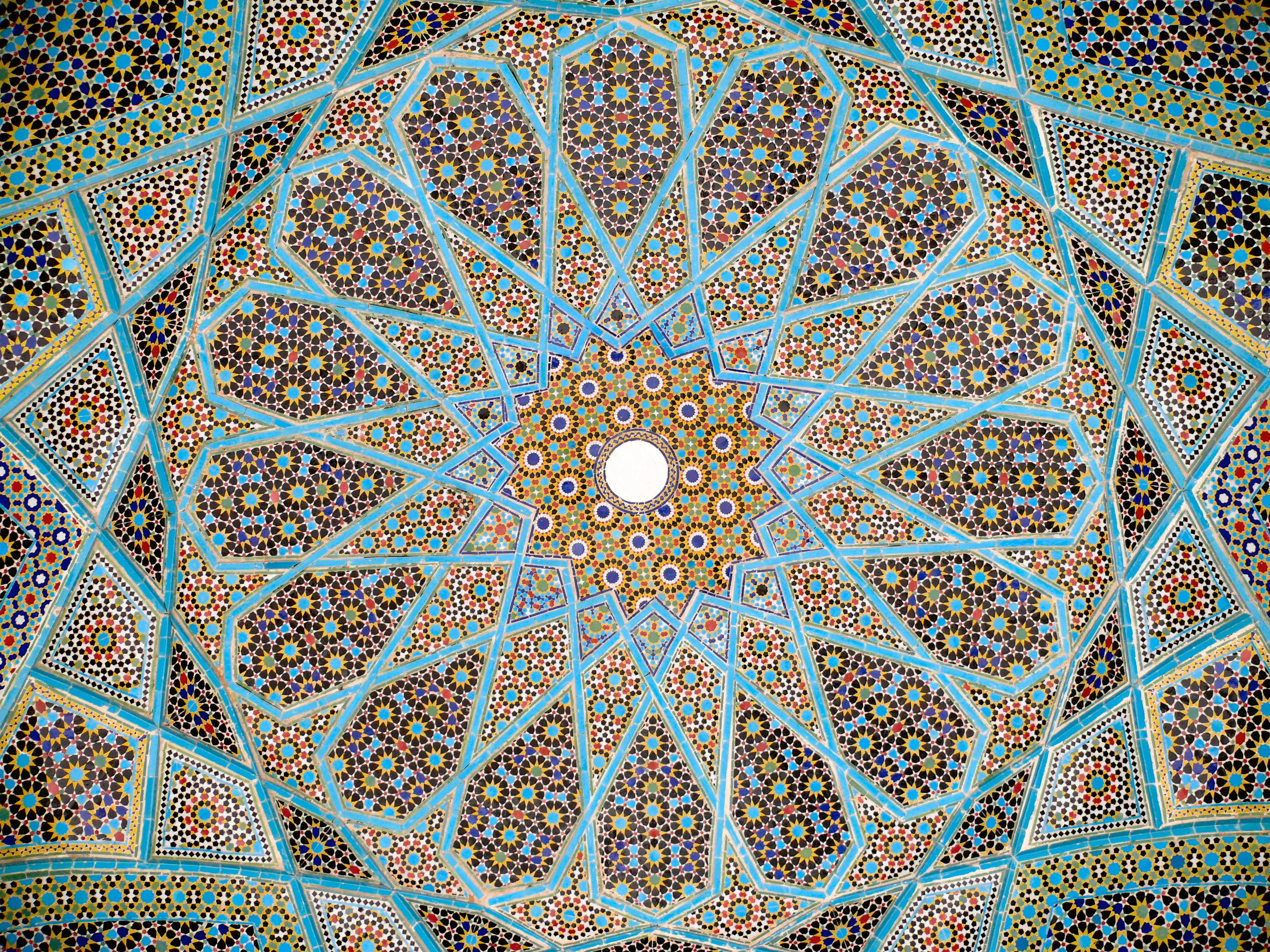
Enamelled tiles mosaic on the ceiling of the pavilion

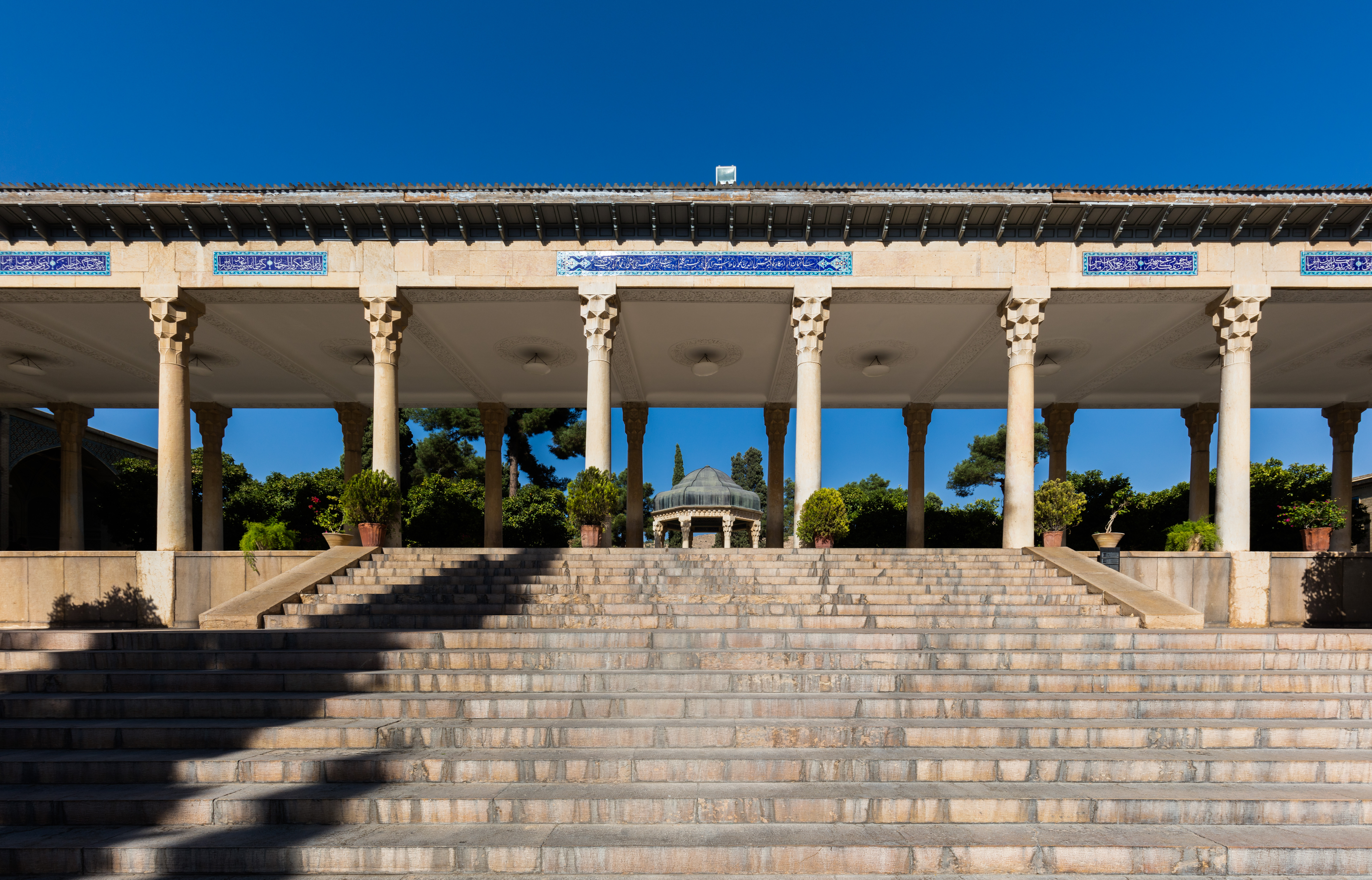
Entrance

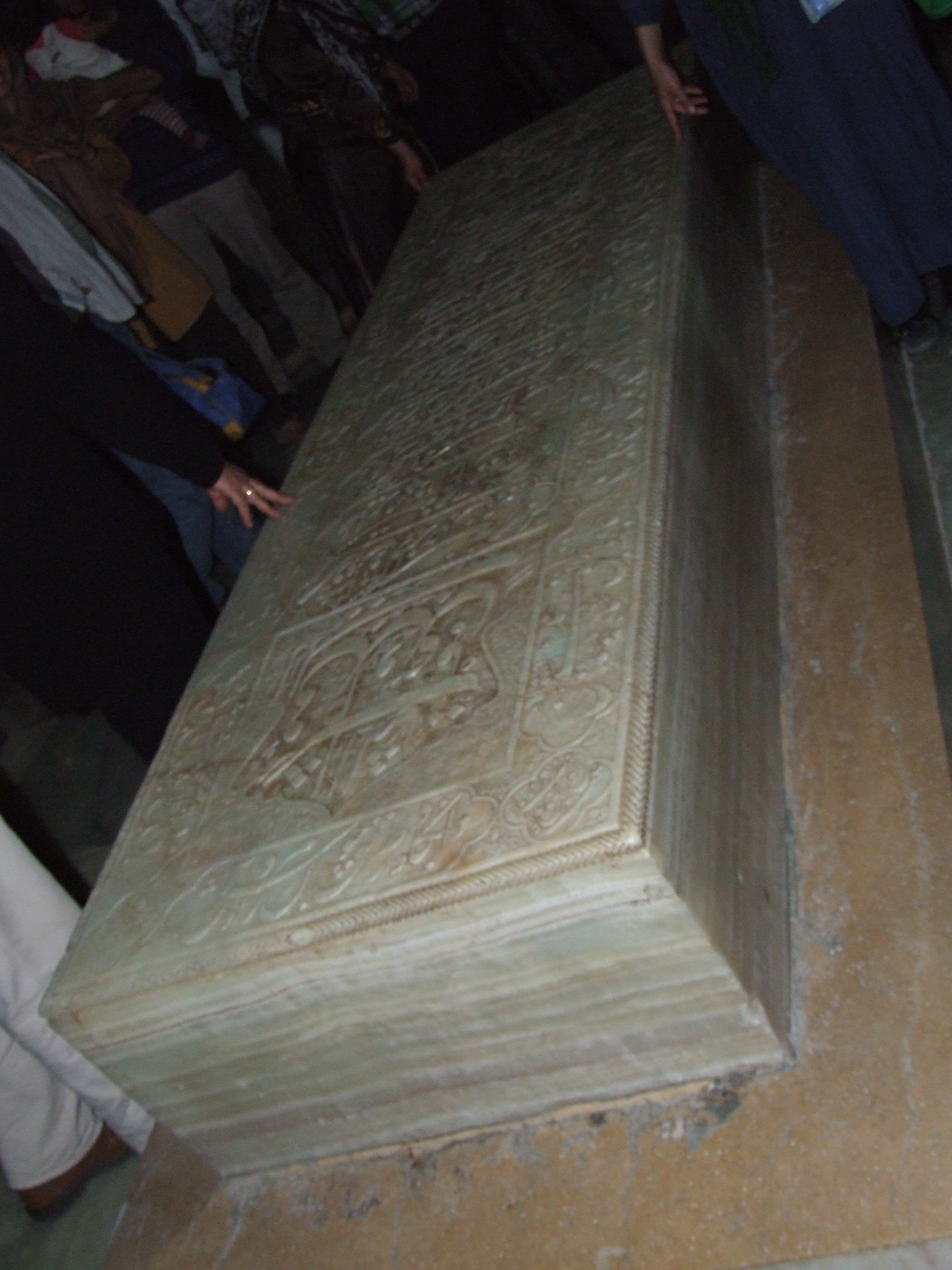
Tomb stone

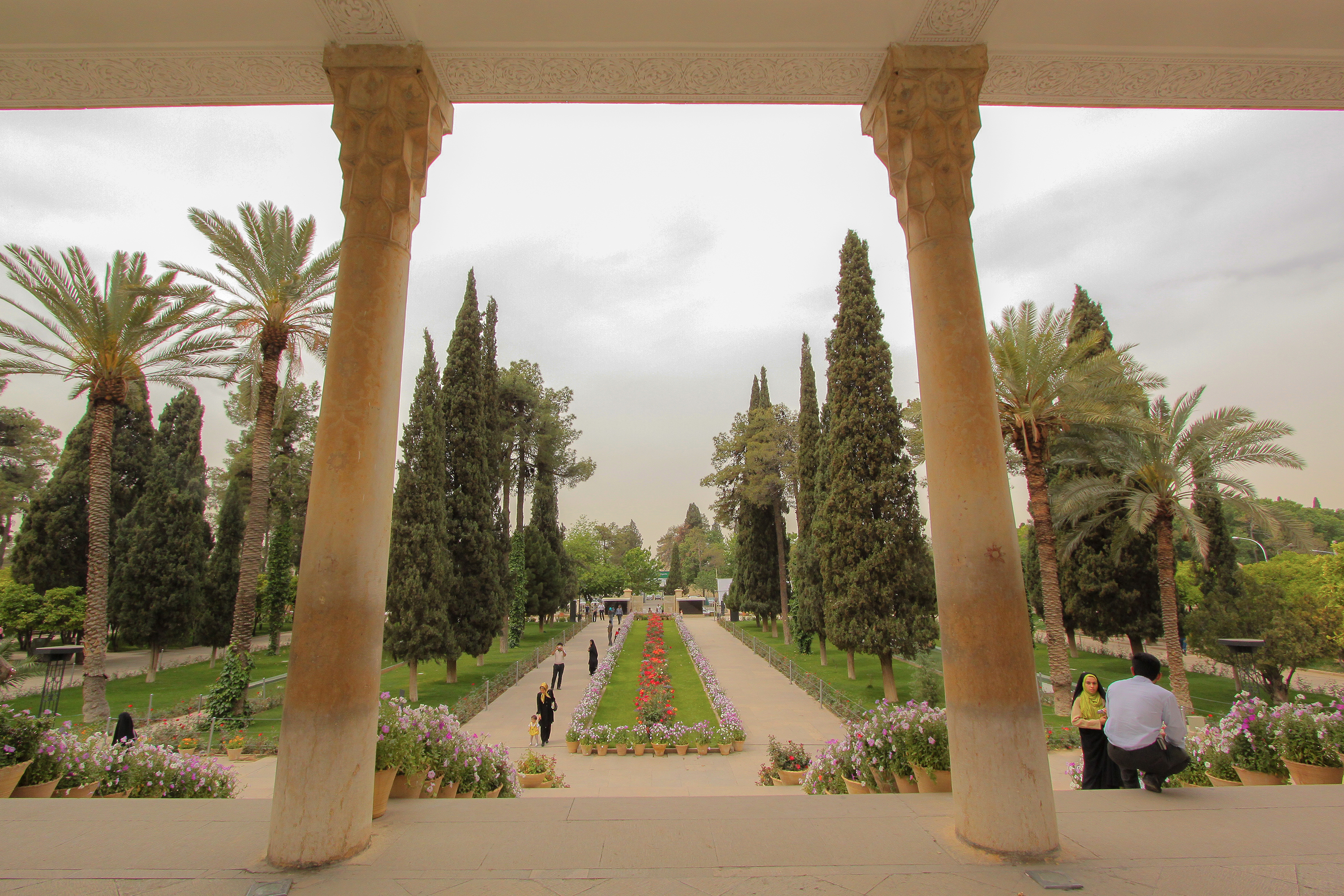
Two columns from Karimkhani's four columns

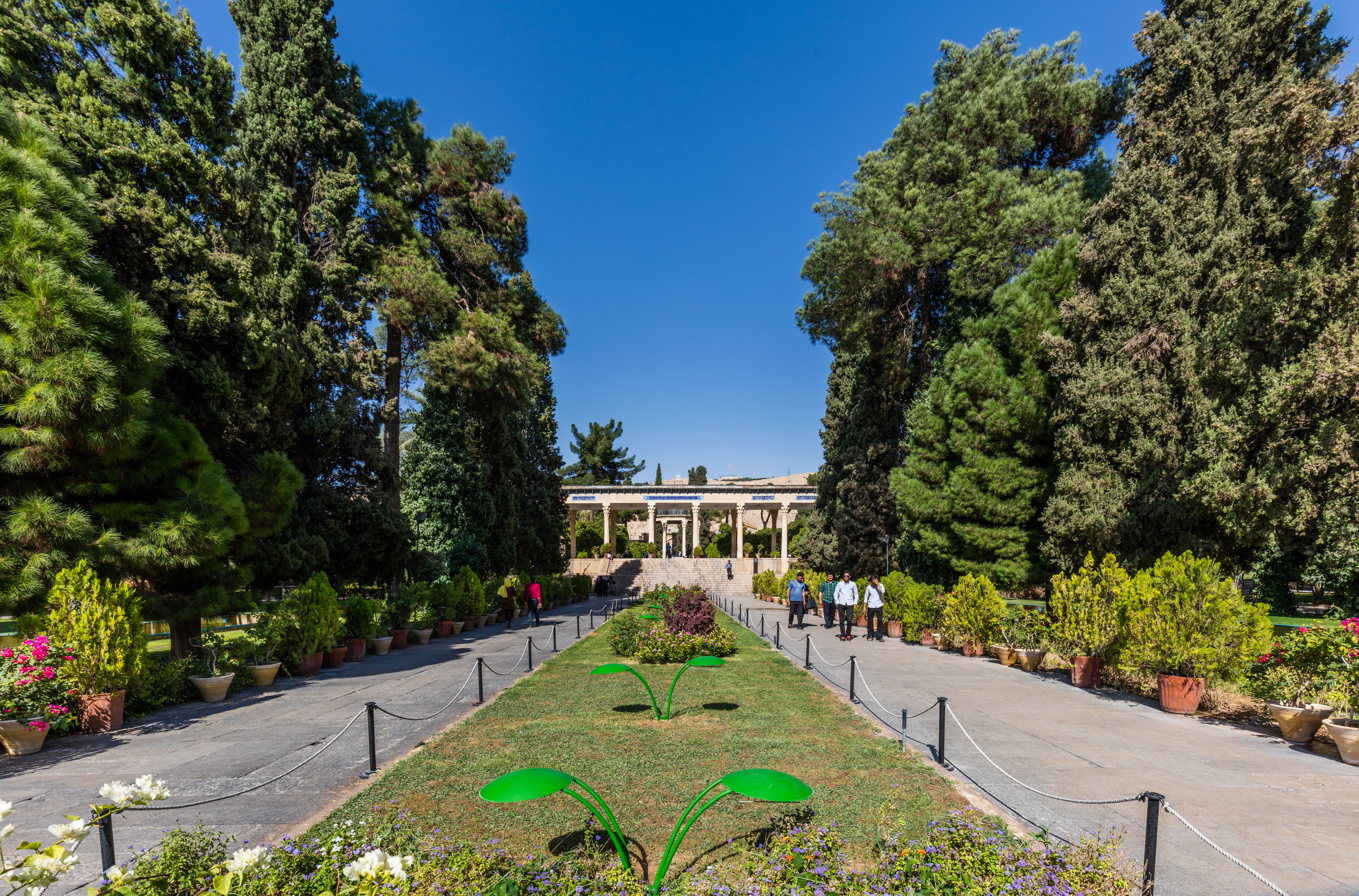
Garden

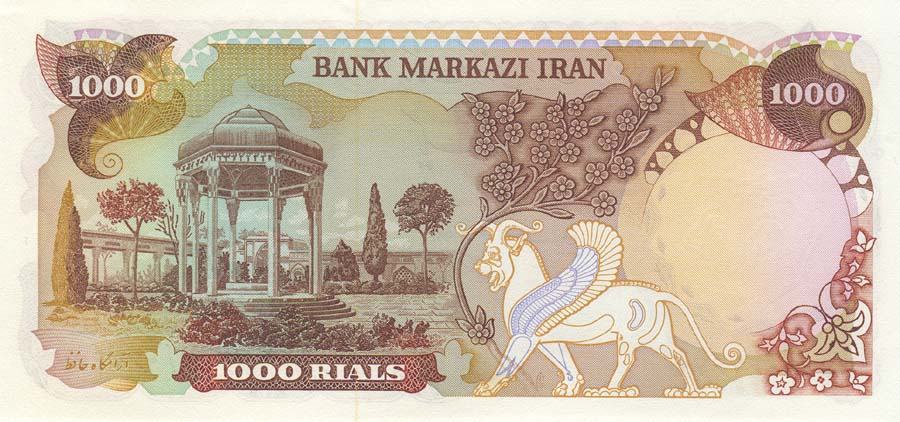
Tomb of Hafez on the reverse of a 1974 1000 Iranian rial banknote
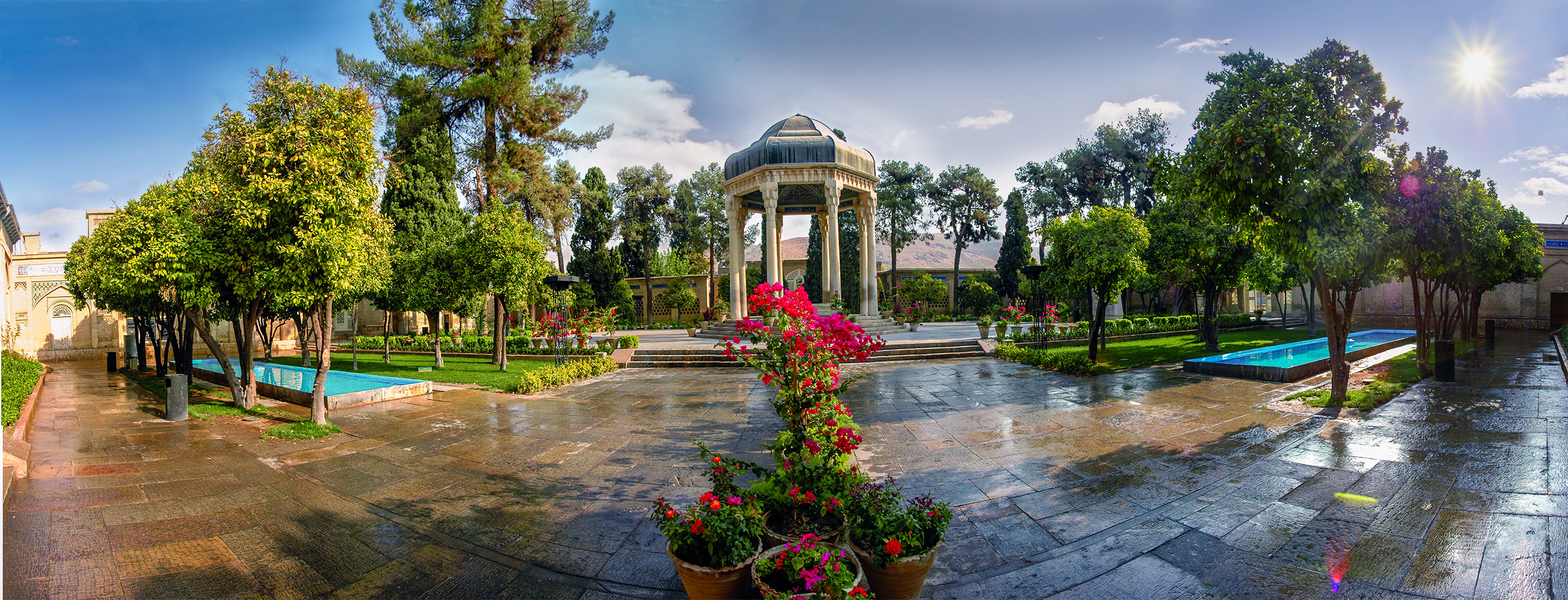
Panoramic image of Tomb of Hafez

== Architect of the Hafez tomb ==
Andre Godard was a famous orientalist and a graduate of the Faculty of Fine Arts in Paris. He was known in the world as a powerful person in the field of architecture. He was invited to Iran in 1307 AH and was entrusted with the construction and restoration of many historical sites in Iran. Andre Godard lived in Iran for about 32 years, during which time he tried to create many changes in the field of archeology and cultural heritage of Iran by preparing a list of changes and construction of historical monuments in Iran. He and his wife also introduced Iranian historical and cultural artifacts in a French-language publication. It can be boldly said that the construction and restoration of the tomb of Hafez was one of the most enduring activities of Andre Godard in Iran, which made his name forever recorded in the history of Iran.Ali Sami Shirazi, the project supervisor of the Hafez tomb, confirmed in his book that the tomb was designed by Godard.

== Gardens and tourism ==
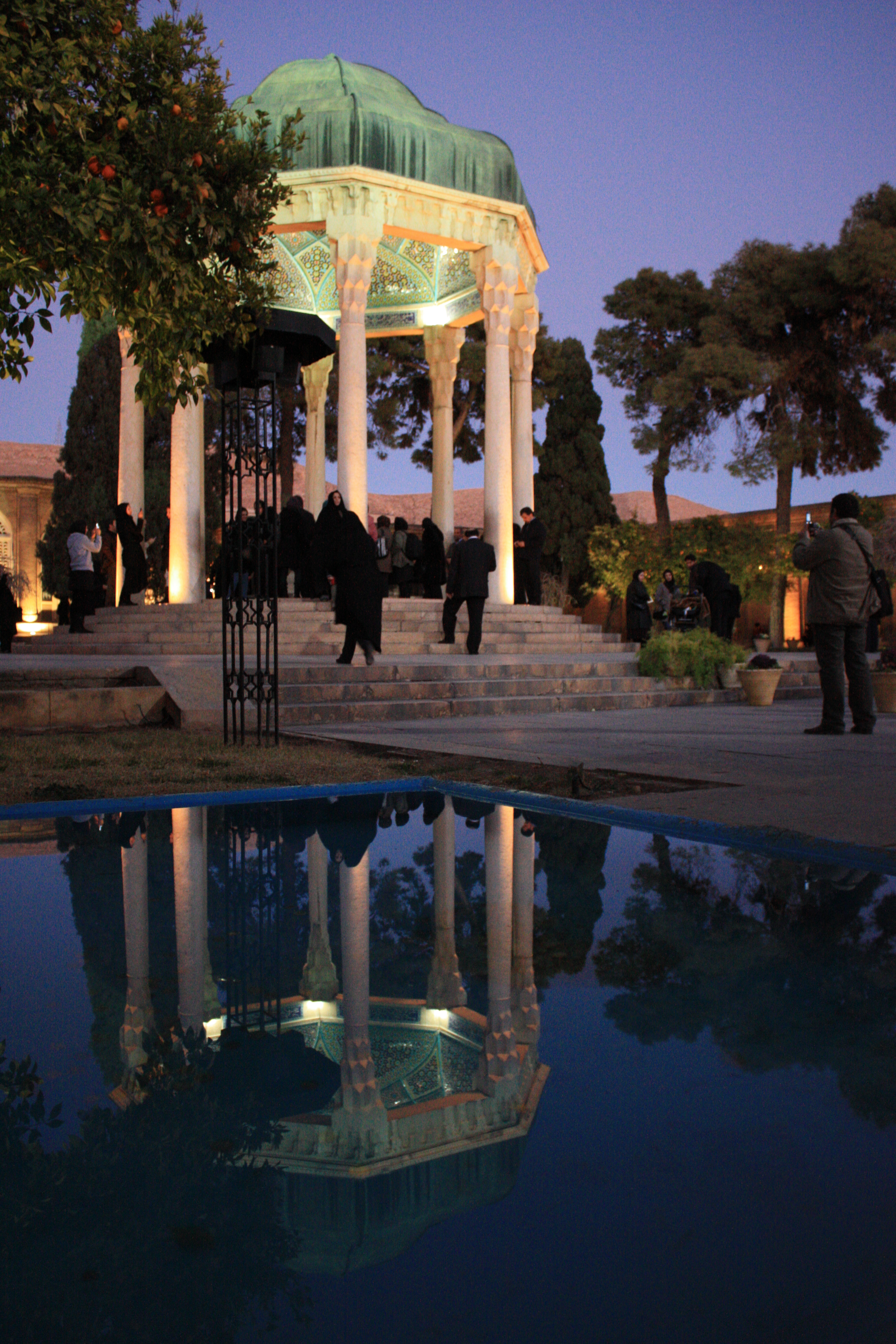
The tomb of Hafez, illuminated at night

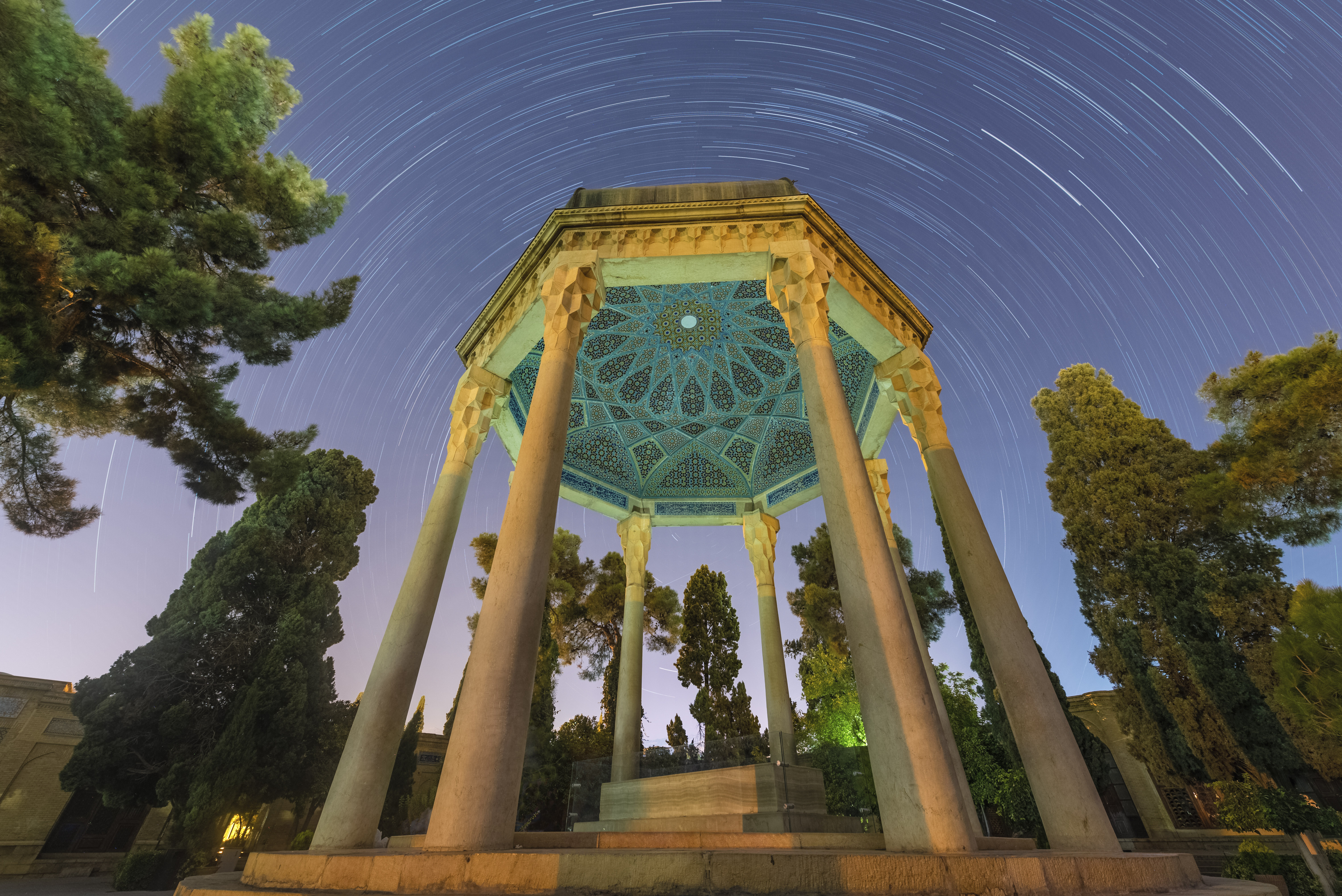
View of the tomb from the ground

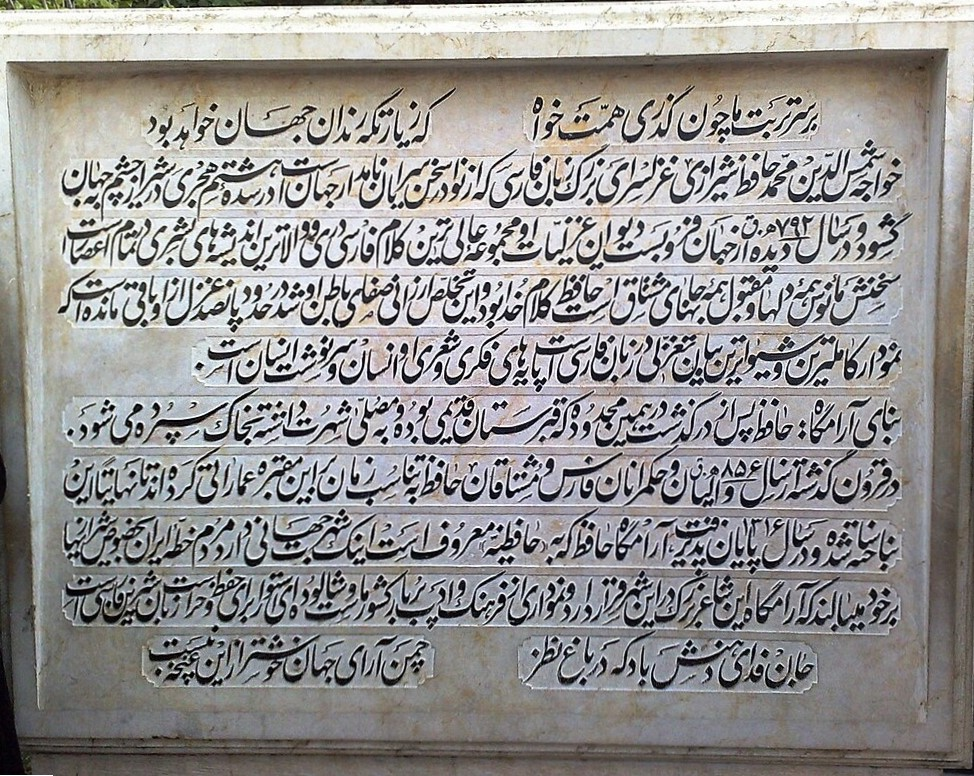
Inscription of the tomb construction report

Several rectangular pools have been added amongst the gardens, and well-maintained orange trees, paths, streams, and flower beds create a pleasant environment for the tourism hub of Hafez's tomb and memorial hall. A tea house on the grounds provides refreshments in a traditional setting. The dome over Hafez's grave is well lit at night, providing an attractive focal point. The former tomb of Qāsem Khan Wāli is now a library containing 10,000 volumes dedicated to Hafez scholarship.

== See also ==
- Persian domes
