= Ali Sami Shirazi =

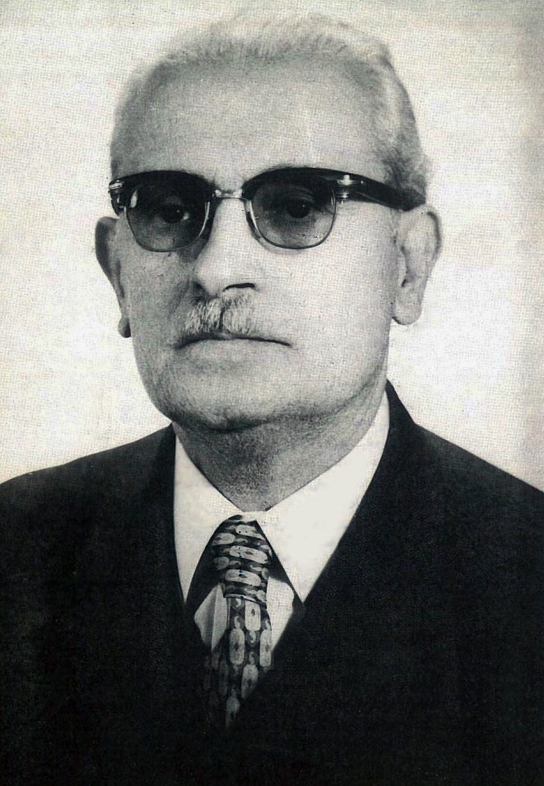

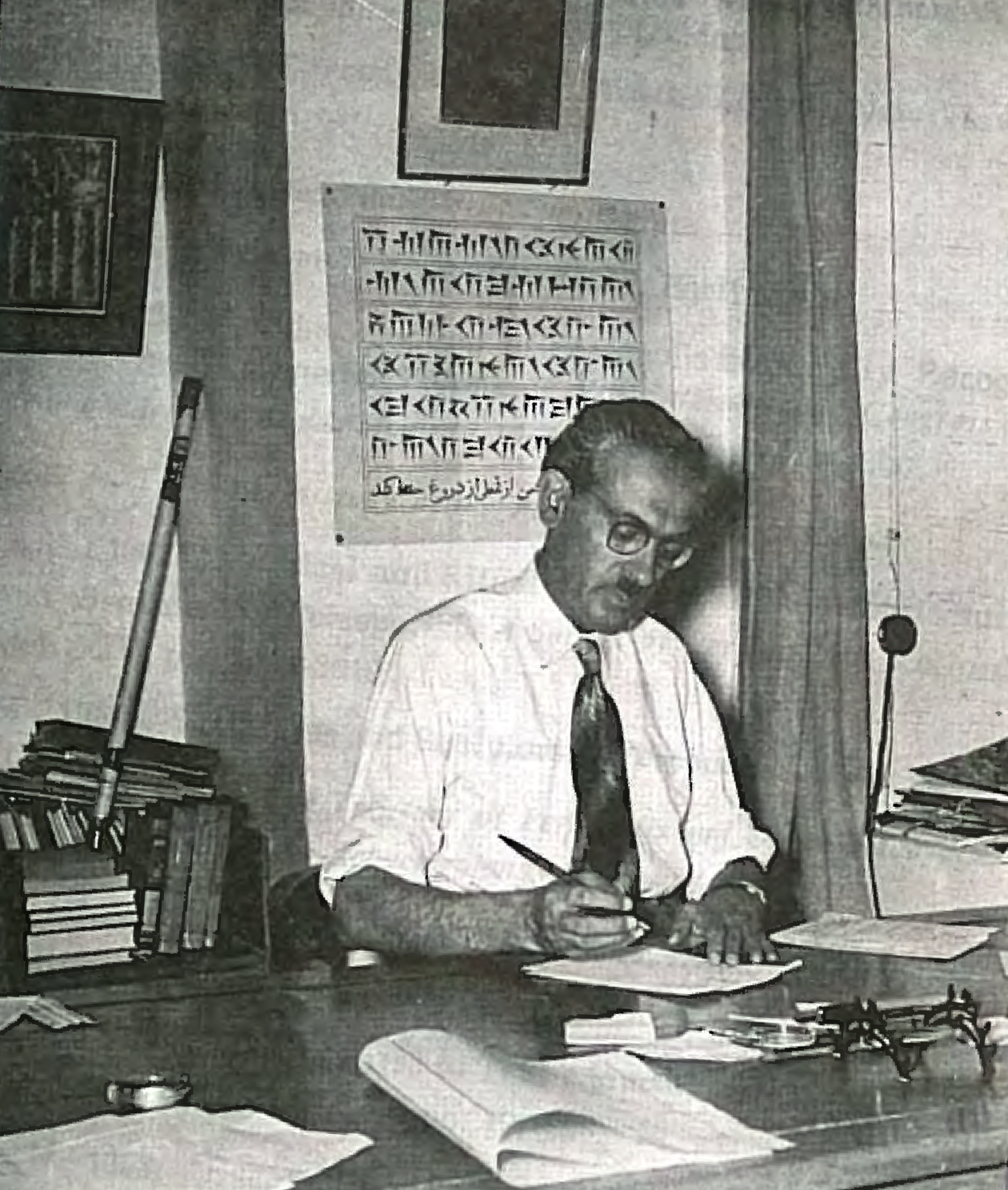

Ali Sami Shirazi (1910–1989) (Alī Sāmī) was an Iranian teacher, archaeologist, and author in Iran. He was director of the Scientific Bureau of Persepolis from 1941 until 1961. He led excavations at Persepolis for several seasons. He also conducted excavations at Pasagardae. He authored guidebooks on Shiraz and Persepolis.

Sami worked under André Godard and later with Mohammad Taqi Mustafavi, director generals of the Iranian General Office of Archaeology.

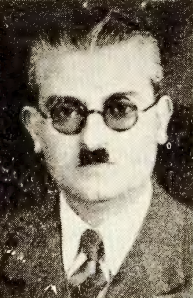

His book on Persepolis was translated by R. N. Sharp, an English reverend and "oriental" scholar who spent more tham 3 decades in Persia.

== Bibliography ==
- Persepolis (Takht-i-Jamshid)
- Pasargadae, the oldest imperial capital of Iran (1956)
- Shiraz : the city of the poets Saʻadi and Háfez, the city of flowers and nightingales (1958)
- Tamaddun-i Sāsānī (1963)
