= Maxime Siroux =

French architect

Maxime Siroux (25 October 1907 – 26 January 1975) was a French architect and archaeologist.

He worked with Andre Godard in Iran for many years. Ali Asghar Hekmat states that he commissioned Andre Godard to design the national library, Siroux's records indicate that he designed the building probably under the order of Godard and very similar to the museum's building.

Traveling in Iran, Siroux meticulously measured the ruins of caravanserais and other ancient structures, preserving their legacy for future generations. While working on the restoration of the caravanserai of Madare Shah in Esfahan, Siroux started writing Anciennes voies et monuments routiers de la région d'Ispahân, suivis de plusieurs autres édifices de cette province, but his most important bookwork is Caravansérails d'Iran et petites constructions routières. In 2023, when Iran sought UNESCO registration for Iranian caravanserais as world heritage sites, they relied extensively on Siroux's publications to substantiate their claim of the enduring originality and scholarly value of his works.

In designing and constructing the Academy of Boys in Tabriz, Hekmat documented in his memoirs the local materials Siroux employed to construct the building, including brick, stone, iron, and cement, an improvement on the mud brick used for older buildings. One of the most significant challenges at the time was the limited availability of modern materials in Iran. Siroux designed the Hakim Nezami School in Qom with stone and brick while retaining the forms and methods of Iranian historical architecture. Siroux designed another school in Yazd, the Iranshahr School, which resembled the old local caravanserais but contained new functions, such as a laboratory and auditorium. More than ten local master builders––including Ramezankhani, Ashkezari, Mehrizi, and others––built this school with an arching technique unique to Yazd, Yazdi Bandi. While Siroux designed the school with consideration for the Yazd's warm, dry weather, Godard measured and examined the site. Working consistently across the country, Siroux incorporated local architecture traditions and materials, as exemplified by the Shahpur School in Kazerun.

In 1934, when Siroux began the construction of Amjadieh Stadium, with an intended capacity of 15,000, Reza Shah approved the design and ordered similar stadiums be built across Iran.

Houshang Seyhoun became Godard and Siroux's student at the new College of Art and Architecture (Honarkadeh). Students could choose one of three architectural design studios for their education, and Seyhoun opted for Siroux's studio. Seyhoun later said, “Siroux loved Iran and he served Iran very well, that's why I chose to be in his studio.”

Siroux conducted one of the three architectural design studios and the construction techniques class in the newly established University of Tehran. His tenure spanned four years, until Godard decided to appoint Houshang Saanei, a recent graduate and Siroux's student, to replace him. Saanei, a former student in Siroux's Design Studio and later worked in his office, wrote that Siroux had changed his approach to learning architecture. Siroux's replacement was done at the request of the Dean of the University of Tehran, who stated in a letter that the university should replace Maxime Siroux if a qualified Iranian professor existed; only in the absence of such a candidate could Siroux be hired.

Maxime Siroux also played a crucial role in conserving historic buildings and sites in Iran including Meydan Naqshe Jahan in Esfahan, a UNESCO World Heritage site housing the Shah Mosque, Sheikh Lutfullah Mosque, and Ali Qapo Palace.

Iran's government initially hired Maxime Siroux to design new buildings, but he ended up becoming actively involved in the preservation of historical buildings. Notable projects include the restoration of the Yazd Mosque, Qom Mosque, and Niyasar Fire Temple. As the architect of the Ministry of Education, he personally designed plans for the restoration of the semi-ruined Safavid Fin Garden near Kashan, suggesting he had deep knowledge of Iran's historical architecture. As Karim Pirnia affirmed: "Maxime Siroux knew Iran better than any other foreign scholar. He traveled to many remote and fearful corners around Iran alone, and he had to sleep among wild animals to measure these buildings. Siroux worked really hard to understand Iranian architecture."

After World War II, the French government called on all French architects to return to France and contribute to the reconstruction and renovation of the nation. Siroux left Iran in 1945, but he returned in 1958 to undertake the preservation of the Caravanserai Madare Shah along with Iranian architects, artists, and builders including Ebrahimian, Chaychi, Rashtian, Meraatian, and many others. This Caravanserai was transformed into a modern hotel, the Hotel Abbasi, now considered one of the most unique hotels in Iran.
