= Ali-Asghar Hekmat =

Iranian politician (1892–1980)

- علی‌اصغر حکمت
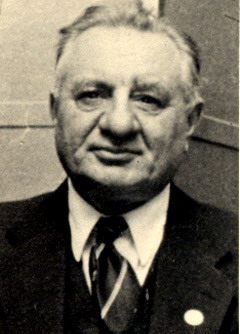
- Born: 16 June 1892; Shiraz, Sublime State of Iran
- Died: 25 August 1980 (aged 88); Tehran, Iran
- Political party: National Front

Ali-Asghar Hekmat-e Shirazi (Persian: علی‌اصغر حکمت شیرازی, romanized: ʿAlī-Aṣġar Ḥikmat-i Šērāzī; 16 June 1892 – 25 August 1980), or Mirza Ali-Asghar Khan-e Hekmat-e Shirazi (Persian: میرزا علی‌اصغر خان حکمت شیرازی, romanized: Mīrzā ʿAlī-Aṣġar Xān-i Ḥikmat-i Šērāzī), was an Iranian politician, diplomat and author who served as the Iranian minister of foreign affairs, minister of justice, and minister of culture during the reigns of Reza Shah and Mohammad Reza Shah. Hekmat was an Iranian ambassador to India and wrote multiple books about Indian history and culture. Following the 1979 Iranian Revolution, his books and works were ignored and he was labelled as a Freemason, but one of his books, Persian Inscriptions on Indian Monuments, was reprinted and introduced to Iranians.

Many of Iran's contemporary landmarks, such as the University of Tehran campus, Museum of Ancient Iran (later known as the Iran National Museum), and the tombs of Ferdowsi, Hafez, and Saadi, were constructed under his leadership.

== See also ==
- History of Iran

== Sources ==
- Aḥmad Eqtedāri, Kārvān-e ʿomr: ḵāṭerāt-e siāsi-farhangi-e haftād sāl ʿomr, Tehran, 1993, pp. 25–26, 205.
- Ḥasan-ʿAli Ḥekmat, "Moḵtaṣar-i dar šarḥ-e zendegi-e ostād ʿAli-Aṣḡar-e Ḥekmat", unpublished pamphlet, Tehran, 1981.
- Hormoz Ḥekmat, interviewed by Abbās Milāni, 23 April 2002.
- Bāqer Kāẓemi, in Iraj Afšār, ed., Nāma-hā-ye Tehrān, Tehran, 2000, pp. 416–427.
- Komision-e melli-e Yunesko (UNESCO) dar Īrān, Īrān-šahr, 2 vols., Tehran, 1963–64. Reżā Moʿini (ed.), Čehra-hā-ye āšenā, Tehran, 1965.
- United States Department of State, Foreign Relations of the United States, 1958–60, Washington, D.C., 1993.
- Mehdi Walāʾi, "Fehrest-e nosaḵ-e vaqfi-e ʿAli-Aṣḡar Ḥekmat be Āstān-e Qods-e Rażavi", Nosḵa-hā-ye ḵaṭṭi V, 1967, pp. 1–7.
