= List of compositions by Karol Szymanowski =

Below is a sortable list of compositions by Karol Szymanowski. The works are categorized by genre, Michałowski catalogue number, opus number, date of composition, titles and scoring.

| Genre | M | Opus | Date | Polish title (Original title) | English title | Scoring | Notes |
|---|---|---|---|---|---|---|---|
| Piano | M1 | 1 | 1899–1900 | Dziewięć preludiów: 1. Andante ma non troppo 2. Andante con moto 3. Andantino; 4. Andantino con moto 5. Allegro molto, impetuoso 6. Lento, mesto 7. Moderato; 8. Andante ma non troppo 9. Lento, mesto | 9 Preludes: 1. B minor 2. D minor 3. D♭ major 4. B♭ minor 5. D minor 6. A minor 7. C minor 8. E♭ minor 9. B♭ minor | for piano | |
| Vocal | M2 | 2 | 1900–1902 | Sześć pieśni: 1. Daleko został cały świat 2. Tyś nie umarła 3. We mgłach 4. Czasem, gdy długo, na pół sennie marzę 5. Słyszałem ciebie 6. Pielgrzym | 6 Songs | for voice and piano | words by Kazimierz Przerwa-Tetmajer |
| Piano | M5 | 3 | 1901–1903 | Wariacje fortepianowe b-moll | Variations in B♭ minor | for piano | theme and 12 variations; dedicated to Arthur Rubinstein |
| Piano | M3 | 4 | 1900–1902 | Cztery etiudy: 1. Allegro moderato 2. Allegro molto 3. Andante in modo d'una canzona 4. Allegro (ma non troppo) | 4 Études (4 Studies): 1. E♭ minor 2. G♭ major 3. B♭ minor 4. C major | for piano | |
| Vocal | M4 | 5 | 1902 | Trzy fragmenty z poematów Jana Kasprowicza: 1. Święty Boże; 2. Jestem i płaczę 3. Błogosławioną niech będzie ta chwila | 3 Fragments from Poems by Jan Kasprowicz: 1. Holy God; 2. Blessed Be That Moment; 3. I Am and Cry | for voice and piano | words by Jan Kasprowicz |
| Vocal | M6 | 6 | 1904, 1912 | Salome | Salome | for soprano and orchestra | lost; words by Jan Kasprowicz |
| Vocal | M7 | 7 | 1904 | Łabędź | The Swan | for voice and piano | words by Wacław Berent |
| Piano | M8 | 8 | 1903–1904 | Sonata fortepianowa nr. 1 c-moll | Sonata No. 1 in C minor | for piano | dedicated to Stanisław Ignacy Witkiewicz |
| Chamber music | M9 | 9 | 1904 | Sonata skrzypcowa d-moll | Sonata in D minor | for violin and piano | dedicated to Bronisław Gromadzki |
| Piano | M10 | 10 | 1900–1904 | Wariacje na polski temat ludowy h-moll | Variations on a Polish Folk Theme in B minor | for piano | dedicated to Zygmunt Noskowski |
| Vocal | M11 | 11 | 1904–1905 | Cztery pieśni: 1. Tak jestem smętny 2. W zaczarowanym lesie 3. Nademną leci w szafir morza 4. Rycz burzo... | 4 Songs | for voice and piano | words by Tadeusz Miciński |
| Orchestral | M12 | 12 | 1904–1905 | Uwertura koncertowa E-dur | Concert Overture in E major | for orchestra | |
| Vocal | M14 | 13 | 1905–1907 | Pięć pieśni: 1. Głos w mroku 2. Kołysanka Dzieciątka Jezus; 3. Na morzu 4. Zulejka; 5. Czarna lutnia | 5 Songs | for voice and piano | words by German poets in translation by Stanisław Barącz; 1. words by Richard Dehmel; 2. words by Clemens Brentano and Achim von Arnim; 3. words by Richard Dehmel; 4. words by Friedrich von Bodenstedt; 5. words by Otto Julius Bierbaum |
| Piano | M13 | 14 | 1905 | Fantazja C-dur | Fantasy in C major | for piano | |
| Piano | M19 | | 1905, 1909 | Preludium i fuga cis-moll | Prelude and Fugue in C♯ minor | for piano | |
| Orchestral | M15 | 15 | 1906–1907 | Symfonia nr. 1 f-moll | Symphony No. 1 in F minor | for orchestra | |
| Chamber music | | 16 | 1907 | Trio na fortepian, skrzypce i wiolonczelę | Piano Trio | for violin, cello and piano | withdrawn/destroyed by the composer |
| Vocal | M17 | 17 | 1907 | Dwanaście pieśni: 1. Wczesnym rankiem 2. Tajemnica; 3. Zaloty; 4. Nocą; 5. Refleksya; 6. Zwiastowanie; 7. Po burzy 8. Zawód; 9. Kołysanka; 10. Dusza; 11. Fragment ("Płomienny"); 12. Noc miłosńa | 12 Songs | for voice and piano | words by German poets in translation by Stanisław Barącz; 1.~8. words by Richard Dehmel; 9. words by Alfred Mombert; 10. words by Gustav Falke; 11. words by Alfred Mombert; 12. words by Martin Greif |
| Vocal | M18 | 18 | 1908, 1912 | Penthezilea | Penthesilea | for soprano and orchestra | words by Stanisław Wyspiański |
| Stage | | | 1908–1909 | Loteria na mężów, czyli Narzeczony nr. 69 | Lottery for Husbands or Fiancé No. 69 | | Operetta in 3 acts; libretto by Julian Krzewiński-Maszyński; premiered in 2007 |
| Orchestral | M24 | 19 | 1909–1910 | Symfonia nr. 2 B-dur | Symphony No. 2 in B♭ major | for orchestra | |
| Vocal | M20 | 20 | 1909 | Sześć pieśni: 1. Na księżycu czarnym 2. Święty Franciszek mówi 3. Pachną mi dziwnie twoje złote włosy 4. W mem sercu 5. Z maurytańskich śpiewnych sak 6. Na pustej trzcinie | 6 Songs | for voice and piano | words by Tadeusz Miciński |
| Piano | M25 | 21 | 1910–1911 | Sonata fortepianowa nr. 2 A-dur | Sonata No. 2 in A major | for piano | |
| Vocal | M22 | 22 | 1910 | Barwne pieśni (Bunte Lieder): 1. Pustelnik (Einsiedel); 2. Pieśń dziewczęcia u okna (Lied des Mädchens am Fenster); 3. Dla małych dziewczynek (An kleine Mädchen); 4. Nocy letniej srebrny cud (Das hat die Sommernacht getan); 5. Przeznaczenie (Bestimmung) | Colourful Songs | for voice and piano | words by German poets in translation by Stanisław Barącz; 1. words by Karl Bulcke; 2. words by Alfons Paquet; 3. words by Emil Faktor; 4. words by Anna Ritter; 5. words by Ricarda Huch |
| Chamber music | M23 | 23 | 1910 | Romans D-dur | Romance in D major | for violin and piano | dedicated to violinist Paweł Kochański |
| Vocal | M26 | 24 | 1911 | Pieśni miłosne Hafiza: 1. Życzenie; 2. Jedyne lekarstwo 3. Płonące tulipany 4. Taniec; 5. Zakochany wiatr 6. Smutna wiosna | Love Songs of Hafiz, 6 Songs: 1. Desires; 2. The Only Medicine; 3. Flaming Tulips; 4. Dance; 5. The Infatuated East Wind; 6. Sad Spring | for voice and piano | words by Hafez in translation by Hans Bethge nos. 1, 4 and 5 orchestrated and incorporated into Op. 26 |
| Stage | | 25 | 1912–1913 | Hagith | Hagith | | Opera in 1 act; libretto by Felix Dörmann |
| Vocal | M28 | 26 | 1911, 1914 | Pieśni miłosne Hafiza: 1. Grób Hafiza; 2. Serca mego perły 3. Głos twój 4. Wieczna młodość 5. Pieśń pijacka 6. Życzenie; 7. Zakochany wiatr 8. Taniec | Love Songs of Hafiz, 8 Songs | for voice and orchestra | words by Hafez in translation by Hans Bethge; 2. also for voice and piano 6.~8. orchestrations from Op. 24 |
| Choral | M36 | 27 | 1914–1916 | Symfonia nr. 3 "Pieśń o nocy" | Symphony No. 3 "Song of the Night" | for tenor (or soprano), mixed chorus and orchestra | words by Jalāl ad-Dīn Muḥammad Rūmī in translation by Tadeusz Miciński |
| Chamber music | M30 | 28 | 1915 | Nokturn i tarantela | Nocturne and Tarantella | for violin and piano | dedicated to Monsieur Auguste Iwański |
| Piano | M31 | 29 | 1915 | Metopy, Trzy poematy: 1. Wyspa syren 2. Kalipso; 3. Nauzykaa | Métopes, 3 Poèms: 1. L'île des Sirènes (The Island of Sirens); 2. Calypso; 3. Nausicaa | for piano | |
| Chamber music | M29 | 30 | 1915 | Mity: 1. Źródło Aretuzy; 2. Narcyz; 3. Driady i Pan | Mythes (Myths): 1. La Fontaine d'Aréthuse (The Fountain of Arethusa); 2. Narcisse (Narcissus); 3. Dryades et Pan (Dryads and Pan) | for violin and piano | |
| Vocal | M32 | 31 | 1915 | Pieśni księżniczki: 1. Samotny księżyc 2. Słowik; 3. Złote trzewiczki 4. Taniec; 5. Pieśń o fali 6. Uczta | Songs of a Fairy-Tale Princess | for voice and piano (or orchestra) | words by Zofia Szymanowska; nos. 1, 2 and 4 orchestrated in 1933 |
| Vocal | M33 | 32 | 1915 | Trzy pieśni do słów Dymitra Dawidowa: 1. Wschód słońca (Kaк тoлькo вocтoк); 2. Bezgwiezdne niebo (Heбo бeз звëзд); 3. Jesienne słońce (Oceнee coлнцe) | 3 Songs on Words by Dmitri Davydov | for voice and piano | words by Dmitri Pavlovich Davydov – Дмитрий Павлович Давыдов (1811–1888) in translation by Jarosław Iwaszkiewicz |
| Piano | M34 | 33 | 1916 | Dwanaście etiud: 1. Presto; 2. Andantino soave 3. Vivace assai (agitato); 4. Presto. Delicatamente; 5. Andante espressivo 6. Vivace (Agitato e marcato. Vigoroso); 7. Allegro molto (Con brio. Burlesco); 8. Lento assai mesto (espressivo); 9. Animato (Capriccioso e fantastico); 10. Presto (molto agitato). Tempestoso; 11. Andante soave (rubato); 12. Presto (Energico) | 12 Études (12 Studies) | for piano | |
| Piano | M35 | 34 | 1915–1916 | Maski: 1. Szecherezada; 2. Błazen Tantris; 3. Serenada Don Juana | Masques (Masks), 3 Pieces: 1. Shéhérazade (Scheherazade); 2. Tantris le bouffon (Tantris the Fool); 3. Sérénade de Don Juan (The Serenade of Don Juan) | for piano | |
| Concertante | M37 | 35 | 1916 | Koncert skrzypcowy nr. 1 | Concerto No. 1 | for violin and orchestra | in 1 movement; dedicated to violinist Paweł Kochański |
| Piano | M38 | 36 | 1917 | Sonata fortepianowa nr. 3 | Sonata No. 3 | for piano | |
| Chamber music | M41 | 37 | 1917 | Kwartet smyczkowy nr. 1 C-dur | String Quartet No. 1 in C major | for 2 violins, viola and cello | |
| Choral | M39 | 37b | 1917 | Demeter | Demeter, Cantata | for alto, female chorus and orchestra | words by Zofia Szymanowska |
| Choral | | 38 | 1917 | Agawe | Agave, Cantata | for soprano, mixed chorus and orchestra | unfinished, words by Zofia Szymanowska after The Bacchae by Euripides |
| | | 39 | | | | | |
| Chamber music | M42 | 40 | 1918 | Trzy kaprysy Paganiniego | 3 Caprices de Paganini (3 Paganini Caprices) | for violin and piano | transcription of Caprices Nos. 20, 21 and 24 by Niccolò Paganini; dedicated to Paweł Kochański and Józef Ozimiński |
| Vocal | | 41 | 1918 | Cztery pieśni do słów Rabindranatha Tagore: 1. Moje serca 2. Młody królewicz I 3. Młody królewicz II; 4. Ostatnia pieśń | 4 Songs to Lyrics by Rabindranath Tagore: 1. My Heart; 2. The Young Prince (I); 3. The Young Prince (II); 4. The Last Song | for voice and piano | words from The Gardener by Rabindranath Tagore in translation by Jarosław Iwaszkiewicz |
| Vocal | M44 | 42 | 1918 | Pieśni muezina szalonego: 1. Allah, Allah, Akbar...; 2. O, ukochana ma...; 3. Ledwie blask słońca...; 4. W południe miasto białe od gorąca...; 5. O tej godzinie, w której miasto śpi...; 6. Odeszłaś na pustynię zachodnią... | Songs of the Infatuated Muezzin: 1. Allah, Allah, Akbar...; 2. Oh, my beloved...; 3. Barely the sun glistens on the tower's roof...; 4. At noon the city is white from the heat...; 5. At the hour when the city sleeps...; 6. You departed into the western desert... | for soprano and piano or orchestra | orchestrated in 1934 |
| Stage | M45 | 43 | 1920 | Mandragora | Mandragora | for orchestra | Pantomime in 3 scenes; scenario by Ryszard Bolesławski and Leon Schiller |
| Orchestral | | | 1920 | Marsz 3. Pułku Ułanów | March of the Third Regiment of Uhlans | for wind orchestra | lost |
| Orchestral | | | 1920 | Marsz uroczysty | Ceremonial March | for orchestra | |
| Vocal | | 44 | 1920 | Dwie pieśni baskijskie: 1. Piękny księżyc 2. Ukochana złote włosy | 2 Basque Songs | for voice and piano | lost |
| Vocal | M48; M49; M50 | | 1920 | Trzy piosenki (Piosenki żołnierskie): 1. Do dziewczyny, Mazurek; 2. O zwiedzionym żołnierzu 3. Wyszywała raz Hanka... | 3 Songs (3 Soldier's Songs): 1. To the Sweetheart, Mazurka; 2. About a Deceived Soldier; 3. Hanka Was Once Embroidering... | for voice and piano | 1.~2. words by Kornel Makuszyński; 3. words by Kazimierz Andrzej Czyżowski |
| Vocal | | | 1920 | Wiedzie nas Haller | Haller Is Leading Us | for voice and piano | |
| | | 45 | | | | | |
| Stage | M55 | 46 | 1918–1924 | Król Roger | King Roger | | Opera in 3 acts; libretto by Jarosław Iwaszkiewicz in collaboration with the composer |
| Vocal | M51 | 46b | 1921 | Słopiewnie: 1. Słowisień; 2. Zielone słowa 3. Święty Franciszek; 4. Kalinowe dwory 5. Wanda | Słopiewnie, 5 Songs | for voice and piano or chamber orchestra | words by Julian Tuwim; orchestrated in 1923–1924 |
| Chamber music | | | 1921–1922 | Berceuse | Berceuse | for violin and piano | co-composed with violinist Paweł Kochański |
| Chamber music | | | 1921–1922 | Dance sauvage | Dance sauvage | for violin and piano | co-composed with violinist Paweł Kochański |
| | | 47 | | | | | |
| Vocal | M52 | 48 | 1922 | Trzy kołysanki: 1. Pochyl się cicho nad kołyską 2. Śpiewam morzu 3. Biały krąg księżyca | 3 Lullabies | for voice and piano | words by Jarosław Iwaszkiewicz |
| Vocal | M53 | 49 | 1922–1923 | Rymy dziecięce: 1. Przed zasnieciem 2. Jak się najlepiej opędzać od szerszenia?; 3. Mieszkanie; 4. Prosię; 5. Gwaizdka; 6. Ślub królewny 7. Trzmiel i żuk 8. Święta Krystyna; 9. Wiosna; 10. Kolysanka Lalek; 11. Gil i sroka 12. Smutek; 13. Wizyta u krowy 14. Kołysanka Krysi; 15. Kot; 16. Kołysanka Lalki; 17. Myszy; 18. Zły Lejba; 19. Kołysanka gniadego konia 20. Nikczemny szpak | Children's Rhymes, 20 Children's Songs: 1. Before Falling Asleep; 2. How Best to Get Rid of a Hornet; 3. Home; 4. Piglet; 5. Little Star; 6. Princess's Wedding; 7. Bumblebee and Beetle; 8. Saint Christina; 9. Spring; 10. Duckling's Lullaby; 11. Bullfinch and Magpie; 12. Sadness; 13. A Visit to Mrs. Crow; 14. Tina's Lullaby; 15. Wise Cat; 16. Duckling's Lullaby; 17. Mice; 18. Crafty Leiba; 19. Bay Horse's Lullaby; 20. Villainous Starling | for voice and piano | words by Kazimiera Iłłakowiczówna |
| Piano | M56 | 50 | 1924–1925 | Dwadzieścia mazurków: 1. Sostenuto; 2. Allegramente; 3. Moderato; 4. Allegramente, risoluto 5. Moderato; 6. Vivace; 7. Poco vivace 8. Moderato (non troppo); 9. Tempo moderato 10. Allegramente. Vivace. Con brio 11. Allegretto; 12. Allegro moderato 13. Moderato; 14. Animato; 15. Allegretto dolce 16. Allegramente. Vigoroso; 17. Moderato; 18. Vivace. Agitato; 19. Poco vivace 20. Allegramente – Con brio | 20 Mazurkas | for piano | |
| Stage | | 51 | 1925 | Kniaź Patiomkin | Prince Potemkin | for orchestra | Incidental music to act 5 of the 1906 play by Tadeusz Miciński |
| Chamber music | M58 | 52 | 1925 | Kołysanka | Lullaby (La berceuse d'Aitacho Enia) | for violin and piano | |
| Choral | M60 | 53 | 1925–1926 | Stabat Mater | Stabat Mater | for soprano, alto, baritone, mixed chorus and orchestra | Oratorio |
| Vocal | M63 | 54 | 1926 | Siedem pieśni do słów Jamesa Joyce'a: 1. Droga moja 2. Zaśnij; 3. Złocisty włos 4. Turkawko moja 5. Struny ziemi 6. Po deszczu 7. Majowe wiatry | 7 Songs on Words by James Joyce: 1. Gentle Lady, Do Not Sing; 2. Sleep Now; 3. Lean Out of the Window; 4. My Dove, My Beautiful One; 5. Strings in the Earth; 6. Winds of May; 7. Rain Has Fallen | for voice and piano | words by James Joyce in translation by Jarosław Iwaszkiewicz; nos. 5–7 left incomplete, completed by Adam Neuer |
| Stage | M68 | 55 | 1923–1931 | Harnasie | Harnasie | for tenor, mixed chorus and orchestra | Ballet-Pantomime in 2 acts, 3 scenes with prologue and epilogue; scenario by Jerzy Mieczysław Rytard in collaboration with the composer |
| Vocal | | | 1924 | Idom se siuhaje dołu, śpiewajęcy... (Pieśń siuhajów) | Siuhaje Are Coming Down Singing... (Song of Siuhaje) | for voice and piano | Highlander Song from Harnasie, Op. 55 |
| Chamber music | | | 1925 | L'aube | L'aube | for violin and piano | co-composed with violinist Paweł Kochański |
| Piano | M59a | | 1925 | Walc romantyczny | Romantic Waltz (Valse romantique) | for piano | |
| Vocal | | | 1925–1926 | Dziewięć pieśni polskich: 1. Idzie żołnierz borem, lasem 2. Tam na błoniu błyszczy kwiecie 3. Jak to na wojence ładnie 4. Leci liście z drzewa 5. Hej, strzelcy, wraz 6. Ułani, ułani, malowane dzieci 7. O mój rozmarynie 8. I zabujały siwe łabędzie 9. Gdzież to jedziesz, Jasiu | 9 Polish Songs | for voice and piano | |
| Piano | M60 | | 1926 | Cztery tańce polskie: 1. Mazurek; 2. Krakowiak; 3. Oberek; 4. Polonez | 4 Polish Dances: 1. Mazurka; 2. Krakowiak; 3. Oberek; 4. Polonaise | for piano | |
| Chamber music | M64 | 56 | 1927 | Kwartet smyczkowy nr. 2 | String Quartet No. 2 | for 2 violins, viola and cello | |
| Vocal | M65 | | 1928 | Vocalise-Étude | Vocalise-Étude | for voice and piano | |
| Choral | | | 1928–1929 | Sześć pieśni kurpiowskich: 1. Hej, wółki moje 2. A chtóz tam puka 3. Niech Jezus Chrystus; 4. Bzicem kunia 5. Wyrzundzaj się, dziwce moje 6. Panie muzykancie, prosim zagrać walca | 6 Songs from Kurpie | for mixed chorus a cappella | |
| Choral | M67 | 57 | 1930 | Veni Creator | Veni Creator | for soprano, mixed chorus, organ and orchestra | words by Stanisław Wyspiański |
| Vocal | M69 | 58 | 1930–1932 | Pieśni kurpiowskie: 1. Lecioły zurazie 2. Wysła burzycka 3. Uwoz, mamo 4. U jeziorecka 5. A pod borem 6. Bzicem kunia 7. Sciani dumbek 8. Leć, głosie, po rosie 9. Zarżyjzę kuniu 10. Ciamna nocka 11. Wysły rybki 12. Wsycy przyjechali | 12 Songs from Kurpie | for voice and piano | No. 9 Zarzyjze kuniu also for violin and piano (1931) |
| Choral | M72 | 59 | 1930–1933 | Litania do Marii Panny: 1. Dwunastodźwięczna cytaro...; 2. Jak krzew skarlały | Litany to the Virgin Mary, 2 Fragments: 1. Twelve-toned cithara...; 2. Like a Dwarf Bush | for soprano, female chorus and orchestra | words by Jerzy Liebert |
| Chamber music | | | 1931 | Pieśń Roksany | Roxana's Song (Chant de Roxane) | for violin and piano | transcription by the composer and Paweł Kochański from act 2 of King Roger, Op. 46; adapted for viola and piano by Lionel Tertis and published in 1953 |
| Chamber music | | | 1931 | Taniec z "Harnasiów" | Dance from "Harnasie" | for violin and piano | transcription by the composer and Paweł Kochański from Harnasie, Op. 55 |
| Chamber music | | | 1931 | Zarżyjzę kuniu | Zarżyjzę kuniu | for violin and piano | transcription by the composer and Paweł Kochański of No. 9 from 12 Songs from Kurpie, Op. 58 |
| Concertante | M70 | 60 | 1932 | Symfonia nr. 4 (Symphonie concertante) | Symphony No. 4 (Symphonie Concertante) | for piano and orchestra | dedicated to Arthur Rubinstein |
| Concertante | M71 | 61 | 1932–1933 | Koncert skrzypcowy nr. 2 | Concerto No. 2 | for violin and orchestra | A la memoire du Grand Musicien, mon cher et inoubliable Ami, Paweł Kochański |
| Piano | M73 | 62 | 1933–1934 | Dwa mazurki: 1. Allegretto grazioso 2. Moderato | 2 Mazurkas | for piano | |
