= Litany to the Virgin Mary (Szymanowski) =

Choral composition

- by Karol Szymanowski
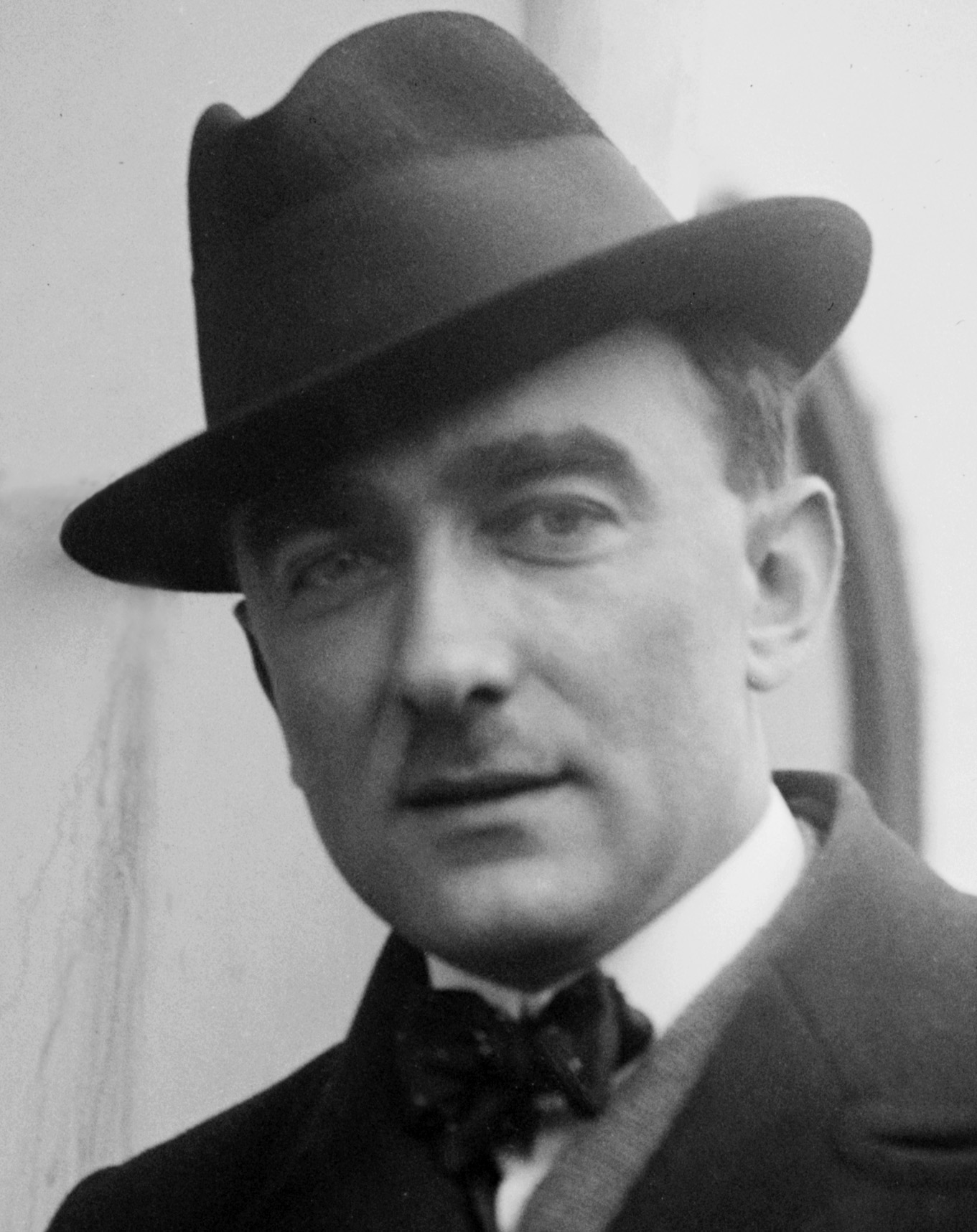
- The composer
- Opus: 59
- Text: by Jerzy Liebert
- Language: Polish
- Composed: 1930–1933
- Dedication: Anna Iwaszkiewiczowa
- Performed: 13 October 1933
- Published: 1951
- Movements: two
- Vocal: soprano soloist; SA women's choir
- Instrumental: orchestra

The Litany to the Virgin Mary (Polish: ''Litania do Marii Panny), Op. 59, is a sacred choral composition by Karol Szymanowski, written from 1930 to 1933 and scored for soprano soloist, a women's choir, and orchestra. The work is divided into two movements on a Polish text of the Litany to the Virgin Mary by Jerzy Liebert. Dedicated to Anna Iwaszkiewiczowa, it was first performed in 1933, conducted by Grzegorz Fitelberg. The work was first published in 1951.

== History ==
Szymanowski's had composed his Stabat Mater in the 1920s, his first sacred composition with a Polish text, and dedicated to a Marian hymn, the Stabat Mater. In 1930, Anna Iwaszkiewiczowa pointed him at Polish poem in seven stanzas by Jerzy Liebert, titled "Litania do Najświętszej Marii Panny" (Litany to the Blessed Virgin Mary). Szymanowski began to set the text as a song cycle or cantata. After drafts from 1930, he interrupted the work, but was possibly prompted by the author's death in 1931 to resume it. He set only two of the seven stanzas, the third and the sixth.

The Litany was premiered on 13 October 1933, conducted by Grzegorz Fitelberg. The work was published in 1951 as part of the edition of the composer's complete works.

== Movements ==
There are two movements:

1. Dwunastodźwięczna cytaro (Twelve-toned cithara)
2. Jak krzew skarlały (Like a dwarf bush)
