= Symphony No. 3 (Szymanowski) =

1916 orchestral and vocal work by Karol Szymanowski

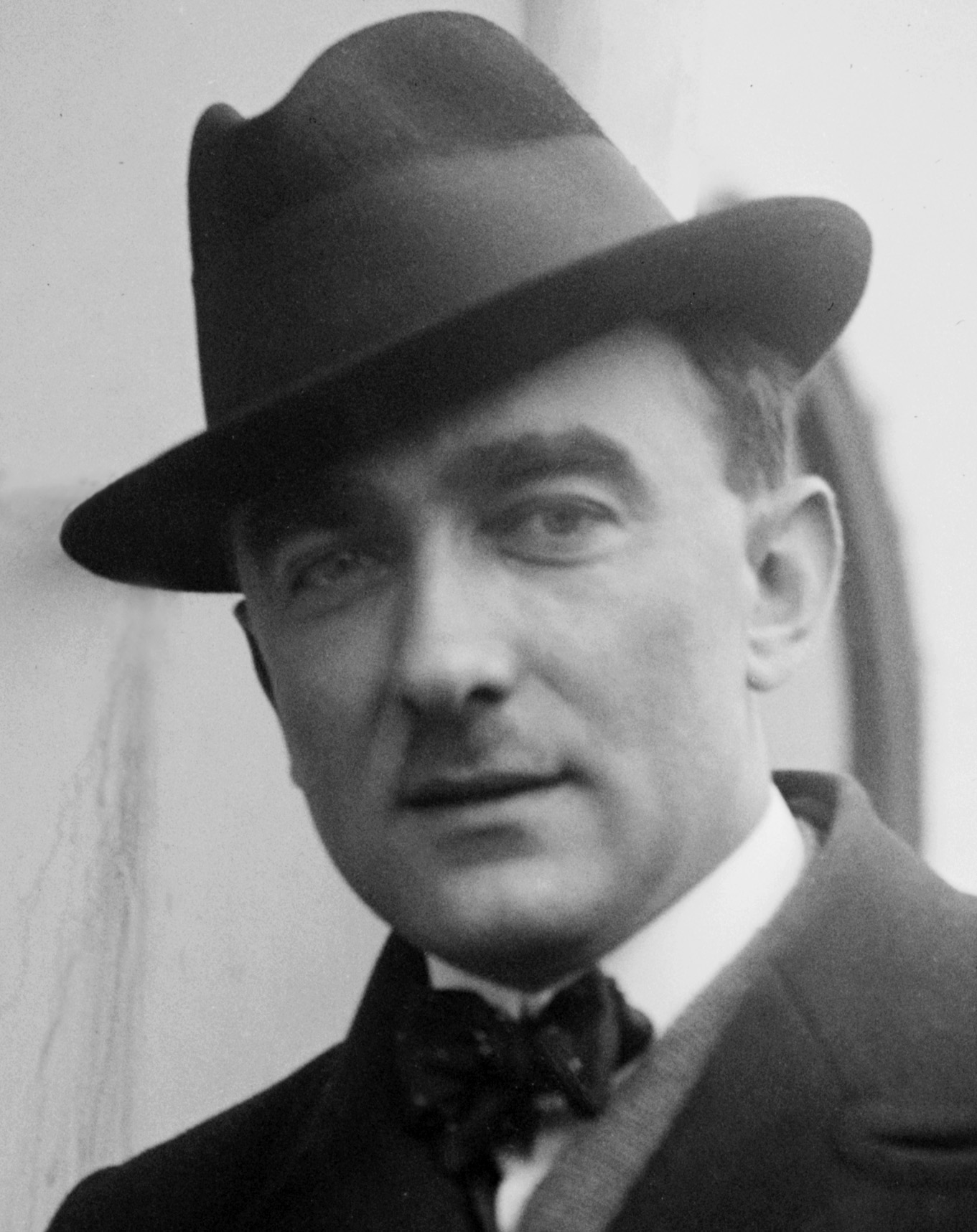
Karol Szymanowski in 1922

Symphony No. 3, Op. 27, titled Song of the Night, is a work for chorus and orchestra, with a solo part for tenor voice, by Karol Szymanowski. He completed it in 1916 after a period travelling Eastern Europe. Its sung text is a poem by 13th-century Persian mystic Jalal ud-Din Rumi as translated into Polish by Tadeusz Miciński, a friend of the composer; it celebrates the beauty of the Eastern night. Although an instrumental version of the symphony was played in London in 1921, the full world premiere with chorus and tenor soloist came only 3 February 1928 in Lwów. Considered today to be one of Szymanowski's finest works, Song of the Night lasts about 25 minutes.

== Form ==
The symphony is influenced by Richard Wagner's Tristan and Isolde and Szymanowski derives from Frédéric Chopin's use of chromatic harmony as in his nocturnes to depict the character of night. Another influence is Alexander Scriabin's symphonic poem, Prometheus from which the symphony derives a mystical aura, its one-movement symphonic design, its (partly) wordless chorus, the large orchestra, its climactic organ and its use of a piano (though not as a concertante instrument but rather as an extremely important textural element). A prominent feature of the work is the composer's formation of unique melodic voices moving independently of one another, in a manner which can be described as 'interwoven polymelody'.

The symphony is in one movement and normally takes around 25 minutes to perform. However, some recordings typically split the symphony into three unnumbered movements without a break between the first and second movements (attacca):

1. Moderato assai
2. Vivace scherzando (bar 128) - Allegretto tranquillo (bar 147)
3. Largo (bar 398)

== Instrumentation ==
Szymanowski scored his symphony for a very large orchestra consisting of standard instruments, as well as unusual “instruments” (for a symphony) such as a solo tenor and an ad lib choir:

Woodwinds

piccolo
3 flutes
3 oboes
cor anglais
clarinet in E♭
3 clarinets in B♭
bass Clarinet
3 bassoons
contrabassoon

Brass

6 horns in F
4 trumpets in B♭
4 trombones
tuba

Percussion

timpani

cymbals (crash and suspended)
bass drum
tam-tam
glockenspiel
triangle
snare drum
tambourine

Keyboards

piano
celesta
organ

Voices

choir
S-A-T-B
tenor solo

Strings

2 harps
1st and 2nd violins
violas
cellos
contra basses
