= Henry Wilberforce Clarke =

Henry Wilberforce Clarke (1840–1905) was a British translator of Persian works by mystic poets Saadi, Hafez, Nizami and Suhrawardi, as well as writing some works himself. He was an officer in the British India corps Bengal Engineers, and the grandson of William Stanley Clarke, Director (1815–1842) and Chairman (1835–1836) of the East India Company.

== Biography ==
Born in 1840, his father was Richard Henley Clarke and mother was Charlotte Raikes (Clarke). His siblings were William Henley Stanley Clarke, Caroline Eliza Stanley Clarke and Alice Mary Clarke. His grandfather was William Stanley Clarke, Director (1815–1842) and later chairman (1835–1836) of the East India Company.

He started his career with the Royal Engineers, and joined Bengal Engineers, then a part of the British Indian Army's Bengal Army, in 1860. He took part in the Abyssinia campaign of 1867, Nile Expedition of 1884–1885, and was subsequently made Lt. Colonel in 1887.

Henry Wilberforce Clarke, the subject of this memoir, was born in 1840, educated at Cheltenham College, and finally at Addiscombe (1858—1860) which he left, second of his "batch” (the last batch of the old Indian Engineers), as a lieutenant in the old Bengal Engineers (8 June, 186o). After the usual time under instruction at Chatham, he went out to India in October 1862, and in May, 1863, joined the Indian Public Works Department, wherein he soon made his mark. A fine career in the P.W.D. might now have been expected for him. Unfortunately his health broke down early (in 1865); and this, with subsequent attacks, necessitated prolonged sick leave to Europe (1865–66, 1869–72, 1880–84), and thus broke up his continuous service In India and prevented his ever rising to the higher posts of the Department. Whilst in India he held at times some very good posts, e.g., Assistant to Chief Engineer and Assistant Secretary to Government in P.W.D in 1865, and again in 1868–69; Deputy Consulting Engineer for Railways 1876-80 and 1888–8, and Consulting Engineer, 1890. His sick leaves to Europe led, however, to his seeing a varied service, both in the field and otherwise, in parts of the world not usually open to the old Indian Engineer. Thus he was Assistant Field Engineer with the Abyssinian Expedition (i86-6S), was mentioned in despatches for "excellent service” and obtained the medal. After exchanging to home service in 1882 he was selected to project the Suakin-Berber Railway (1884); served as Director of Railways in Egypt in 1884; and was an A.A.G. with the Nile Expedition ( 1884–85 ) with which he advanced as far as Dongola being subsequently mentioned in despatches arid receiving the medal with clasp and star. After this he became C.R.R. at Devonport. (1885–86), and C.R.E. in S. Africa, 1886–88. After a further short period of service in India, as Consulting Engineer for Railways (1890–91), he retired in 1891 as a Lieut.- Colonel. After some years travel abroad he settled down on the small property of Dilkusha, of about 100 acres at Sestri Levante in Liguria, favourable to the growth of the olive, vine, orange, fig etc., :and busied himself thereafter in the improvement of their cultivation. He died there of heart complaint on the 5th October, 1905. He was twice married (first in 1872, again in 1897). By the first wife who died in 1893, he leaves two sons and two daughters. His second wife survives, and contributes most of the materials for this short biography. The two sons are still engaged in the improvement of their father's estate. Two instances of Clarke's versatility may be given. He was selected from those on the Nile Expeditions (1884) to determine the latitude and longitude of certain positions in the Nile valley, a work which would be assigned in India to the staff of the Indian Survey. Again, he had a strong taste for languages, so much so that in spite of prolonged absences from India - he became a competent Persian scholar, and was selected by the Bengal Asiatic Society as translator of part of the ‘Aini-i-Akbari, and was even a candidate for the chair of Persian at Oxford, 1880. He published, among other works, the following:—A "Persian Manual (1878), which was adopted by Government for the Indo-European Telegraph Staff. Translations into English prose of four of the great Persian poems:-1., The Bustán of Sadi (1879); 2. The Sikandar Nama-e-Nizámi (1881)800 pp.; 3. The Diwán-i- Háfiz (1891) 2 vols.; 4. The Sháh-Nama-e-Firdausi, 1000 pp. These volumes have received the warm appreciation of many scholars (including the late Sir H Rawlinson, Sir Monier Williams, and Prof. Max Muller), and form a lasting monument of the author’s talents and industry. It remains to record some personal traits. Clarke was rather short of stature, and of a genial, though somewhat combative disposition; a warm friend, and a good hitter-out (especially in writing) at an adversary. He was familiarly known among his intimates by the “pet” name of “Boxer”, and accordingly sometimes passed as “Mr. Boxer” among those who only knew him by this style; thus he was habitually called "Mr Boxer" by the old tar (familiarly known as "Ben” ) in charge of the RE. Boat Club boats (1860–62), much to the amusement of Clarke's companions. Clarke was very popular among the younger officers when he had himself become a senior. An amusing instance of this occurred after a big dinner at the Chatham Mess. After dinner was over (and the seniors had all left the table) there arose a call among the juniors present that Clarke should take the chair and deliver a speech (he being a good raconteur, and a humorous after-dinner speaker); as he was about to take his seat, the chair disappeared, and the would-be occupant subsided on the floor to find himself smothered in a shower of rose leaves.

ALLAN CUNNINGHAM, Lt.-Col., late R.E. (Bengal).

<This memoir of Lt Colonel Henry Wilberforce Clarke was transcribed from The Royal Engineers Journal Vol III No 3, March 1906 pp 192,193 because the original PDF was very hard to read and not as easily located on the web as the Wikipedia entries for Lt Colonel Clarke are.>

== Personal life ==
He married Florence Lucy Hurt Sitwell in 1872 at St James's Church, Westminster, London. After his wife's death he married Anna Elizabeth Pudney (1853–1938) on 7 Jan 1897 at Heybridge, Essex, England. Anna's parents were Quakers and pacifists so conversations with their son-in-law, a retired Lieutenant Colonel of the Bengal Engineers, may have been rigorous.

He died in Italy on October 4, 1905, and is buried in Sestri Levante.

== Hafez ==
Wilberforce Clarke was the author of a critical translation of The Dīvān of Hafez, printed at his expense at the Central Press of the Government of India, Calcutta (1889–1891)

The work (1891) was presented as follows:

The Dīvān
written in the fourteenth century
by
Khwāja Shamsu-d-Dīn Muhammad-i-Hāfiz-i-Shīrāzī
otherwise known as
Lisānu-l-Ghaib and Tarjumānu-l-Asrār.

Translated for the first time out of the Persian into English prose, with critical and explanatory remarks, with an introductory preface, with a note on Sūfī, ism, and with a life of the author,

by: Lieut.-Col. H. Wilberforce Clarke
Royal (late Bengal) Engineers,
Life-Member of the Royal Asiatic Society of Great Britain and Ireland; and Member of the Asiatic Society of Bengal.
Author of "The Persian Manual";
first translator (out of the Persian) of the "Būstān-i-Sa'dī" (Saadi) and of "The Sikandar Nāma,-i-Nīzamī" (Nizami)
Author of "Notes on Elephants"; of "The Sextant"; of "Longitude by Lunar Distance"; and of "The Transverse Strength of a Railway-Rail"

The book was dedicated to his uncle Henry M. Clarke, Bengal Civil Service (1826), winner of a gold medal for Persian at Haileybury,

In 1974 a facsimile edition of Clarke's translation was published by The Octagon Press.

== Works ==
=== As translator ===
- The Divan of Hafez
- Saadi's Bostan
- The Sikandar Nama (Romance of Alexander) of Nizami
- "A Dervish Textbook" (a partial translation of the Gifts of Deep Knowledge, the Awarif el-Maarif) by Suhrawardi (1891). This book was reprinted by Octagon Press in 1980.

=== Own works ===
- The Persian Manual. Wm. H Allen & Co., London. 1878.
- Notes on Elephants
- The Sextant
- Longitude by Lunar Distance
- The Transverse Strength of a Railway-Rail
- Report on the Railway Famine-traffic: in the Presidencies of Madras and Bombay and Mysore. Central Press, Calcutta. 1880.
