= Violin Concerto No. 2 (Szymanowski) =

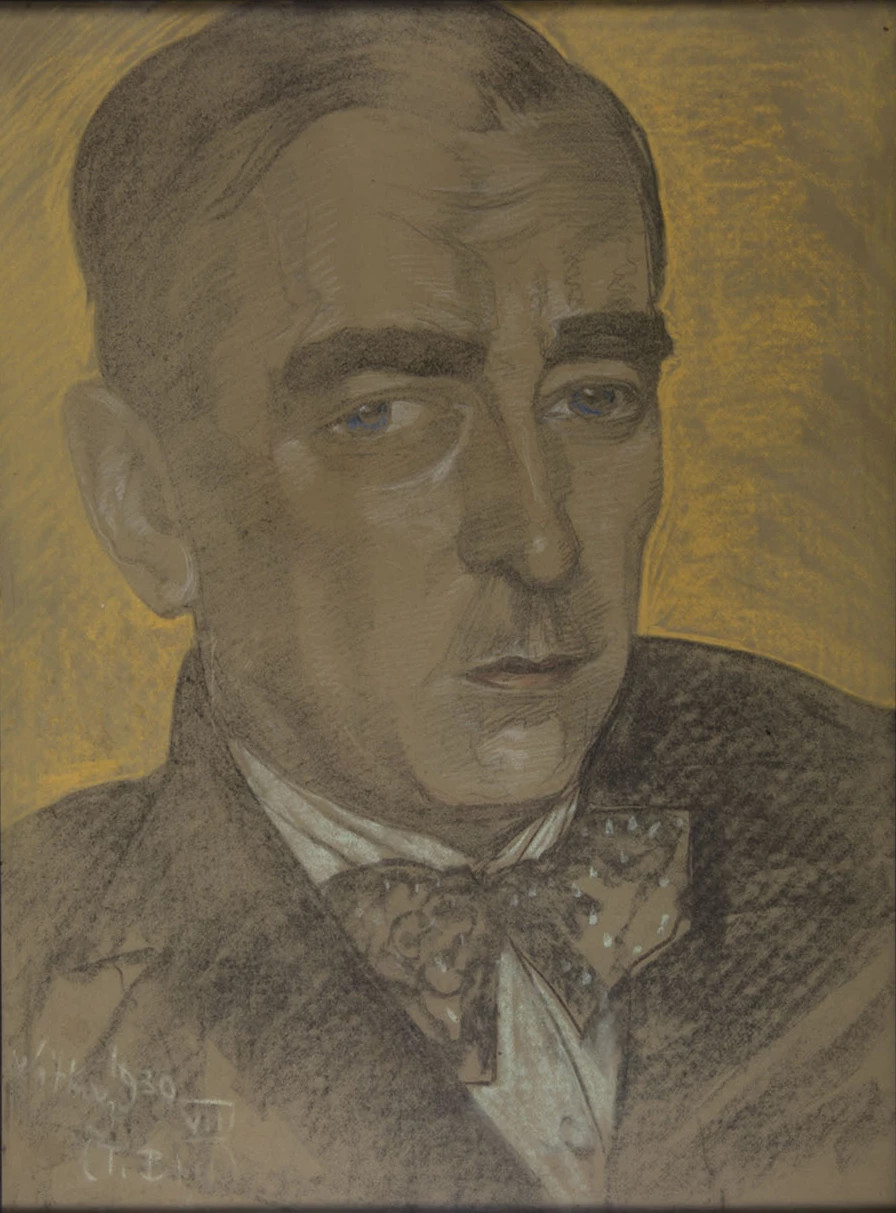
Portrait of Karol Szymanowski, 1930

Karol Szymanowski's Violin Concerto No. 2, Op. 61 was written between 1932 and 1933 and was the composer's last major work before his death in 1937.

The concerto was written at the request of Paweł Kochański, to whom Szymanowski had dedicated his first concerto in 1916. Kochański and his wife Zofia visited Szymanowski in the summer of 1932 in Zakopane where Paweł provided help with the violin part, and later also provided a cadenza. Szymanowski wrote the work in less than four weeks. Kochański premiered the work on 6 October 1933 in Warsaw. After his death in 1934, the composer added the dedication "A la memoire du Grand Musicien, mon cher et inoubliable Ami, Paweł Kochański" before publishing the concerto.

The second concerto is very different from the composer's first, following a more traditional harmonic approach, featuring extensive use of modes, and like the majority of music from Szymanowski's late period, drawing influences from Polish highlander music. It was written shortly after the Fourth Symphony (which Szymanowski described in letters as his ”piano concerto”) which it shares many similarities with.

It is scored for solo violin, 2 flutes (2nd doubling piccolo), 2 oboes (2nd doubling English horn), 2 clarinets (2nd doubling E♭ clarinet), 2 bassoons (2nd doubling contrabassoon), 4 horns, 2 trumpets, 3 trombones, tuba, percussion, piano, and strings.

== Structure ==
The concerto is in single-movement, almost rhapsodic form, although it could be divided into four major sections:

1. Moderato – Molto tranquillo
2. Andantino sostenuto
3. Allegramente – Molto energico
4. Andantino – Molto tranquillo

It features a lengthy cadenza in the middle which provides the transition between the Andantino and Allegramente sections. At circa 22 minutes, it is relatively short for a violin concerto of the time. Before the premiere, Kochański suggested that Szymanowski should write a prologue to prolong the concerto to 25-30 minutes, although this never happened.
