= Variations (Szymanowski) =

Composition by Karol Szymanowski

- by Karol Szymanowski
- Karol Szymanowski in the 1910s.
- Key: B-flat minor
- Opus: 3
- Year: 1901-03
- Period: Romanticism
- Dedication: Arthur Rubinstein
- Duration: 10-12 minutes

Variations in B-flat minor, Op. 3, is a work for solo piano, written in 1901–1903 by Polish composer Karol Szymanowski. They are dedicated to Arthur Rubinstein.

== Composition and musicality ==
In 1901, at the age of 18, Szymanowski was sent to the Warsaw Conservatory to develop his musical craft. He did not take piano lessons, instead focusing on composition. The Variations were written during his time studying composition and counterpoint under Zygmunt Noskowski. There, he also developed a strong friendship with pianist Arthur Rubinstein, who was to become the dedicatee of the work.

The variations are markedly romantic in both style and structure, with a bold and exploratory sense of harmony and chromaticism, and were described by Classic Review as belonging to "dark romanticism". Each individual variation contrasts sharply with another in mood, tonality and tempo, and often depart from the basic outline of the theme while keeping its harmonic structure, in the 19th-century tradition of "character variations". All variations are linked attaca with each other; they are to be played in a continuous manner.

The musical style is improvisatory and highly ornamental. In its expansive use of polyphony, 3-against-2 rhythms, harmonic exploration and emotional contrasts, the Variations recall the influence of Chopin, Brahms and Schumann, and in particular Brahms' Variations and Fugue on a Theme of Haendel. The influence of Polish folk music, which would come to guide Szymanowski's aesthetic and artistic philosophy later on, is noticeable in the inclusion of a mazurka in Variation 3.

== Notable recordings ==
Year	Pianist	Album	Label
2008	Felicja Blumental	The Spirit of Poland: Szymanowski and Chopin	Brana
2010	Rafał Blechacz	Piano Recital	CD Accord
2015	Martin Roscoe	Szymanowski: Complete Piano Works	Naxos
2016	Szymon Nehring	Chopin, Szymanowski and Mykietin: Works for Piano	Dux
2024	Jonathan Fournel	Chopin and Szymanowski	Alpha
2026	Peter Jablonski	Szymanowski: Complete Piano Works, Vol. 1	Ondine
