= The Love Songs of Hafiz =

Song cycle by Polish composer Karol Szymanowski

- Song cycle by Karol Szymanowski
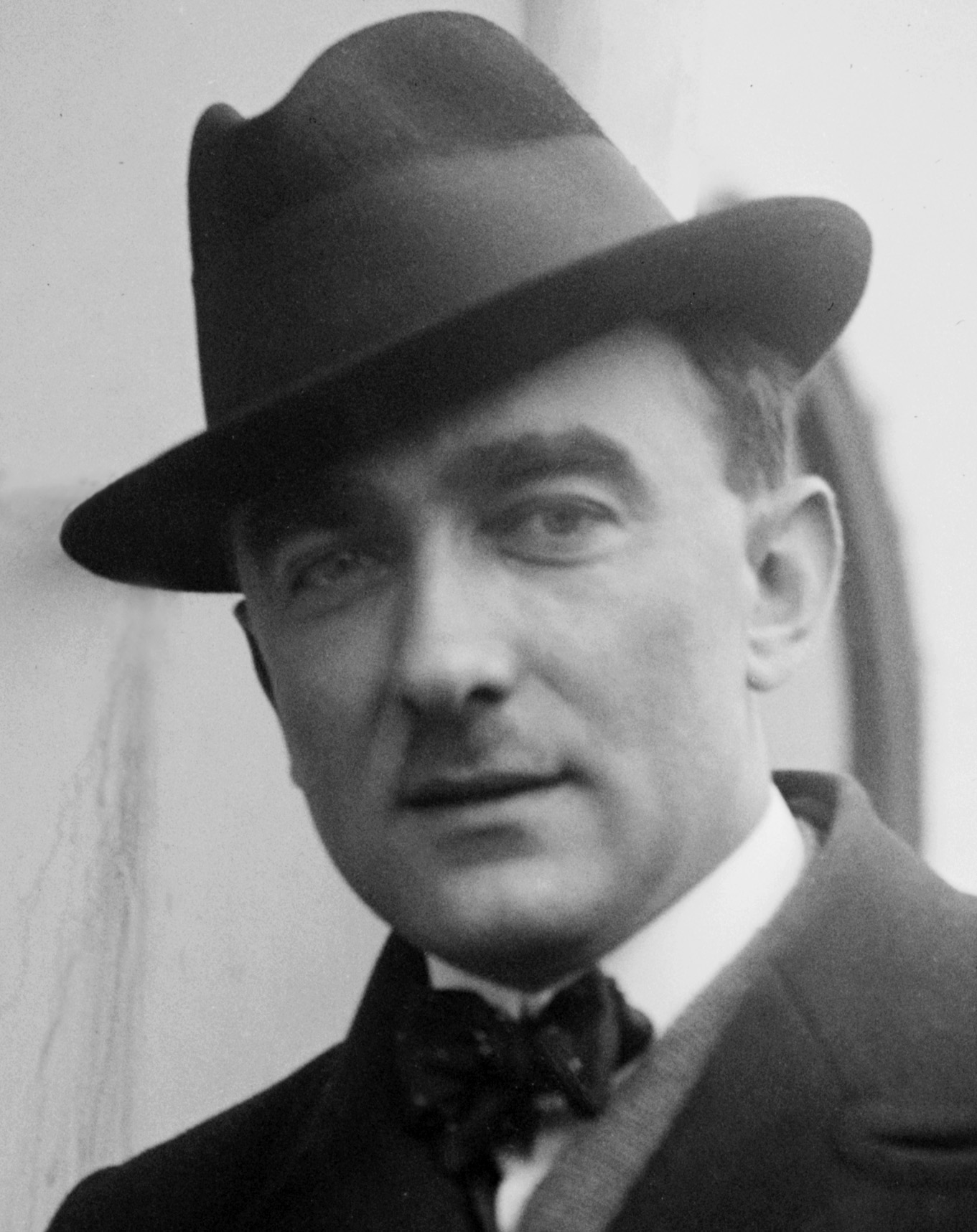
- The composer in 1922
- Opus: 24
- Text: poems by Hafez
- Language: German
- Composed: 1911
- Performed: 1912
- Scoring: voice and piano

The Love Songs of Hafiz (German: Des Hafis Liebeslieder) is the name of two song cycles by Karol Szymanowski, Op. 24, with piano accompaniment, and Op. 26, with orchestral accompaniment. There are six songs in Op. 24, three of them orchestrated in Op. 26, and five additional songs, unique to Op. 26. They were composed in Vienna, Austria, in 1911 and 1914, respectively. The works represent a transition between the first and second periods of the composer's style.

== Background ==
The six songs contained in Szymanowski's Op. 24, composed in 1911, represent the transition from the composer's early, 'Germanic’ late-romantic style reminiscent of Richard Wagner and Richard Strauss into his pre-modern middle period marked by a fascination with oriental themes. In his previous collections of songs, the composer set poetry from the Young Poland group as well as the German Romantics. However, prior to this cycle's composition Szymanowski began to stray from the Young Poland poetry and had become infatuated with the writings and ideals of the great 14th-century Persian poet Mohammed Hafiz of Shiraz (also known as "Hafez"). Szymanowski first encountered Hafiz's texts in a volume of his poetry at the Imperial Library in Vienna in 1911. This discovery apparently unleashed an outpouring of creativity in the composer. While setting the texts, Szymanowski wrote in a letter to friend and musicologist [Zdzislaw Jachimecki], "I am extremely moved by my Hafiz. Allah Himself has thrust him into my hands. I think these texts are ideal...".

His enthusiasm for this cycle continued through to its completion, as he is quoted in another letter to his friend Stefan Spiess stating, "I have composed a new song cycle after words by Hafiz, a wonderful poet... You cannot imagine what satisfaction this work has been giving me". The songs were premiered by Szymanowski's sister, soprano Stanislawa Szymanowska and pianist Arthur Rubinstein in 1912. Szymanowski's love for the poetry of Hafiz continued to grow and in 1914, the composer scored the first, fourth and fifth songs from his Op. 24 and added five new settings creating The Love Songs of Hafiz, Op. 26 for voice and orchestra.

The Op. 24 cycle is clearly a transitional work, due to the highly Romantic musical settings of the exotic texts of Hafiz. Yet in the first, fourth and fifth songs of the cycle, Szymanowski gives a glimpse of his new direction with the blurring of tonality reminiscent of the exotic works of Claude Debussy and Maurice Ravel popular in Europe during this time. The Op. 24 cycle sums up his previous works as a composer in the early Romantic style and prepares for the next phase of his compositions, many of which were inspired by oriental and exotic colors, which established his reputation outside of Young Poland.

== Poetry ==
Although the texts are in German, this is a paraphrased version of Hafiz's Persian poems by Hans Bethge. Hafiz of Shiraz, the original poet, was a supreme master of Persian ghazel poem in the 14th century. The ghazel is a typical form of Persian lyrical poem in early middle-ages which have themes of love, wine, physical beauty, and intoxication. The most notable collection of the ghazels is called Divan-i Hafiz. This poetry is hugely influenced later poets not only in Persia but in other countries as well, and was later translated into many Western languages. Hafiz, who, unlike other Persian poets, embraced the humanist and tactile qualities of ecstasy on earth in relation to the ultimate pleasure when the earthly proved inadequate: death. Death as ecstasy is a vital theme throughout the texts, paraphrased by Hans Bethge, who also provided the translation for Gustav Mahler's Das Lied von der Erde. Hans Bethge, a German poet, scholar, and translator, was most famous for his translations of Oriental works rather than his poems. His unique but extraordinary musical versification inspired many composers such as Eisler, Krenek, Mahler, Strauss, Schoenberg, Ullmann, Webern, and Szymanowski. For Hafiz poems, Bethge did not miss the Persian impressionism in his translation. Hafiz's poetic sensibility of “Pure lyric gift, refined, sensuous, and aromatic” is regarded very alike to Szymanoski's musical sensibility.

== Songs ==
Wünsche, (‘Wishes’) begins the cycle. The text is an epitomic example of Hafiz's sensibility. The illustrations of nature in a series of four couplets represent the narrator's longings for his lover. The piano accompaniment is chromatic, with perpetual motion meandering around the key of F# Major and a brief minor-third tonicization on Eb-Major at the climax of the piece, on the repetition of the words ‘Und du’ (And you). This repetition also occurs on the highest vocal pitch of the piece, and disrupts the flow of each textual line of eleven syllables by expanding it to thirteen, further marking it as the climax of the song. Szymanowski uses text painting, a common trait of the German Lied, by composing an ascending whole-tone scale and placing the word ‘Sonne’ on the top of the scale, as the sun is in the sky. The “exotic” text is illustrated with the use of a whole-tone scale, yet the harmony and arc-like shape of the piece reflects more of an influence by the late German romantic school.

The next two songs, Die einzige Arzenei (‘The only Medicine’) and Die brennenden Tulpen (‘The flaming Tulips’) share the subject which was a common poetical theme in the Young Poland group, death: the only medicine for the yearning pain of existence. A cyclical, ‘tortured, and highly chromatic progression’ opens the song, illustrating the writhing of someone who is suffering, the obfuscation of a tonal center, and the ‘exotic’ East Orient, through the descending semi-tones used as a symbolic tool by European composers of the time. This motivic element at once reveals the three elements Szymanowski's developing compositional style. One, it bears a striking resemblance to that of the opening of the third song from Debussy’s Les Chansons de Bilitis, ‘Le Tombeau des Naïades,’ or, 'the grave of the water-nymphs', symbolizing the end of Bilitis’ erotic journey through love. However, whereas Debussy, in true impressionistic style uses this motive to paint the ‘impression’ of a forest in wintertime, Szymanowski's use can be interpreted as much more specific, the protagonist writhing in pain. Two, while the tonal center is vague, as in that of an impressionist work, the melody is still broad, searching for the tonic, and thus tonality is still important, and the song indeed ends in both voice and piano in B Major. Again, the shape of the vocal line is an arc, reaching a climax this time on G#. Three, the use of descending semi-tones to depict the exotic is a European idiom that was used by both French composers, such as in Ravel’s Shéhérazade, and German, such as in Strauss’ Salome. Since Szymanowski would not travel to the East until 1914, these secondary influences were what he channeled to express his fascination with the exotic.

The melody of Die brennenden Tulpen combines the use of semi-tones for color, rather than to embellish a tonal center and whole-tone scales, which avoid a tonal center for their lack of leading tones, to establish the mood of the song, a slow-burning, yet passionate, perpetual fire that continues, even in death. The harmony of the piano line is constantly moving, depicting a constantly burning fire, rather than establishing a linear harmonic structure. The arc of this piece seems to come out of nowhere, on a sudden leap to an A-natural, a half-step higher than the peak of the previous song, on the word ‘Liebesgluten,’ or ‘glowing, fiery love.’ The song does finally cadence in Bb Major, with the voice ending on F, the fifth. So, whereas the last song's accompaniment illustrated specific images, this accompaniment paints more of an impression, representing Szymanowski's progression from the German romantic style to the French impressionistic style.

The fourth piece in the cycle, Tanz (Dance), is the most ‘prophetic’ of Szymanowski's new style. ‘It is perhaps in this one song that it is possible to see the bridge between Szymanowski’s “Germanic” mode of expression and the later, middle-period style.’ Though ‘dance was a recurring feature of Szymanowski’s music,’ this one differs ‘from the earlier, rather heavier examples,’ exhibiting ‘more refined, rocking rhythms’ found in some of his middle-period pieces, such as Metopes, op. 29, and the interludes of his Third Symphony. There is an A pedal in the left hand of the piano for much of the song, though at the beginning of the piece it is embellished by a G minor triad, and at the end by a repeated chromatic motive alternated with an octave E in the right hand, ‘dying away to an open fifth, leaving an abiding impression of near stasis,’ thus placing little emphasis on structural tonality. The climax of this piece occurs on a G# resolving briefly to an A, suggesting a turning point in the structure of the cycle itself, as the past three songs have peaked at G, G# and A, respectively. Also, this text is the most descriptively ‘exotic’ in its illustration of a tribal dance in which some only wear shoes and some are naked. To Szymanowski, who was seeking freedom of expression himself, the taboo of nudity was a tangible element of those pleasures forbidden to the Europeans yet allowed to the ‘heathens’ of the far East.

Der verliebte Ostwind (The East wind in love) is the fifth in the set, and one of the three songs Szymanowski selected from op. 24 to include in his second set of Hafiz liebeslieder, op. 26 for solo voice and orchestra. In this song as in the other two, he relies less on functional tonality as on creating a mood, in this case, of a sweeping wind that is personifying one wild and drunk with love. The accompaniment is a constant ascending and descending of arpeggios and scales, painting an impression of the wind, upon which the voice is the message that the wind bears, mostly in broad half and quarter notes traveling chromatically in half steps with the occasional leap. This synthesis of piano and voice illustrates one concept, rather than the text painting of individual words as in the first piece. In keeping with the overall shape of the set, the range of the song peaks on a G, leading into the dynamic climax on a G flat on the word ‘Schonheit,’ or ‘beauty.’ The harp-like accompaniment ends on a D octave, but there is no triad and therefore no feeling of cadence.

The final song of the set, Trauriger Frühling (Sad spring) ties together the underlying themes of the cycle: nature, yearning, love, suffering, and death. The opening is rhythmically, similar to that of the first song, and the dynamic marking is also similar: what was first andante dolcissimo is now andante dolcissimo e molto espressivo. Whether or not these markings are those of the publisher or of Szymanowski himself, they are indicative of this transitional piece, representing Szymanowski's progression from German romanticism to adding elements of French impressionism. There are elements of both in this song. Underlining the text ‘The earth holds you fast in her darkness,’ the accompaniment illustrates the darkness and depth of the grave with low descending octaves in the left hand as the right hand exhibits a series of non-functional chords that obscure the light with chromatics filling in every crack. Then, there is specific text painting, when the melody exhibits a descending whole tone scale, depicting ‘from your depths,’ then rises at ‘you shall rise as Spring’s most beautiful flower!” Finally, there is a cadence in D major, the key of optimism, symbolizing the emergence of Spring from Winter, or, the emergence of life from death.

== Texts and translation ==
Wünsche

Ich wollt’, ich wär’ ein morgenklarer See und du, die Sonne, die sich darin spiegelt. Ich wollt’, ich wär’ ein Quell im Wiesengrunde und du die Blume, die sich darin anlacht. Ich wollt’, ich wär’ ein grüner Dorn am Busche und du die Rose, die ihn rot umschimmert. Ich wollt’, ich wär’ ein kleines Korn im Sande und du der Vogel, der es schnell, schnell auf pickt!

Wishes

I wish I were a morning-clear lake and you the sun, reflecting in it. I wish I were a spring in the meadows and you the flower, laughing at yourself in it. I wish I were a green thorn on a bush and you the rose, shimmering red around it. I wish I were a small grain of sand and you the bird, picking it swiftly up.

Die einzige Arznei

Ja, ich bin krank, ich weiß, doch laßt mich! Mir kann der beste nicht der Ärzte helfen. Es gibt kein mittel gegen diese Wunden, die so verheerend glühn in meiner Brust. Nur Eine kann mir helfen, jene Eine, die mir das süße Gift gab, dran ich kranke. Daß sie mich liebte! Ich ware gleich gesund.

The only medicine

Yes, I am ill, I know, I know, but leave me! The very best doctor cannot help me. There is no cure for these wounds, which burn so devastatingly in my breast. Only one can help me, that one who gave me the sweet poison, on which I sicken If she only loved me! I would recover instantly.

Die brennenden Tulpen

Einst aus meinem Grabe warden ungezählte rote Tulpen, rote Tulpen Flammen sprießen. Staune nicht ob dieses Wunders, sondern, Herliche, bedenke, bedenke, welche ungeheure Gluten, dir geweihte Liebesgluten, in dem Lebenden einst brannten, da der Topte noch so glüht.

The burning tulips

Some day countless red tulips, red tulips flames shall sprout from my grave. Do not be amazed at this wonder, rather, splendid one, consider, consider, the mighty glow, a glow of love devoted to you, which once burned so much in life, that in death it still glows.

Tanz

Heute tanzt alles, alles tanzt! Göttlich ist Tanz! Göttlich ist Tanz! Manche tanzen in Strüpfen, manche in Schuhen nur, manche nackt! Hoch, ihr nackten Tänzerinnen, hoch! Ihr Schösten und Kühnsten! Heute tanzt alles, alles tanzt! Göttlich ist Tanz! Göttlich ist Tanz!

Dance

Today all dance, all, all dance! Divine is dance! Divine, divine is dance! Some dance in their stockings, some only in their shoes, some naked! High! High, you naked dancers, high! You beautiful and bold ones! Today all dance, all, all dance! Divine is dance! Divine is dance!

Der verliebte Ostwind

Ich Unglückseliger! Wer gibt mir Nachricht von meiner Liebsten? Zwar der Ostwind kam und raunte hastig Botschaft mir ins Ohr, doch raunte er so stmmelnd und verwirrt, daß ich ihn nicht verstand! Ich weiß es wohl, Er selber ist der Ärmste, ganz betrunken und geisteswirr durch meiner Liebsten Schönheit.

The lovesick East wind

O unhappy me! Who will give me news of my dearest? The east wind did indeed come and whisper a rushed message in my ear, but he whispered so confusedly and a-stutter, that I could not understand him! How well I know, how well I know, He is himself the most miserable, totally drunk and deranged by the beauty of my dearest.

Trauriger Frühling

Der Frühling ist erschienen. Hyazinten und Tulpen und Narzissen Steigen lachend aus allen Beeten auf. Doch wo bleibst du? Die Erde hält dich fest in ihrem Dunkel. Ich werde weinen gleich der Frühlingswolke, Vielleicht daß du dann doch aus deiner Tiefe Emporsteigst, als des Lenzes schönste Blume!

Sad spring

Spring has appeared. Hyacinths and tulips and daffodils rise laughing from all their beds. But where are you? Where are you? The earth holds you fast in her darkness. I shall weep like the Spring's clouds, perhaps then you shall rise from your depths, as Spring's most beautiful flower!

== Selected discography ==
Recording	Performer	Label	Year
The Complete Songs of Szymanowski	Urszula Kryger and Reinild Mees	Channel Classics	2004
Karol Szymanowski: Lieder	Dorothy Dorow and Rudolf Jansen	Electra/Helicon	2005
