= Violin Concerto No. 1 (Szymanowski) =

- by Karol Szymanowski
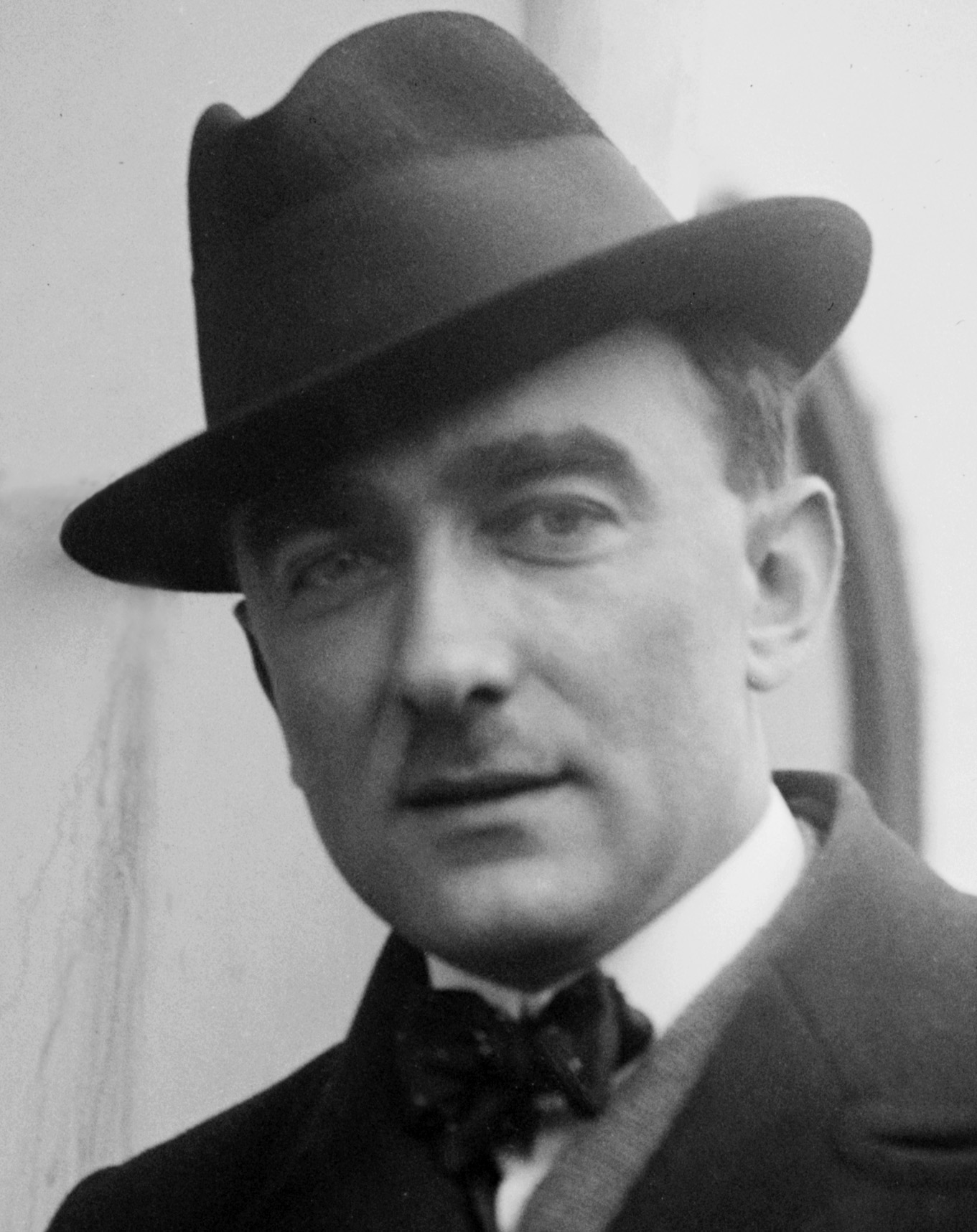
- Karol Szymanowski in 1922.
- Opus: 35
- Period: Modern
- Form: Violin concerto
- Composed: 1916
- Dedication: Paul Kochanski
- Duration: 18-20 minutes
- Movements: One

Premiere
- Date: 1922
- Location: Warsaw
- Conductor: Emil Młynarski

The Violin Concerto No. 1, Op. 35, is the first of Karol Szymanowski's two concertos for violin and orchestra, written in 1916. Due to its exploratory harmonic writing and orchestral textures, it is considered one of the first modern violin concertos. The work is dedicated to Paul Kochanski.

== Composition ==
The Violin Concerto No. 1 was written in 1916 while the composer was in Zarudzie, Poland. Like many other violin works by Szymanowski, the concerto was born from Szymanowski's close friendship with Russian violinist Paul Kochanski, who provided advice to Szymanowski regarding violin technique during the composition of the concerto. Kochanski later wrote the cadenza for the work.

The premiere of the concerto was delayed by the unrest caused by the Bolshevik revolution and World War 1, leading to a change in date and venue. It finally was premiered on the 1st of November 1922 in Warsaw, with Józef Ozimiński as the soloist and the Warsaw Philharmonic under Emil Młynarski's direction. Szymanowski was highly satisfied by the performance, writing to Kochanski after the concert, "The sound is so magical that people here were completely transfixed." The American premiere was given by Kochanski and the Philadelphia Orchestra two years later at Carnegie Hall, New York, under Leopold Stokowski's direction.

== Instrumentation ==
It is scored for solo violin, 3 flutes (3rd doubling piccolo), 3 oboes (3rd doubling English horn), 3 clarinets (3rd doubling E♭ clarinet), bass clarinet, 3 bassoons (3rd doubling contrabassoon), 4 horns, 3 trumpets, 3 trombones, tuba, percussion, celesta, piano, 2 harps and strings.

== Structure ==
The violin concerto is structured in one continuous movement, which can be divided into five sections:

1. Vivace assai
2. Tempo comodo. Andantino
3. Vivace scherzando
4. Tempo comodo. Allegretto
5. Cadenza. Vivace – Allegro moderato

The opening Vivace assai establishes the atmosphere of the work, with soaring solo violin lines over a musical landscape featuring prominent use of harp, woodwinds and percussion. An intensely dramatic orchestral buildup and multiple waves of acceleration give way to a calmer landscape into the Andantino, with cascading melodic lines featuring the violin and celesta in unison. The central Vivace scherzando is an agitated moto perpetuo. The ensuing Allegretto returns to a more introspective and lyrical atmosphere. The final three-minute long cadenza blends and transforms the concerto's main melodic material, before the piece ends on a return to the initial apeased atmosphere in triple pianissimo.

A performance takes approximately 18 to 20 minutes.

== Musical characteristics ==
The Violin Concerto No. 1 is considered to be innovative in that it breaks away from the typical folk-inspired romantism of early 20th-century Polish classical music, exploring instead folk's potential as the bedrock for expressive material in modern music, in a manner parallel to Béla Bartók's attitude towards Hungarian folk. The concerto borrows partly from the French musical tradition (and particularly Claude Debussy's music), especially in its orchestration, owing to Szymanowski's admiration for and aesthetic resonance with French music. Indeed, the composer declared in 1914: “I shall never cease in the conviction [that] a true and deep understanding of French music, of its content, its form, and its further evolution, is one of the conditions for the development of our Polish music.” Despite its modernist spirit, the concerto remains intensely romantic in its melodic and dynamic writing.

Harmonically, the concerto borrows as much from Eastern European musical traditions as it does from Sicilian music, a source of inspiration for the composer after his travels to Italy. The writing features a heavy use of minor thirds and semitones, with melodic lines not often resolving; the writing follows aesthetic principles of tension and relaxation rather than traditional tonality.

The likely inspiration for the concerto was Noc Majowa (May Night), a poem by the Polish poet Tadeusz Miciński, a fellow member of the Young Poland artistic movement:

All the birds pay tribute to me
for today I wed a goddess.
And now we stand by the lake in crimson blossom
in flowing tears of joy, with rapture and fear,
burning in amorous conflagration.

The influence of the poem transpires through the intensely imagistic and ecstatic nature of the concerto's writing.

== Reception and posterity ==
The concerto inspired Béla Bartók when writing his Second Violin Concerto.

== Notable recordings ==
Year	Violinist	Orchestra	Conductor	Comments
1948	Eugenia Umińska	Philharmonia Orchestra	Gregor Fitelberg	First recording of this work.
1955	Roman Totenberg	Boston Symphony Orchestra	Pierre Monteux	
1950s	Roman Totenberg	Poznań Philharmonic Symphony Orchestra	Stanislaw Wislocki	
1959	David Oistrakh	Saint Petersburg Philharmonic Orchestra	Kurt Sanderling	
1961	Wanda Wiłkomirska	Warsaw Philharmonic Orchestra	Witold Rowicki	
1961	David Oistrakh	Warsaw Philharmonic Orchestra	Karol Stryja	
1979	Konstanty Kulka	Polish National Radio Symphony Orchestra	Jerzy Maksymiuk	Recorded alongside Szymanowski's Second Violin Concerto.
1989	Christiane Edinger	Polish National Radio Symphony Orchestra	Krzysztof Penderecki	
1993	Chantal Julliet	Montréal Symphony Orchestra	Charles Dutoit	Recorded alongside Szymanowski's Second Violin Concerto.
1995	Thomas Zehetmair	City of Birmingham Symphony Orchestra	Sir Simon Rattle	Recorded alongside Szymanowski's Second Violin Concerto.
1996	Lydia Mordkovitch	BBC Philharmonic Orchestra	Vassili Sinaisky	Recorded alongside Szymanowski's Second Violin Concerto.
2000	Kaja Danczowska	Warsaw Philharmonic Orchestra	Kazimierz Kord	
2005	Nicola Benedetti	London Symphony Orchestra	Daniel Harding	
2009	Christian Tetzlaff	Vienna Philharmonic	Pierre Boulez	
2009	Frank Peter Zimmermann	Warsaw Philharmonic Orchestra	Antoni Wit	Recorded alongside Szymanowski's Second Violin Concerto.
2009	Arabella Steinbacher	Berlin Radio Symphony Orchestra	Marek Janowski	
2014	Baiba Skride	Oslo Philharmonic	Vasily Petrenko	Recorded alongside Szymanowski's Second Violin Concerto.
2017	Tasmin Little	BBC Symphony Orchestra	Edward Gardner	Recorded alongside Szymanowski's Second Violin Concerto.
2022	Lisa Batiashvili	Philadelphia Orchestra	Yannick Nézet-Seguin	
