= Symphony No. 1 (Szymanowski) =

1906-1907 symphony by Karol Szymanowski

Polish composer Karol Szymanowski worked on his Symphony No. 1 in F minor, Op. 15 between 1906 and 1907.

Szymanowski struggled with the composition. He wrote in a letter from 1906 that it was going to "turn out to be some sort of contrapuntal-harmonic-orchestral monster" and going so far as to say "I don't like it". He only completed the first movement and the finale and these two movements had a single performance at the Warsaw Philharmonia, conducted by Grzegorz Fitelberg on 26 March 1909, before Szymanowski withdrew the score.

The symphony is scored for 3 flutes, 3 oboes, 4 clarinets, 3 bassoons, 6 horns, 3 trumpets, 3 trombones, tuba, percussion (4 players), 2 harps and strings.

The two movements are:

1. Allegro moderato
2. Allegretto con moto grazioso

The playing time is approximately 20 minutes.

== Recordings ==
- Chandos – BBC Symphony Orchestra, conducted by Edward Gardner
- LSO Live – London Symphony Orchestra, conducted by Valery Gergiev
- Naxos – Polish State Philharmonic Orchestra (Katowice), conducted by Karol Stryja
- Naxos – Warsaw Philharmonic Orchestra, conducted by Antoni Wit
