= Paul Kochanski =

Polish violinist, composer and arranger (1887–1934)

Paul Kochanski Paweł Kochański
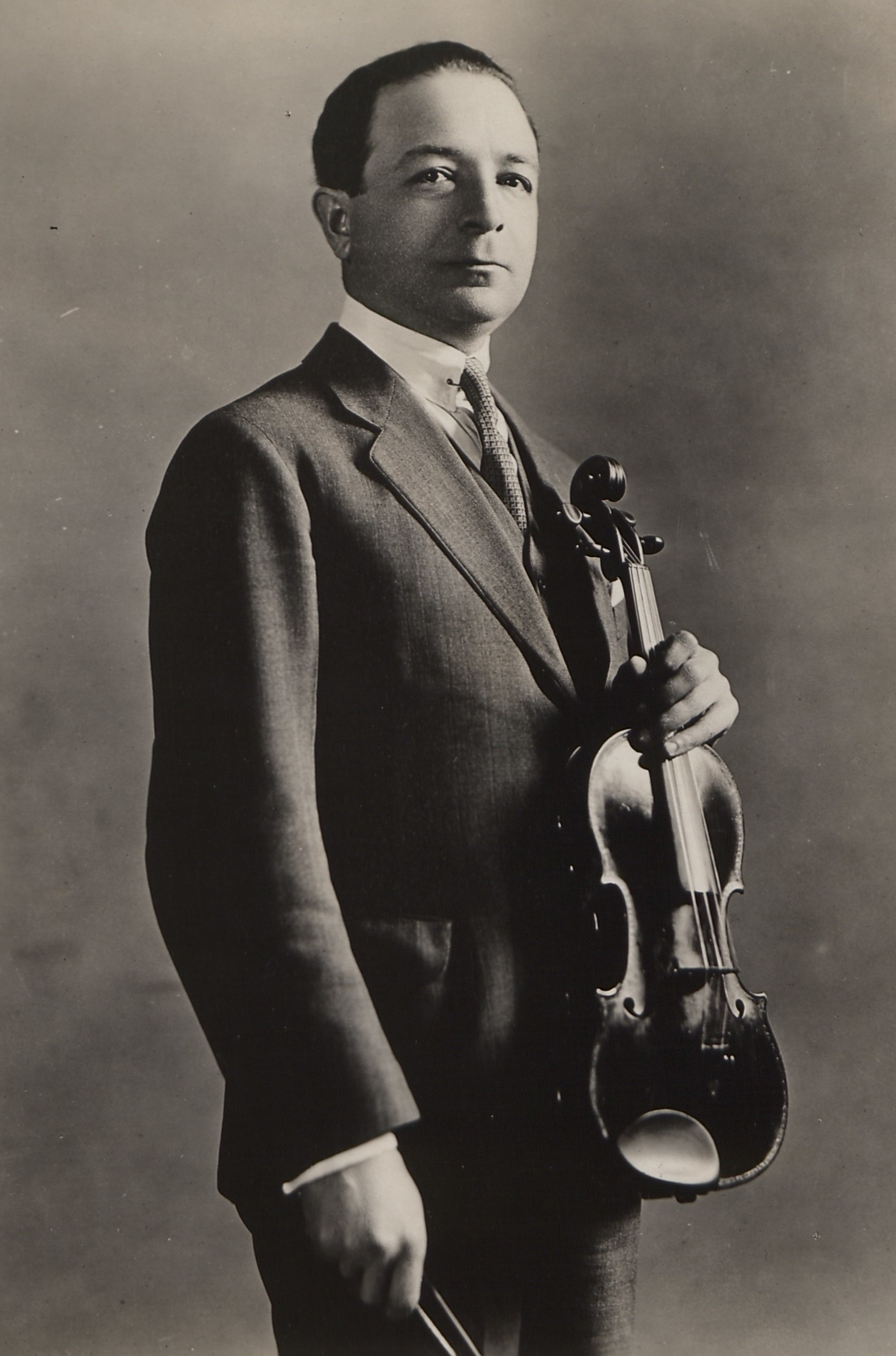
- Kochański in 1921

Background information
- Born: Fajwel Kahan; 30 August 1887; Odesa
- Died: 12 January 1934 (aged 46) New York City
- Genres: Classical
- Occupations: Musician, composer, arranger
- Instrument: Violin
- Years active: 1907–1934
- Spouse: Zosia Kohn (m. 1911)

Paul Kochanski (Polish: Paweł Kochański; born Fajwel Kahan; 30 August 1887 – 12 January 1934) was a Polish violinist, composer and arranger active in the United States.

== Training and early career ==
Paweł Kochański was born into a Jewish family in Odessa as Fajwel Kahan (Kaganov, Kaganoff), the son of Joshua Kahan, a synagogue cantor and violin teacher, and Chana Smoljenicka. He studied violin first with his father and then at age 7 with Emil Młynarski, whose teacher had been Leopold Auer. Młynarski also took charge of his upbringing and education, treating him like a son and stating that he believed he would become a world-class soloist.

Młynarski took him with him to Warsaw, where he assumed the post of second conductor at the Opera of the Grand Theatre. Kahan performed there under the artistic pseudonym “Kochański”; he made his stage debut in 1899 at the Grand Theatre, performing, among other works, Henryk Wieniawski’s Violin Concerto in D minor. At the Warsaw Philharmonic, opened in 1901, Kochański performed alongside Jan Buchtele, also appearing as a soloist. Kochański adopted the name Paweł at his baptism in 1902 in Iłgów. In 1912 he formally legalised his new name. In 1903, with sponsorship from leading Warsaw families arranged by Młynarski, Kochanski went to Brussels to study with César Thomson at the Brussels Conservatoire. There, after four months, he received the Premier prix avec la plus grande distinction (First prize, with the greatest distinction).

It was at this point, as he was beginning his itinerant virtuoso career, that he met Arthur Rubinstein, through the invitation of Juliusz Wertheim. They immediately realised their shared musical sympathies, but the friendship, rich with youthful energy, really took off in 1907 with their concerts for the Warsaw Philharmonic, including duo performances of Beethoven's Kreutzer Sonata and Tchaikovsky's Piano Trio with the cellist J. Sabelik. In 1908, with Jozef Jaroszyński (a patron of Kochanski's), they made a triumphant tour of European capitals, including Berlin, Paris, London and Karlsbad, and in 1908–9 Kochanski and Rubinstein performed the Franck Violin Sonata in A, the Kreutzer again, and a Brahms trio (with Eli Kochański, a cellist and Paul's gifted brother) for the Warsaw Philharmonic.

== Pre-war career ==
From 1909 to 1911 Kochanski taught at the Warsaw Conservatory as professor of violin. In 1909 he and Rubinstein gave the first performance of Karol Szymanowski's Violin Sonata in D minor. Their participation, with their friend Szymanowski, in the movement known as Young Poland, helped to promote more progressive musical attitudes in Warsaw. In 1911, Kochanski married Zosia Kohn (who had previously held a hopeless passion for Juliusz Wertheim). His father-in-law, a lawyer, bought him a Stradivarius violin for his wedding present. Szymanowski dedicated his Violin Concerto No. 1 in 1916 to Kochanski, who contributed the cadenza.

In 1913–1914 in London, Rubinstein introduced Kochanski to the music room of Paul and Muriel Draper, to which they also introduced Szymanowski, and where Paul met Igor Stravinsky. In this circle they were often with Pablo Casals, Jacques Thibaud, Lionel Tertis, Pierre Monteux and others. Stravinsky dedicated a transcription for violin and piano of three pieces from The Firebird to Kochanski, who participated in two of Rubinstein's recitals at Bechstein Hall in 1914, one of which was devoted entirely to contemporary music.

In 1916 he succeeded Leopold Auer, teaching at the St. Petersburg Conservatory until 1918; during that time he became friends with Sergei Prokofiev and gave the composer some assistance on matters of technique for the solo part of his Violin Concerto No. 1 in D major. He moved on to teach at the Kiev Conservatory from 1918 to 1920. In January 1920, he premiered Szymanowski's Nocturne and Tarantella in Warsaw.

== London and New York, 1920–1934 ==
In 1920 he lived briefly in London, and gave a joint recital with Rubinstein at Wigmore Hall. In London they were reunited with Szymanowski, with whom Paul and Zosia also spent time in Brighton. Kochanski and Szymanowski gave a joint recital at Wigmore Hall in January 1921, and a few weeks later the four set off for New York City where Paul Draper and George Engels (Kochanski's American manager) were awaiting them. They were rapidly received into musical circles, Kochanski and Rubinstein giving the world premiere of Ernest Bloch's Violin Sonata No. 1 soon afterwards. Kochanski made a sensational debut in the Brahms Violin Concerto at Carnegie Hall, and was immediately in demand. The four returned to England, but went back to New York in autumn 1921. In April 1922, Kochanski played in Buenos Aires.

From this point on, Kochanski's career was based in New York. He taught at the Juilliard School from 1924, heading the violin faculty until his death of cancer at age 46 in 1934. In 1933, when he was already dying, he helped Szymanowski complete his Second Violin Concerto and gave the premiere; when published (after Kochanski's death), the score bore a dedication to him. A non-religious ceremony was held at the school, attended by 1,500 people; his pallbearers included Arturo Toscanini, Frank Damrosch, Walter Damrosch, Jascha Heifetz, Vladimir Horowitz, Fritz Kreisler, Serge Koussevitzky, Leopold Stokowski and Efrem Zimbalist.

According to Rubinstein, who loved him as his dearest friend, Kochanski enjoyed conversations with straightforward people, played cards and sometimes spoke roughly. He could be abrupt, impatient or rude, and could even get angry and walk out, slamming doors behind him.

He died intestate, leaving $20,000.

== Accolade ==
Dr. John Erskin, the dean of the Juilliard School, said of him: "Magnificent as his [Kochanski's] playing and teaching were, I think he was a bigger man than we had yet realized. His influence and his fame were only beginning. Had he lived, I believe he would have distinguished himself in composition, to which his attention was turning."

== Manuscript collection ==
The Music Department of Poland's National Library in Warsaw contains the Paweł Kochański Manuscript Collection. The Polish Ministry of Culture and National Heritage funded the purchase of his written creative work from Sotheby's, New York in December 1988 for the Library.
