= Hafez =

Persian poet and mystic (1325–1390)

Hafez حافظ
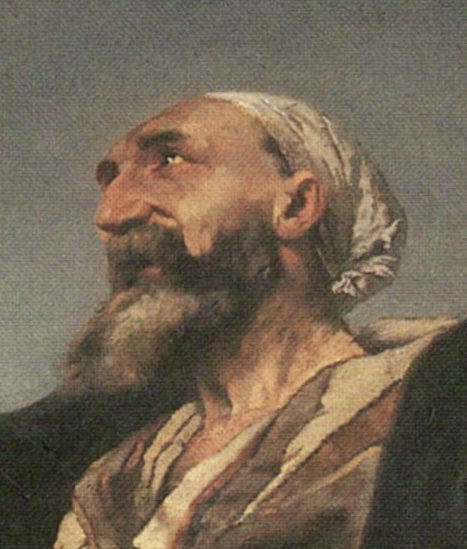
- Posthumous portrait of Hafez by Anselm Feuerbach, 1852
- Born: Khajeh Shams-od-Din Mohammad Hafez Shirazi c. 1325; Shiraz, Muzaffarid Iran
- Died: 1390 (aged 64–65); Shiraz, Timurid Iran
- Resting place: Tomb of Hafez, Shiraz, Iran
- Occupation: Poet
- Writing career
- Language: Persian; Arabic
- Genres: Mystic poetry (Ghazal, Irfan) Spiritual poet, mystic
- Notable work: The Divân of Hafez

Khajeh Shams-od-Din Mohammad Hafez Shirazi (Note: (Persian: خواجه شمس‌‌الدین محمد حافظ شیرازی), also known by his nickname lesân-al-ḡayb ('the tongue of the unseen'),) (1325–1390), also known by his pen name Hafez, (Note: حافظ, Ḥâfeẓ lit. 'the memorizer' or 'the keeper') was a Persian lyric poet whose collected works are regarded by many Iranians as one of the highest pinnacles of Persian literature. His works are often found in the homes of Persian speakers, who learn his poems by heart and use them as everyday proverbs and sayings. His life and poems have become the subjects of much analysis, commentary, and interpretation, influencing post-14th century Persian writing more than any other Persian author. He is also known by his sobriquet Lisan al-Ghayb (Tongue of the Unseen).

Hafez is best known for his Divân, a collection of his surviving poems probably compiled after his death. His works can be described as "antinomian" and with the medieval use of the term "theosophical"; the term "theosophy" in the 13th and 14th centuries was used to indicate mystical work by "authors only inspired by the Islamic holy books" (as distinguished from theology). Hafez primarily wrote in the literary genre of lyric poetry or ghazals, which is the ideal style for expressing the ecstasy of divine inspiration in the mystical form of love poems. He was a Sufi.

Themes of his ghazals include the beloved, faith and exposing hypocrisy. In his ghazals, he deals with love, wine and taverns, all presenting religious ecstasy and freedom from restraint, whether in actual worldly release or in the voice of the lover. His influence on Persian speakers appears in divination by his poems (Persian: فال حافظ, romanized: fâl-e hâfez, somewhat similar to the Roman tradition of Sortes Vergilianae) and in the frequent use of his poems in Persian traditional music, visual art and Persian calligraphy. His tomb is located in his birthplace of Shiraz and is regularly visited by locals. Adaptations, imitations, and translations of his poems exist in all major languages.

== Life ==
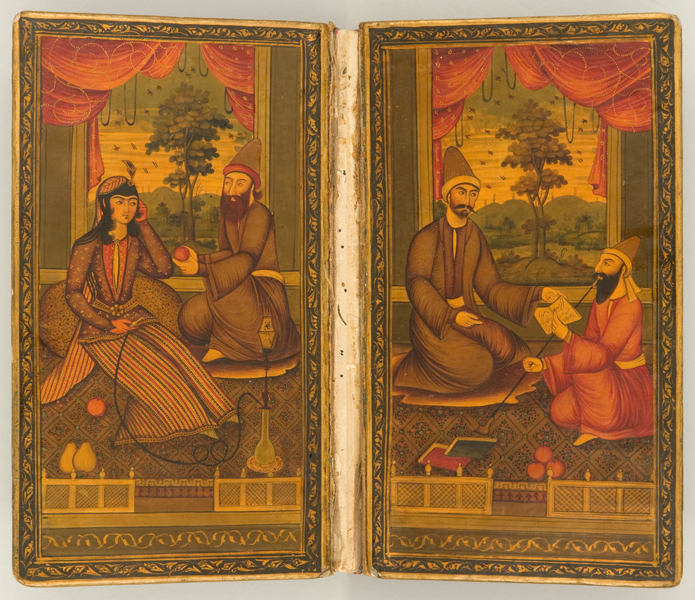
Doublures inside a 19th-century copy of the Divān of Hafez. The front doublure shows Hafez offering his work to a patron.

Khājeh Shams-od-Dīn Moḥammad Ḥāfeẓ-e Shīrāzī was born in Shiraz, and identified as a Sufi Muslim. Few details of his life are known and accounts of his early life rely upon traditional anecdotes. Early tazkiras (biographical sketches) mentioning Hafez are generally considered unreliable. At an early age, he memorized the Quran. He was given the title of Hafez because of this, which he later used as his pen name. The preface of his Divān, in which his early life is discussed, was written by an unknown contemporary whose name may have been Moḥammad Golandām. Two of the most highly regarded modern editions of Hafez's Divān are compiled by Allame Mohammad Qazvini and Qāsem Ghani (495 ghazals) and by Parviz Natel-Khanlari (486 ghazals).

Modern scholars generally agree that he was born either in 1315 or 1317, although Gulfishan Khan suggests he was born in 1320. According to an account by Jami, Hafez died in 1390. He was supported by patronage from several successive local regimes: Shah Abu Ishaq, who came to power while Hafez was in his teens; Timur at the end of his life; and even the strict ruler Shah Mubariz ud-Din Muhammad (Mubariz Muzaffar). Though his work flourished most under the 27-year rule of Jalal ud-Din Shah Shuja (Shah Shuja), it is claimed Hāfez briefly fell out of favor with Shah Shuja for mocking inferior poets (Shah Shuja wrote poetry himself and may have taken the comments personally), forcing Hāfez to flee from Shiraz to Isfahan and Yazd, however, no historical evidence to corroborate this is available. Hafez also exchanged letters and poetry with Ghiyasuddin Azam Shah, the Sultan of Bengal, who invited him to Sonargaon though he could not make it. Hafez was also a contemporary of the famous Sunni Shaf'iite theologian Adud al-Din al-Iji — whom he praised as one of the five notables of Fars.

Twenty years after his death, a tomb was erected to honor Hafez in the Musalla Gardens in Shiraz. The current mausoleum was designed by André Godard, a French archeologist and architect, in the late 1930s, and the tomb is raised on a dais amidst rose gardens, water channels, and orange trees. Inside, Hafez's alabaster sarcophagus bears the inscription of two of his poems.

== Legends ==
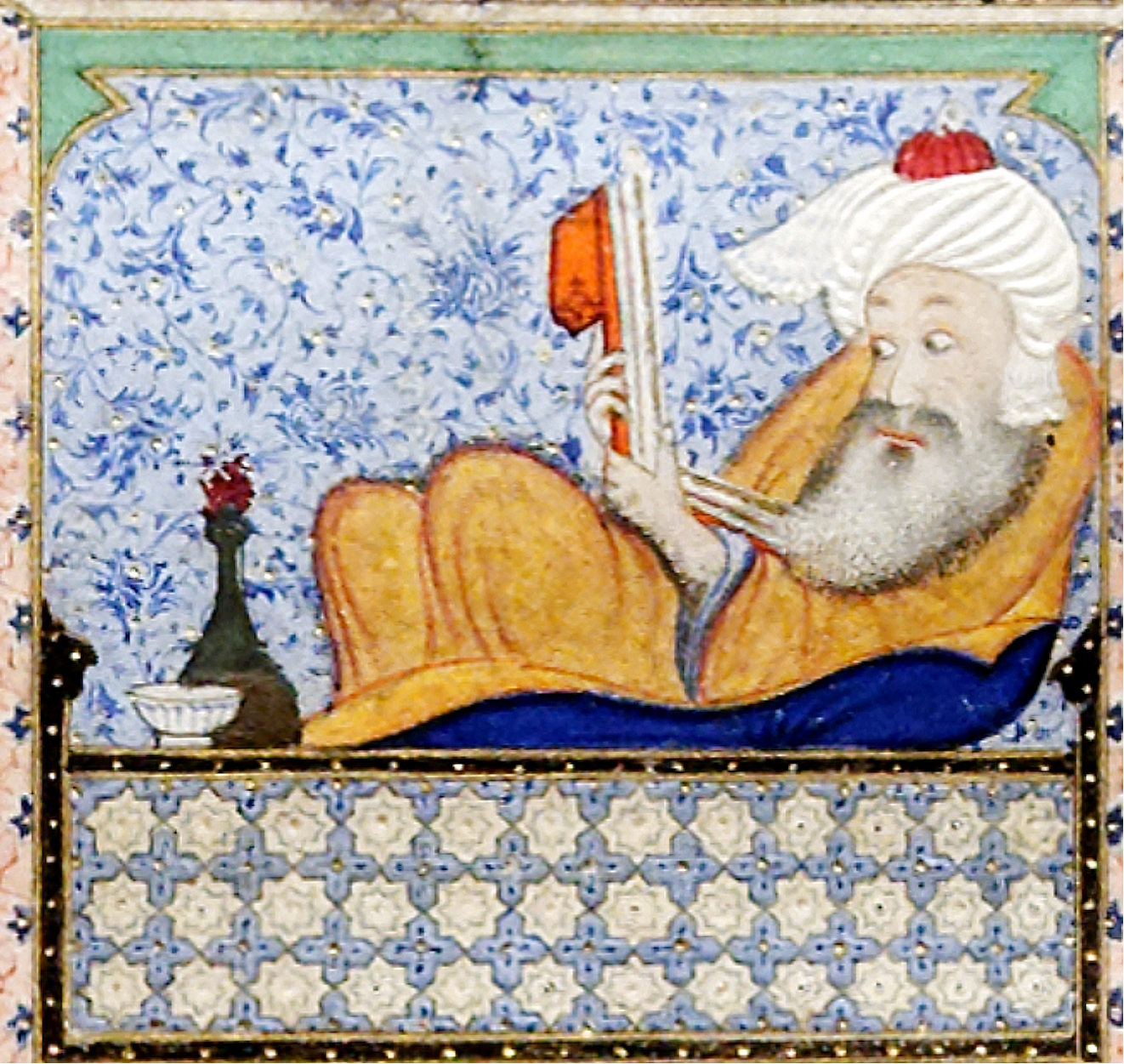
Depiction of Hafiz reading a book, painted by Sultan Mohammed circa 1531. Allegory of drunkenness (detail), in the Cartier Hafiz.

Many semi-miraculous mythical tales were woven around Hafez after his death. It is said that by listening to his father's recitations, Hafez had accomplished the task of learning the Quran by heart at an early age (that is the meaning of the word Hafez). At the same time, he is said to have known by heart the works of Rumi, Saadi, Attar Neyshapuri, and Nizami Ganjavi.

According to one tradition, before meeting his self-chosen Sufi master Hajji Zayn al-Attar, Hafez had been working in a bakery, delivering bread to a wealthy quarter of the town. There, he first saw Shakh-e Nabat, a woman of great beauty, to whom some of his poems are addressed. Ravished by her beauty but knowing that his love for her would not be requited, he allegedly held his first mystic vigil in his desire to realize this union. Still, he encountered a being of surpassing beauty who identified himself as an angel, and his further attempts at union became mystic; a pursuit of spiritual union with the divine.

At 60, he is said to have begun a chilla-nashini, a 40-day-and-night vigil by sitting in a circle that he had drawn for himself. On the 40th day, he once again met with Zayn al-Attar on what is known to be their fortieth anniversary and was offered a cup of Shirazi wine. It was there where he is said to have attained "Cosmic Consciousness". He hints at this episode in one of his verses in which he advises the reader to attain "clarity of wine" by letting it "sit for 40 days".

In one tale, Timur angrily summoned Hafez to account for one of his verses:

'agar 'ān Tork-e Šīrāzī * be dast ārad del-ē mā-rā
be khāl-ē Hendu-yaš baxšam * Samarqand ō Boxārā-rā

If that Shirazi Turk accepts my heart in their hand,
for their Indian mole I will give Samarkand and Bukhara.

Samarkand was Timur's capital and Bukhara was the kingdom's finest city. "With the blows of my lustrous sword", Timur complained, "I have subjugated most of the habitable globe... to embellish Samarkand and Bokhara, the seats of my government; and you would sell them for the black mole of some girl in Shiraz!"

Hafez, the tale goes, bowed deeply and replied, "Alas, O Prince, it is this prodigality which is the cause of the misery in which you find me". So surprised and pleased was Timur with this response that he dismissed Hafez with handsome gifts.

== Influence ==
=== Intellectual and artistic legacy ===
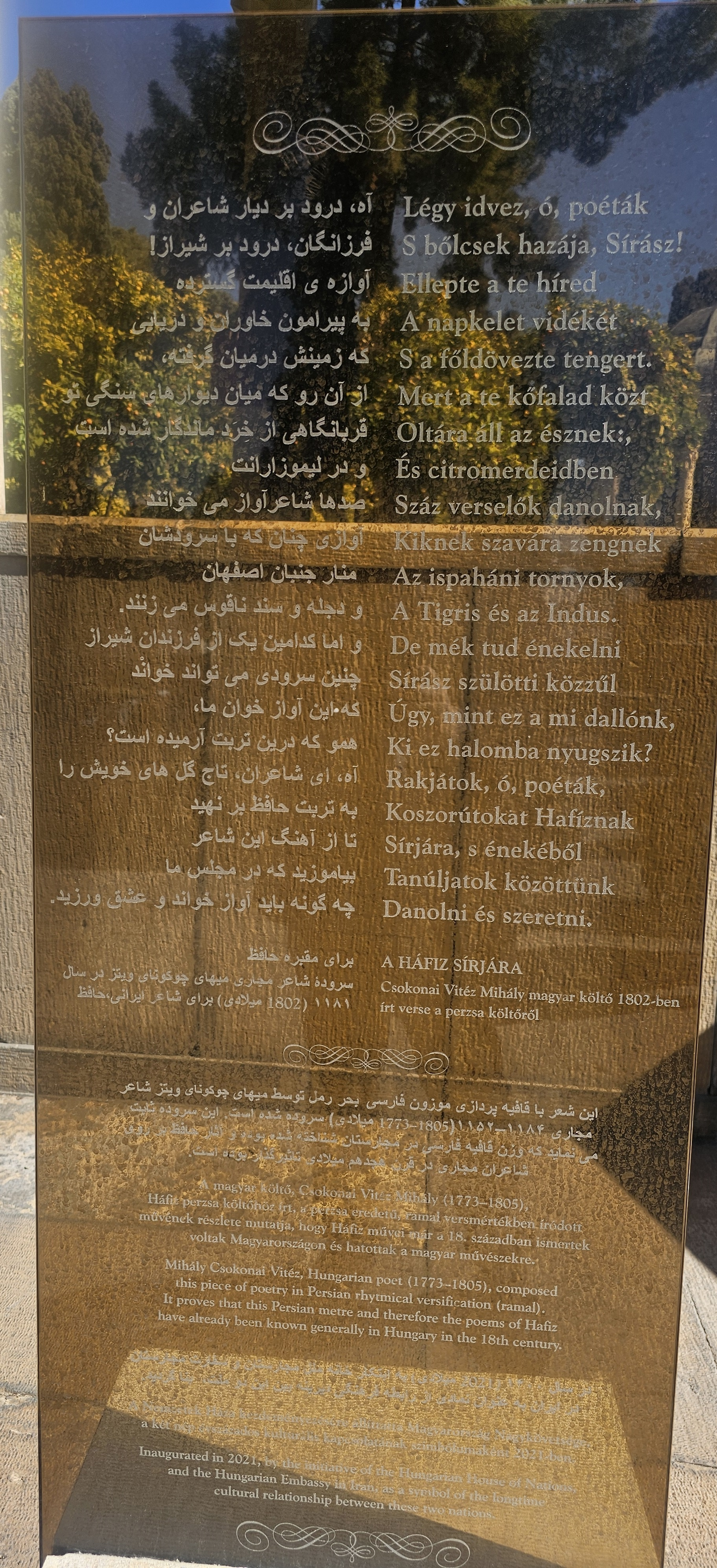
Mihály Csokonai, a Hungarian poet, composed this piece of poetry in Persian rhythmical versification (ramal). It proves that this Persian metre and therefore the poems of Hafez have already been known generally in Hungary in the 18th century.

Hafez was acclaimed throughout the Islamic world during his lifetime, with other Persian poets imitating his work, and offers of patronage from Baghdad to India.

European scholars began to translate Hafez's work from the 17th Century. The earliest translation of Hafez's poetic compositions is by Francois de Mesgnien Meninski who was the first court interpreter for the government of the Ottoman Empire, or Ottoman Porte. Thomas Hyde, Laudian Professor of Arabic at the University of Oxford translated Hafez's work into Latin in around 1690, according to Gulfishan Khan. Hyde taught himself Persian and translated the work with the assistance of a Turkish commentary.

His work was first translated into English in 1771 by William Jones. It would leave a mark on such Western writers as Thoreau, Goethe, W. B. Yeats, in his prose anthology book of essays, Discoveries, as well as gaining a positive reception within West Bengal, in India, among some of the most prolific religious leaders and poets in this province, Debendranath Tagore, Rabindranath Tagore's father, who knew Persian and used to recite from Hafez's Divans and in this line, Gurudev himself, who, during his visit to Persia in 1932, also made a homage visit to Hafez's tomb in Shiraz and Ralph Waldo Emerson (the last referred to him as "a poet's poet"). Sir Arthur Conan Doyle has his character Sherlock Holmes state that "there is as much sense in Hafiz as in Horace, and as much knowledge of the world" (in A Case of Identity). Friedrich Engels mentioned him in an 1853 letter to Karl Marx. Elias John Winkinson Gibb dedicates a 'Villanelle to Hafiz' in his 1902 work Verses and Translations and Reynold Alleyen Nicholson, in 1911, dedicates a poem titled 'Hafiz' in his publication The Don and the Dervish.

There is no definitive version of his collected works (or Dīvān); editions vary from 573 to 994 poems. Only since the 1940s has a sustained scholarly attempt (by Mas'ud Farzad, Qasim Ghani and others in Iran) been made to authenticate his work and to remove errors introduced by later copyists and censors. However, the reliability of such work has been questioned, and in the words of Hāfez scholar Iraj Bashiri, "there remains little hope from there (i.e., Iran) for an authenticated diwan".

=== In contemporary Iranian culture ===
Hafez is the most popular poet in Iran. His works can be found in almost every Iranian home. In fact, October 12 is celebrated as Hafez Day in Iran.

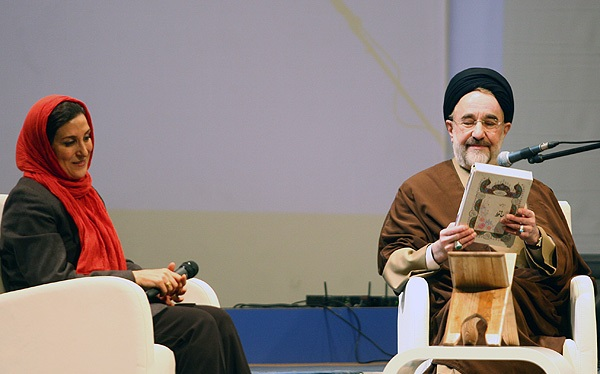
President Mohammad Khatami with actress Fatemeh Motamed-Aria in 2007 Yalda night use Divan of Hafez for fortune telling.

His tomb is "crowded with devotees" who visit the site and the atmosphere is "festive" with visitors singing and reciting their favorite Hafez poems.

Many Iranians use Divan of Hafez for bibliomancy. Iranian families usually have a Divan in their house, and when they get together during the Nowruz or Yaldā Night, they open it to a random page and read the poem on it, which they believe to be an indication of things that will happen in the future.

=== In Iranian music ===
In the genre of Persian traditional music, Hafez, along with Saadi Shirazi, have been the most popular poets in the art of āvāz, non-metered form of singing. Also the form 'Sāqi-Nāmeh' in the radif of Persian music is based on the same title by Hafez. A number of contemporary composers such as Parviz Meshkatian (Sheydaie), Hossein Alizadeh (Ahu-ye Vahshi), Mohammad Reza Lotfi (Golestān), and Siamak Aghaie (Yād Bād) have composed metric songs (tasnif) based on ghazals of Hafez which have become very popular in the genre of classical music. Hayedeh performed the song "Padeshah-e Khooban", with music by Farid Zoland. The Ottoman composer Buhurizade Mustafa Itri composed his magnum opus Neva Kâr based upon one of Hafez's poems. The Polish composer Karol Szymanowski composed The Love Songs of Hafiz based upon a German translation of Hafez poems.

=== In Afghan music ===
Many Afghan singers, including Ahmad Zahir and Abdul Rahim Sarban, have composed songs such as "Ay Padeshah-e Khooban", "Gar-Zulfe Parayshanat".

== Interpretation ==
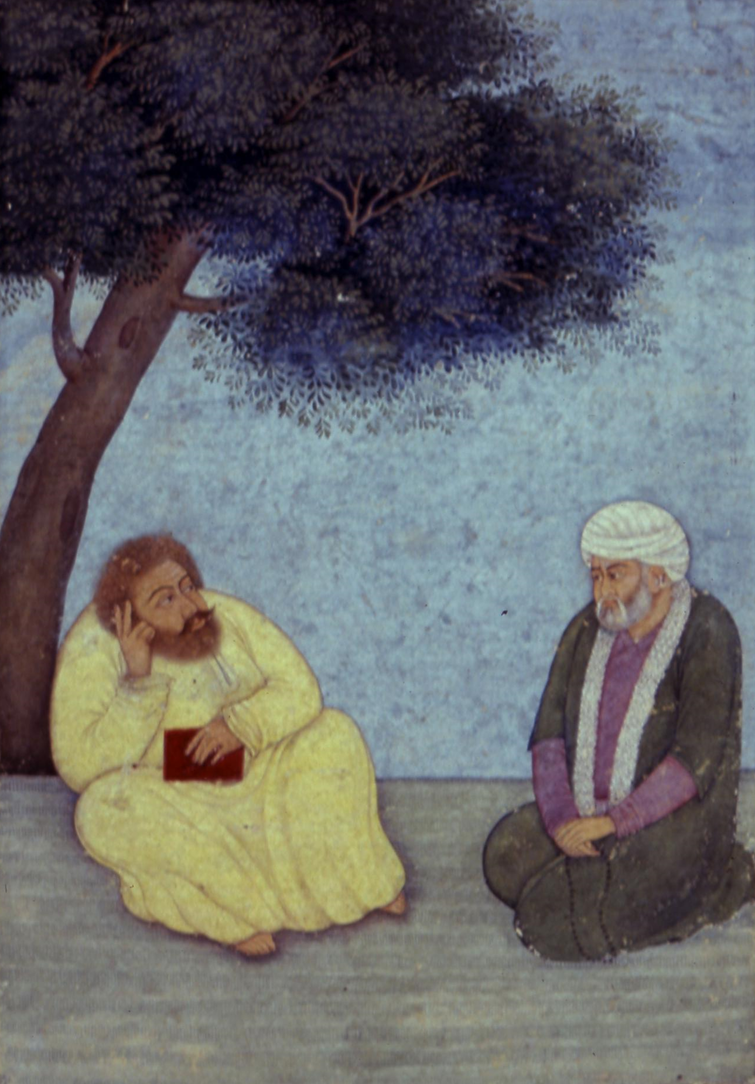
Hafez (left) in a conversation with Abu Ishaq Indjou (right). Painting on Paper in Mughal style, 18th century

The question of whether his work is to be interpreted literally, mystically, or both has been a source of contention among western scholars. On the one hand, some of his early readers such as William Jones saw in him a conventional lyricist similar to European love poets such as Petrarch. Others scholars such as Henry Wilberforce Clarke saw him as purely a poet of didactic, ecstatic mysticism in the manner of Rumi, a view that a minority of twentieth century critics and literary historians have come to challenge. Ralph Waldo Emerson rejected the Sufistic view of wine in Hafez's poems.

This confusion stems from the fact that, early in Persian literary history, the poetic vocabulary was usurped by mystics, who believed that the ineffable could be better approached in poetry than in prose. In composing poems of mystic content, they imbued every word and image with mystical undertones, causing mysticism and lyricism to converge into a single tradition. As a result, no fourteenth-century Persian poet could write a lyrical poem without having a flavor of mysticism forced on it by the poetic vocabulary itself. While some poets, such as Ubayd Zakani, attempted to distance themselves from this fused mystical-lyrical tradition by writing satires, Hafez embraced the fusion and thrived on it. Wheeler Thackston has said of this that Hafez "sang a rare blend of human and mystic love so balanced... that it is impossible to separate one from the other".

For reasons such as that, the history of the translation of Hāfez is fraught with complications, and few translations into western languages have been wholly successful.

One of the figurative gestures for which he is most famous (and which is among the most difficult to translate) is īhām or artful punning. Thus, a word such as gowhar, which could mean both "essence, truth" and "pearl", would take on both meanings at once as in a phrase such as "a pearl/essential truth outside the shell of superficial existence".

Hafez often took advantage of the aforementioned lack of distinction between lyrical, mystical, and panegyric writing by using highly intellectualized, elaborate metaphors and images to suggest multiple possible meanings. For example, a couplet from one of Hafez's poems reads:

Last night, from the cypress branch, the nightingale sang,
In Old Persian tones, the lesson of spiritual stations.

The cypress tree is a symbol both of the beloved and of a regal presence; the nightingale and birdsong evoke the traditional setting for human love. The "lessons of spiritual stations" suggest, obviously, a mystical undertone as well (though the word for "spiritual" could also be translated as "intrinsically meaningful"). Therefore, the words could signify at once a prince addressing his devoted followers, a lover courting a beloved, and the reception of spiritual wisdom.

== Satire, religion, and politics ==
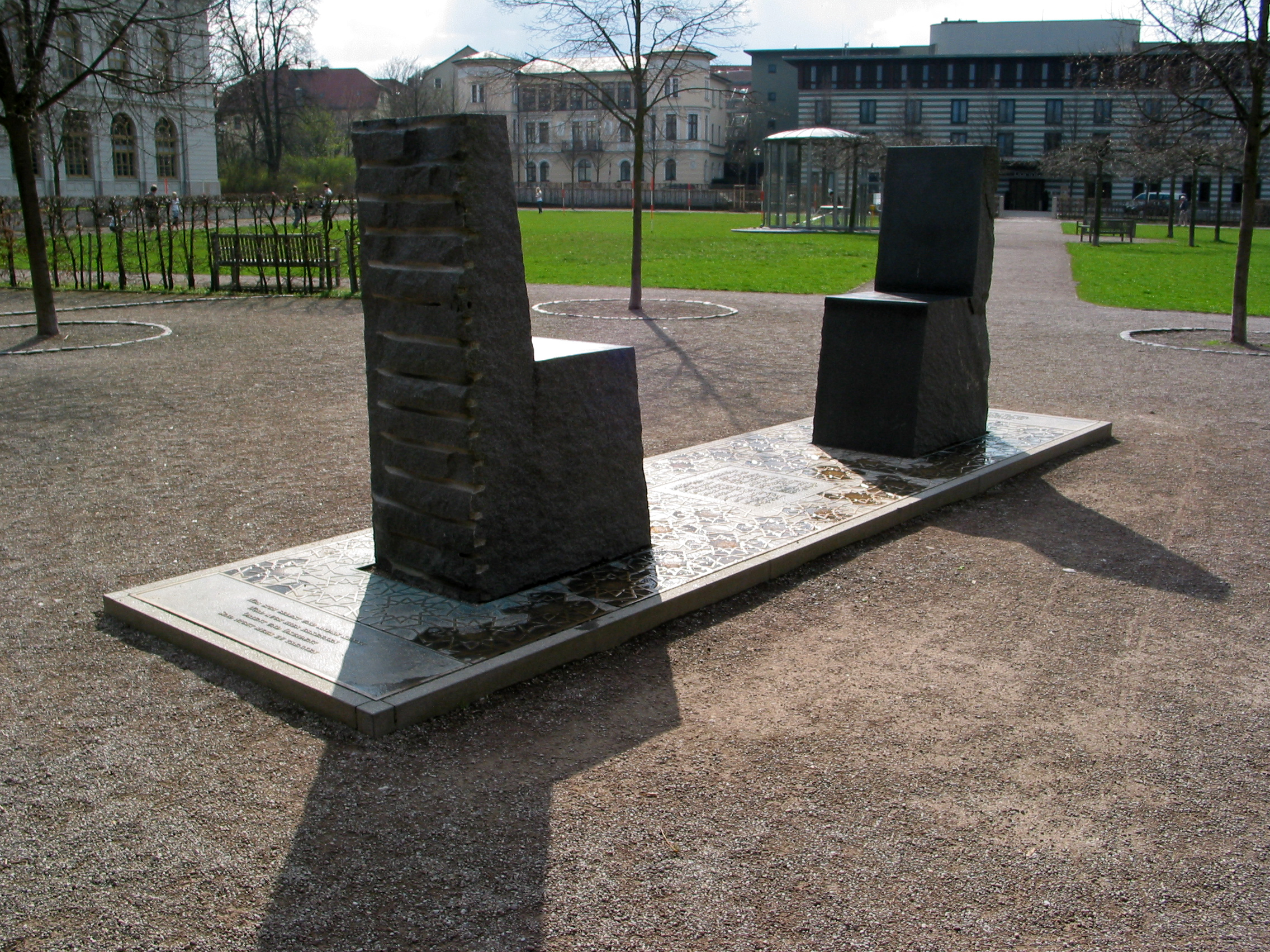
Hafez-Goethe monument in Weimar, Germany

Though Hafez is well known for his poetry, he is less commonly recognized for his intellectual and political contributions. A defining feature of Hafez' poetry is its ironic tone and the theme of hypocrisy, widely believed to be a critique of the religious and ruling establishments of the time. Persian satire developed during the 14th century, within the courts of the Mongol Empire. In this period, Hafez and other notable early satirists, such as Ubayd Zakani, produced a body of work that has since become a template for the use of satire as a political device. Many of his critiques are believed to be targeted at the rule of Mubariz al-Din Muhammad, specifically, towards the disintegration of important public and private institutions.

His work, particularly his imaginative references to monasteries, convents, Shahneh, and muhtasib, ignored the religious taboos of his period, and he found humor in some of his society's religious doctrines. Employing humor polemically has since become a common practice in Iranian public discourse and satire is now perhaps the de facto language of Iranian social commentary. Hafez was influenced by ancient Iran and Zoroastrian religion, and the terminology of this religion has been consistently used in his poems. Examples are "Mogh", "Mogh-bache", "Jamshid" etc.

== Modern English editions ==
A standard modern English edition of Hafez is Faces of Love (2012) translated by Dick Davis for Penguin Classics. Beloved: 81 poems from Hafez (Bloodaxe Books, 2018) translated by Mario Petrucci, is a recent English selection, noted by Fatemeh Keshavarz (Roshan Institute for Persian studies, University of Maryland) for preserving "that audacious and multilayered richness one finds in the originals".

Peter Avery translated a complete edition of Hafez in English, The Collected Lyrics of Hafiz of Shiraz, published in 2007. It was awarded Iran's Farabi prize. Avery's translations are published with notes explaining allusions in the text and filling in what the poets would have expected their readers to know. An abridged version exists, titled Hafiz of Shiraz: Thirty Poems: An Introduction to the Sufi Master.

Certain English-language poems have been incorrectly attributed to Hafez. The American poet Daniel Ladinsky has published a number of volumes of poetry that describes its contents as "poems inspired by Hafiz" or "poems of Hafiz" or "renderings of Hafiz." Some readers have understood this to mean that they are translations of poems written by Hafiz. However, the author has acknowledged that these are original poems inspired by Hafiz and they are not translations of Hafiz poems.

== Divan-e-Hafez ==
Bangladeshi scholar Sultan Ahmad Nanupuri reciting a poem from the Divan of Hafez.

The Divān of Hafez, or simply The Divān, refers to any complete compilation of the poems of Hafez. These include his short, quatrain-length rubaiyat, his longer ghazal poems, and various other poetic formats.

There is no evidence that most of Hafez's poems were destroyed. In addition, Hafez was very famous during his lifetime. Therefore, the small number of poetic compositions we have available indicates that he was not a prolific poet.

It is likely that Hafez's Divan was compiled for the first time by Mohammad Glendam after his death. Unconfirmed reports indicate that Hafez published his court in AH 770 (1368). that is, edited more than twenty years before his death.

== Death and the tomb ==
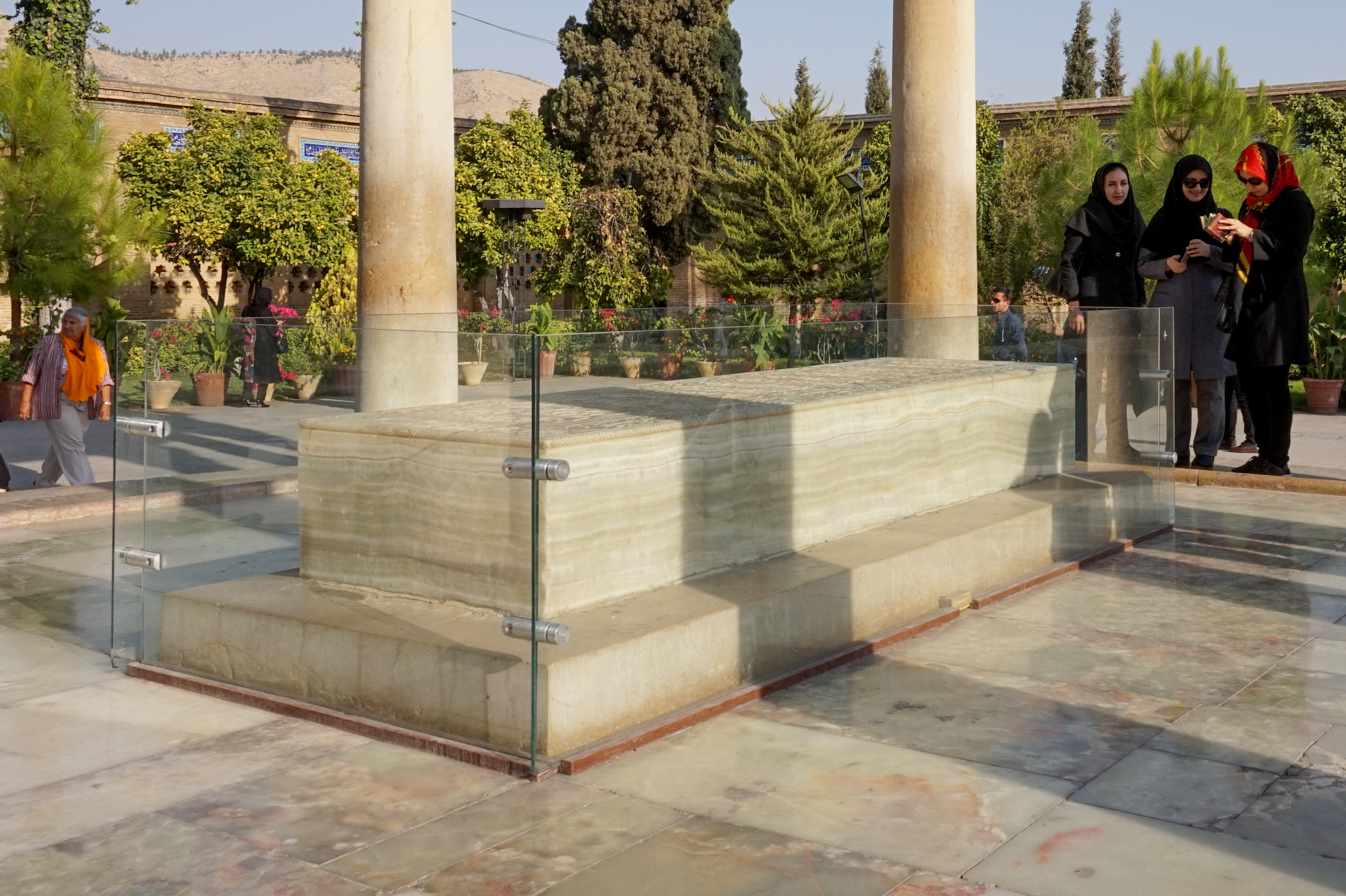
Tomb of Hafez in Shiraz

The year of Hafez's death is AH 791 (1389). Hafez was buried in the prayer hall of Shiraz called the Hafezieh. In AH 855 (1451), after the conquest of Shiraz by Abolghasem Babar Teymouri, they built a tomb under the command of his minister, Maulana Mohammad Mamaei.

== Poems by Hafez ==
The number in the edition by Muhammad Qazvini and Qasem Ghani (1941) is given, as well as that of Parviz Nātel-Khānlari (2nd ed. 1983):

- Alā yā ayyoha-s-sāqī – QG 1; PNK 1
- Dūš dīdam ke malā'ek – QG 184; PNK 179
- Goftā borūn šodī – QG 406; PNK 398
- Mazra'-ē sabz-e falak – QG 407; PNK 399
- Naqdhā rā bovad āyā – QG 185; PNK 180
- Sālhā del talab-ē jām – QG 142 (Ganjoor 143); PNK 136
- Shirazi Turk – QG 3; PNK 3
- Sīne mālāmāl – QG 470; PNK 461
- Zolf-'āšofte – QG 26; PNK 22

== See also ==
- Diwan (poetry)
- List of Persian poets and authors
- Persian metres
- Persian mysticism
  - Rumi, Persian poet
- Persian literature
- The Love Songs of Hafiz
- West-östlicher Diwan
