= Jerzy Liebert =

Polish poet (1904–1931)

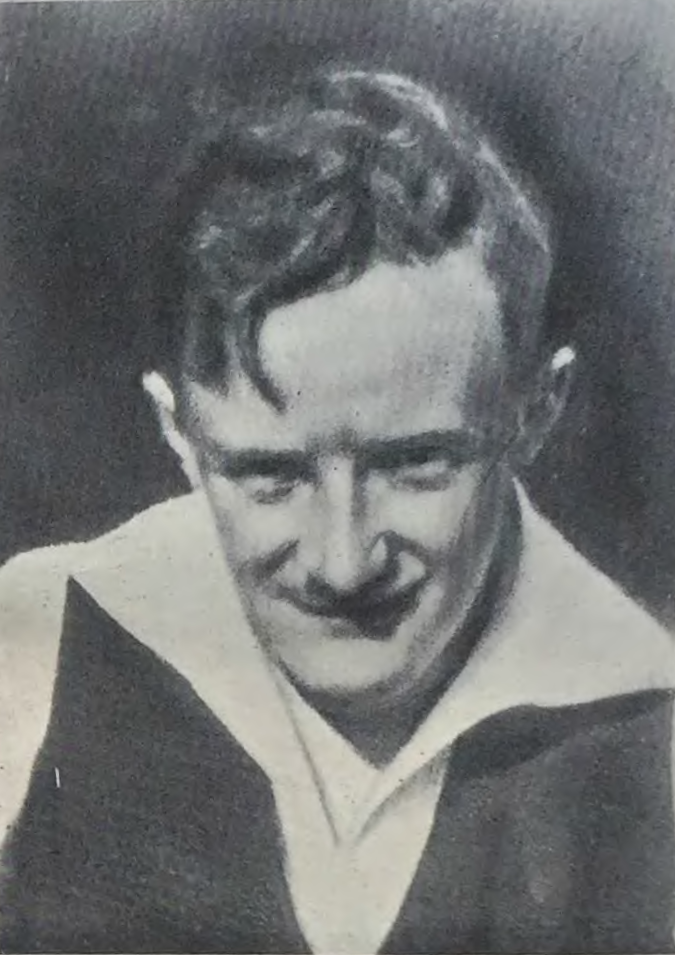
- Liebert in 1930
- Born: 24 July 1904; Częstochowa, Piotrków, Russian Empire
- Died: 19 June 1931 (aged 26); Warsaw, Poland

Jerzy Liebert (Polish pronunciation: [ˈjɛʐɨ ˈljɛbɛrt]; 24 July 1904 – 19 June 1931) was a Polish poet and author. He was born in Czestochowa, Russian Empire, and is known for his lyrical poetry that often reflected themes of nature, love, and the human condition. Liebert's poetry was influenced by symbolism and the Polish romantic tradition.

Liebert's life was short as he died at the age of 26. Despite his short life, he left behind a body of work that continues to be appreciated for its emotional depth and poetic expression. Liebert's poems have been included in various anthologies and collections of Polish literature, and his contributions to Polish poetry are remembered and celebrated by readers and scholars alike.
