= Tadeusz Miciński =

Polish poet, novelist and playwright

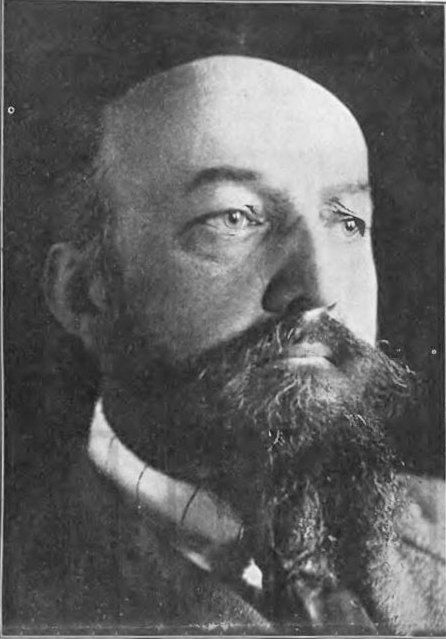
- Portrait of Tadeusz Miciński, 1913
- Born: 9 November 1873; Łódź
- Died: February 1918 (aged 44) near Czeryków
- Notable work: W mroku gwiazd; Nietota. Księga tajemna Tatr; Xiądz Faust; Wita. Powieść
- Movement: Young Poland expressionism

Tadeusz Miciński (1873-1918) was a Polish poet, novelist, and playwright associated with the Young Poland movement. Known for his mystical and symbolist themes, Miciński's works often explore the human psyche, existential questions, and the metaphysical aspects of reality.

== Early life and education ==
Tadeusz Miciński was born on November 9, 1873, in Łódź, then part of the Russian Empire. He came from a family with patriotic traditions, which influenced his later work. Miciński studied philosophy, history, and literature at the Jagiellonian University in Kraków and the University of Berlin. His academic background and interest in various philosophical currents significantly shaped his literary output.

== Literary career ==
Miciński made his literary debut in 1896 with the publication of his poetry collection W mroku gwiazd (In the Gloom of Stars). His works are marked by a fascination with mysticism, symbolism, and the exploration of the subconscious. He gained considerable recognition with his novel Nietota: Księga tajemna Tatr (Nietota: The Secret Book of the Tatras) published in 1910, blending Polish folklore with esoteric and philosophical themes.

Miciński's dramatic works, such as Kniaź Patiomkin (Prince Potemkin) and Termopile polskie (Polish Thermopylae), further demonstrate his innovative approach to literature, combining historical and mythological motifs with a modernist sensibility.

His writing often reflects his deep engagement with contemporary philosophical and spiritual movements, including Theosophy and early psychoanalysis.

== Themes and style ==
Miciński's writing is characterized by its dense symbolic imagery, elaborate language, and exploration of metaphysical themes. His works frequently delve into the mysteries of existence, the nature of good and evil, and the quest for spiritual enlightenment. Miciński's unique style and thematic concerns place him among the most distinctive voices of the Young Poland movement, drawing comparisons to other symbolist writers like Stanisław Wyspiański and Bolesław Leśmian.

== Later life and legacy ==
During World War I, Miciński became involved in the Polish independence movement. Tragically, he was murdered under mysterious circumstances on February 11, 1918, near Charków (now Kharkiv, Ukraine). Despite his untimely death, Miciński's influence on Polish literature and culture remains significant. His works continue to be studied for their rich symbolism, philosophical depth, and contribution to the development of modernist literature in Poland.

== Selected works ==
- W mroku gwiazd (In the Gloom of Stars) – 1896
- Nietota: Księga tajemna Tatr (Nietota: The Secret Book of the Tatras) – 1910
- Kniaź Patiomkin (Prince Potemkin) – 1906
- Termopile polskie (Polish Thermopylae) – 1904
- Łazarze (Lazaruses) – 1925 (posthumous)
