= Grammy Award for Best Instrumental Soloist Performance (without orchestra) =

Grammy award

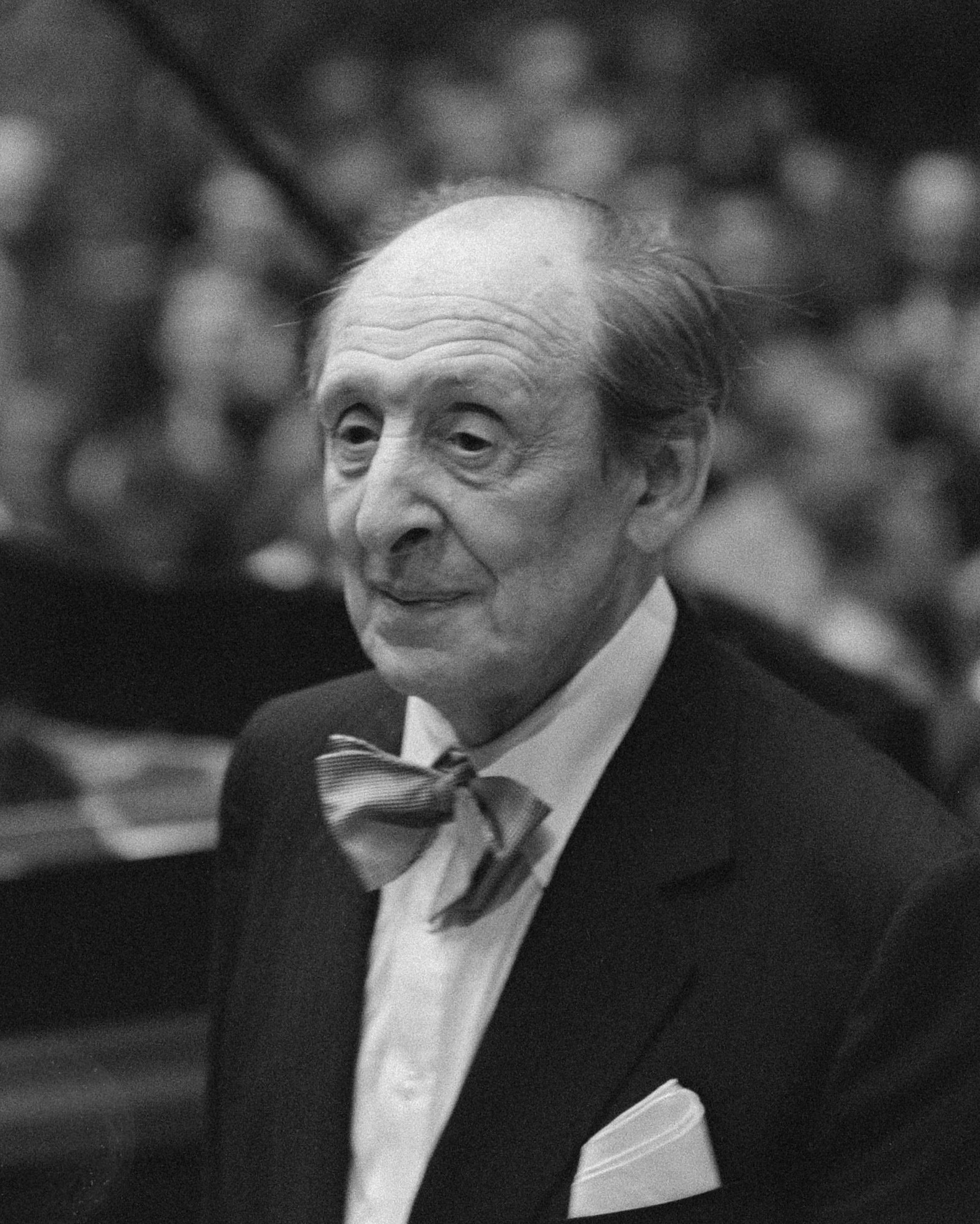
Multi-time nominee and winner Vladimir Horowitz in 1986

The Grammy Award for Best Instrumental Soloist Performance (without orchestra) was awarded from 1959 to 2011. From 1967 to 1971, and in 1987, the award was combined with the award for Best Instrumental Soloist(s) Performance (with orchestra) and awarded as the Grammy Award for Best Classical Performance – Instrumental Soloist or Soloists (with or without orchestra).

The award has had several minor name changes:

- In 1959 the award was known as Best Classical Performance – Instrumentalist (other than concerto-scale accompaniment)
- In 1960 it was awarded as Best Classical Performance – Concerto or Instrumental Soloist (other than full orchestral accompaniment)
- In 1961 it was awarded as Best Classical Performance – Instrumental Soloist or Duo (other than with orchestral accompaniment)
- From 1962 to 1964 it was awarded as Best Classical Performance – Instrumental Soloist or Duo (without orchestra)
- In 1965 it was awarded as Best Performance – Instrumental Soloist or Soloists (without orchestra)
- From 1966 to 1994 it was awarded as Best Classical Performance – Instrumental Soloist or Soloists (without orchestra) (or a very similar equivalent)
- From 1995 to the present it has been awarded as Best Instrumental Soloist Performance (without orchestra)

In 2012, the award was discontinued in a major overhaul of Grammy categories. The category was merged with the Best Instrumental Soloist(s) Performance (with orchestra) category to form the new Best Classical Instrumental Solo category, similar to the award from 1967 to 1971.

Years reflect the year in which the Grammy Awards were presented, for works released in the previous year.

== Recipients ==
Year	Winner(s)	Title	Nominees	Ref.
1959	Andrés Segovia	Segovia Golden Jubilee	Wanda Landowska for Art of the Harpsichord; Nathan Milstein for Beethoven: Sonata No. 9 and Sonata No. 8; Vladimir Horowitz for Horowitz Plays Chopin; Marcel Grandjany for Music for the Harp	
1960	Arthur Rubinstein	Beethoven: Sonatas No. 21 in C Major, Op. 53 & No. 18 in E Flat Major, Op. 53, No. 3	Nathan Milstein for 4 Italian Sonatas; Laurindo Almeida for Danzas; Leonard Pennario for Pennario Plays; Jamie Laredo for Presenting Jamie Laredo	
1961	Laurindo Almeida	The Spanish Guitars of Laurindo Almeida	Jamie Laredo for Bach: Partita for Violin No. 3 in E Major, BWV 1006.1; Paul Maynard for Brahms: Keyboard Music of the French Court; Arthur Rubinstein for Chopin: Ballades; Julian Bream for The Art of Julian Bream	
1962	Laurindo Almeida	Reverie for Spanish Guitar	Andrés Segovia for Bach: Suite No. 3 in D major, BWV 1068; Ruggerio Ricci for Bartók, Hindemith, Prokofiev: Solo Violin Sonatas; Sviatoslav Richter for Beethoven: Appassionata Sonata, Funeral March Sonata; Vladimir Horowitz for Homage to Liszt	
1963	Vladimir Horowitz	Columbia Records Presents Vladimir Horowitz	Andrés Segovia for 5 Pieces From "Platero and I"; Joseph Szigeti for Bach: The 6 Sonatas and Partitas for Violin Unaccompanied; Glenn Gould for Bach: The Art of the Fugue Vol. 1; Sviatoslav Richter for Beethoven: Sonata No. 22 for Piano; Robert and Gaby Casadesus for French Piano Music - Four Hands; Leon Goossens for The Art of Leon Goossens	
1964	Vladimir Horowitz	The Sound of Horowitz	Glenn Gould for Bach: The 6 Partitas; Rudolf Serkin for Beethoven: 3 Favourite Sonatas (Sonata No. 8 (Pathétique), No. 14 (Moonlight), & No. 23 (Appassionata)); Andrés Segovia for Granada; Arthur Rubinstein for Schumann: Carnaval Fantasiestücke	
1965	Vladimir Horowitz	Horowitz Plays Beethoven, Debussy, Chopin	Arthur Rubinstein for A French Program (Ravel, Poulenc, Fauré, Chabrier); Glenn Gould for Bach: Two and Three Part Inventions; Igor Kipnis for French Baroque Music for Harpsichord; Julian Bream for Popular Classics for Spanish Guitar; Sviatoslav Richter for Richter Plays Schubert	
1966	Vladimir Horowitz	Horowitz at Carnegie Hall - An Historic Return	Raymond Lewenthal for Alkan: Piano Music; Glenn Gould for Bach: The Well-Tempered Clavier, Book 1, Vol. 3 (17-24); Vladimir Ashkenazy for Chopin Ballades (1-4); Arthur Rubinstein for Chopin: 8 Polonaises and 4 Impromptus; Julian Bream for Julian Bream in Concert	
1972	Vladimir Horowitz	Horowitz Plays Rachmaninoff (Etudes-Tableaux Piano Music; Sonatas)	Alicia de Larrocha for Alicia de Larrocha Plays Spanish Piano Music of the 20th Century; Glenn Gould for Bach: The Well-Tempered Clavier, Book 2, Vol. 3, Preludes and Fugues 17-24; Van Cliburn for Barber: Sonata for Piano; Prokofiev: Piano Sonata No. 6 in A Major; Stephen Bishop for Bartók: Mikrokosmos, Vol. 6; Out of Doors Suite; Sonatina; Rudolf Serkin for Beethoven: Sonata No. 29 in B Flat, Op. 106 (Hammerklavier)	
1973	Vladimir Horowitz	Horowitz Plays Chopin	Rafael Puyana for Couperin: Harpsichord Pieces; Arturo Benedetti Michelangeli for Debussy: Images, Books 1 and 2; Children's Corner Suite; Rudolf Firkusny for Janáček: Piano Works (Complete); Itzhak Perlman for Paganini: The 24 Caprices; William Masselos for Schumann: Davidsbündlertänze; Brahms: Piano Sonata No. 1; Laurindo Almeida for The Art of Laurindo Almeida; Charles Rosen for Beethoven: The Late Sonatas of Beethoven	
1974	Vladimir Horowitz	Horowitz Plays Scriabin	Glenn Gould for Bach: French Suites 1-4; Sviatoslav Richter for Bach: The Well-Tempered Clavier; Maurizio Pollini for Chopin: Chopin; Virgil Fox for Heavy Organ at Carnegie Hall; Alfred Brendel for Schubert: Sonata in B Flat, Op 960; Julian Bream for The Woods So Wild	
1975	Alicia de Larrocha	Albéniz: Iberia	Glenn Gould for Bach: French Suites Vol. 2, Nos. 5 and 6; Vladimir Horowitz for Bach: The Well-Tempered Clavier; Maurizio Pollini for Beethoven: Piano Sonatas No. 21 in C Major (Waldstein) and No. 23 in F Minor (Appassionata); David Burge for Crumb: Makrokosmos; Itzhak Perlman for Perpetual Motion	
1976	Nathan Milstein	Bach: Sonatas and Partitas for Violin Unaccompanied	John Williams for Bach: Suites for Lute; Vladimir Ashkenazy for Chopin: Études, Opp. 10 and 25; Alicia de Larrocha for Falla: Music of Fallas (The Three-Cornered Hat, El amor brujo); Peter Serkin for Messiaen: 20 Regards Sur l'Enfant Jesus; Arturo Benedetti Michelangeli for Schumann: Carnaval	
1977	Vladimir Horowitz	The Horowitz Concerts 1975/76	Maurizio Pollini for Chopin: Preludes, Op. 28; Itzhak Perlman for Itzhak Perlman Plays Fritz Kreisler; Lazar Berman for Liszt: Legendary Soviet Pianist Lazar Berman Plays Liszt; Vladimir Ashkenazy for Rachmaninoff: Preludes; Alfred Brendel for Schubert: Piano Sonata in A minor, Op. 42; Hungarian Melody in B minor, (D.817); Andrés Segovia for The Intimate Guitar - 2; André Watts for Watts by George: André Watts Plays George Gershwin (Rhapsody in Blue, Preludes for Piano)	
1978	Arthur Rubinstein	Beethoven: Piano Sonata No. 18 in E Flat/Schumann: Fantasiestücke, Op. 12	Igor Kipnis for Bach: Partitas for Harpsichord No. 1 in B Flat Major and No. 2 in C minor; Glenn Gould for Bach: The English Suites (Complete); Daniel Adni for Grainger: Piano Music of Percy Grainger; Alicia de Larrocha for Granados: Goyescas; Itzhak Perlman for Itzhak Perlman Plays Fritz Kreisler: Album 2; Michel Beroff for Messiaen: 20 Regards de l'Enfant Jesus	
1979	Vladimir Horowitz	The Horowitz Concerts 77/78	Alfred Brendel for Bach: Italian Concerto; Choral Prelude;Prelude S922; Chromatic Fantasia and Fugue; Fantasy and Fugue; Maurizio Pollini for Beethoven: The Late Piano Sonatas; Charles Rosen for Beethoven: Variations on a Waltz by Diabelli; Paul Jacobs for Debussy: Preludes for Piano, Books I and II; Claudio Arrau for Liszt: 12 Transcendental Etudes and 3 Etudes de Concert; Rudolf Serkin for Rudolf Serkin of Television	
1980	Vladimir Horowitz	The Horowitz Concerts 78/79	Rosalyn Tureck for Bach: Goldberg Variations; Glenn Gould for Bach: Toccatas, Vol. 1; Maurizio Pollini for Boulez: Sonata for Piano No. 2; Paul Jacobs for Debussy: Images, Books 1 and 2; Arthur Rubinstein for Franck: Prelude Chorale and Fugue for Piano; Bach-Busoni; Chaconne; Mozart; Rondo in A minor; Ursula Oppens for Rzewski: The People United Will Never be Defeated; Igor Kipnis for Scarlatti: Sonatas (12); Julian Bream for Villa-Lobos: Etudes and Suite Populaire Brasilienne	
1981	Itzhak Perlman	The Spanish Album	Glenn Gould for Bach: Toccatas, Vol. 2; Rudolf Serkin for Brahms: Variations and Fugue on a Theme by Handel; Leo Smit for Copland: The Complete Music for Piano Solo; Joshua Rifkin for Digital Ragtime, Music of Scott Joplin; Ruth Laredo for Rachmaninoff: Music for Piano, Vol. 7 (Sonatas Nos. 1 and 2)	
1982	Vladimir Horowitz	The Horowitz Concerts 79/80	Arthur Rubinstein for Arthur Rubinstein, Schumann, Ravel, Debussy, Albeniz; Murray Perahia for Bartók: Sonata for Piano; Improvisation on Hungarian Peasant Songs; Suite; Itzhak Perlman for Itzhak Perlman Plays Fritz Kreisler, Album 3; Pinchas Zukerman for Virtuoso Violin	
1983	Glenn Gould	Bach: The Goldberg Variations	Ruth Laredo for Barber: Sonata for Piano, Op. 26; Souvenirs, Op. 28; Nocturne, Op. 33; Alicia de Larrocha for Granados: Danzas Españolas; Isao Tomita for Grofe-Tomita: Grand Canyon Suite; Anderson-Tomita: Syncopated Clock; Vladimir Horowitz for Horowitz at the Met (Scarlatti, Chopin, Liszt, Rachmaninoff); Emanuel Ax for Schumann: Humoreske, Op. 20, Fantasiestücke, Op. 12; Ronald Smith for The Alkan Project (Etudes, Op. 39, in All the Minor Keys)	
1984	Glenn Gould	Beethoven: Piano Sonatas Nos. 12 & 13	Emil Gilels for Beethoven: Piano Sonatas Piano Sonata No. 15 in D Major, Op. 28 (Pastoral) and No. 3 in C Major, Op. 2; Vladimir Horowitz for Horowitz in London; Shlomo Mintz for Paganini: Caprices (24); Ivo Pogorelich for Ravel: Gaspard de la Nuit; Prokofiev: Piano Sonata No. 6 in A Major, Op. 82	
1985	Yo-Yo Ma	Bach: The Unaccompanied Cello Suites	Emil Gilels for Beethoven: Piano Sonata No. 29 in B Flat Major, Op. 06 (Hammerklavier); Julian Bream for Music of Spain, Vol. 7: A Celebration of Andrés Segovia; Glenn Gould for R. Strauss: Glenn Gould Plays Strauss (Sonata; 5 Pieces, Op. 3); Alicia de Larrocha for Schubert: Piano Sonata in B Flat Major, D. 960	
1986	Vladimir Ashkenazy	Ravel: Gaspard de la nuit; Pavane pour une infante défunte; Valses nobles et sentimentales	Claudio Arrau for Chopin: 4 Scherzos; Polonaise-Fantaisie, Op. 61; Francois-Rene Duchable for Chopin: Piano Sonata No. 2 in B Flat Major and No. 3 in B Minor; Michael Tilson Thomas for Gershwin: Preludes for Piano; Short Story; Violin Piece for Lily Pons; Sleepless Night; Promenade; Julian Bream for Guitarra: The Guitar in Spain	
1987	No Award Given			
1988	Vladimir Horowitz	Horowitz in Moscow	András Schiff for Bach: The Well-Tempered Clavier, Book 1; Murray Perahia for Beethoven: Piano Sonatas No. 17 and No. 26, Op. 81A; Itzhak Perlman for My Favourite Kreisler; Peter Serkin for Stravinsky; Wolpe; Lieberson	
1989	Alicia de Larrocha	Albéniz: Iberia; Navarra; Suite Espagnola	Keith Jarrett for Bach: The Well-Tempered Clavier, Book 1; Alfred Brendel for Liszt: Années de pèlerinage, Second Year: Italy; Vladimir Horowitz for Mozart: Piano Sonata No. 13 in B Flat Major, K. 333; Maurizio Pollini for Schubert: The Late Piano Sonatas (D. 958, 959, 960); 3 Piano Pieces, D. 946; Allegretto, D. 915	
1990	András Schiff	Bach: The English Suites	Richard Goode for Beethoven: Beethoven's Late Piano Sonatas; Krystian Zimerman for Chopin: Four Ballades; Rudolf Firkusny for Martinů: Piano Sonata No. 1; Les Ritournelles; Fantasie et Toccata; Janos Starker for Popper: Romantic Cello Favourites	
1991	Vladimir Horowitz	The Last Recording	Ursula Oppens for Carter: Night Fantasies; Adams: Phrygian Gates; Mitsuko Uchida for Debussy: 12 Piano Études; Alicia de Larrocha for Mozart: Piano Sonatas K. 283, 331, 332, 333; Midori for Paganini: 24 Caprices for Solo Violin, Op. 1	
1992	Alicia de Larrocha	Granados: Goyescas, Allegro de Concierto, Danze Lenta	Murray Perahia for The Aldeburgh Recital; Alan Feinberg for The American Romantic; Rudolf Firkusny for Janáček: Piano Music; Evgeny Kissin for Evgeny Kissin: Carnegie Hall Debut Concert	
1993	Vladimir Horowitz	Horowitz - Discovered Treasures (Chopin, Liszt, Scarlatti, Scriabin, Clementi)	Emanuel Ax for Brahms: Variations and Fugue on a Theme by Handel, Op. 24; 6 Piano Pieces, Op 118; 2 Rhapsodies, Op. 79; Jean-Yves Thibaudet for Ravel: L'Oeuvre Pour Piano Seul; Evgeny Kissin for Schubert: Fantasie in C and 4 Lieder; Brahms: Fantasien, Op. 116; Liszt: Ungarische Rhapsodie; Keith Jarrett for Shostakovich: 24 Preludes and Fugues, Op. 87	
1994	John Browning	Barber: The Complete Solo Piano Music	Marc-Andre Hamelin for Alkan: Concerto for Piano; András Schiff for Bach: Six French Suites; Richard Goode for Beethoven: Piano Sonatas...; Leon Fleisher for Leon Fleisher Recital	
1995	Emanuel Ax	Haydn: Piano Sonatas, Nos. 32, 47, 53, 59	Alan Feinberg for The American Innovator (Works of Adams, Ives, etc.); Viktoria Mullova for Bach: Partitas for Violin Solo; Evgeny Kissin for Chopin Recital, Vol. 1; Krystian Zimerman for Debussy: Preludes (Books I & II)	
1996	Radu Lupu	Schubert: Piano Sonatas (in B Flat major and A major)	Konstantin Lifschitz for Bach: Goldberg Variations; Stephen Kovacevich for Beethoven: Piano Sonatas, Op. 31; Murray Perahia for Chopin: 4 Ballades; Evgeny Kissin for Chopin Vol. 2: Sonatas No. 3, Mazurkas	
1997	Earl Wild	The Romantic Master - Works of Saint-Saëns, Handel	Yefim Bronfman for Prokofiev: Piano Sonatas Nos. 2, 3, 5, & 9; Evgeny Kissin for Schumann: Fantasy; Liszt: Transcendental Études; Radu Lupu for Schumann: Kinderszenen, Kreisleriana; Alan Feinberg for Wuorinen: Third Piano Sonata, Bagatelle, etc.; Feldman: Palais de Mari	
1998	János Starker	Bach: Suites for Cello Nos. 1-6	Pierre-Laurent Aimard for Ligeti: Works for Piano (Études, Musica Ricercata, etc.); Murray Perahia for Murray Perahia Plays Handel and Domenico Scarlatti; Leif Ove Andsnes for Schumann: Piano Sonata No. 1, Fantasy in C; Arcadi Volodos for Volodos - Piano Transcriptions (Works of Bizet, Liszt, Rachmaninoff-Volodos, etc.)	
1999	Murray Perahia	Bach: English Suites No. 1, 3, & 6	Paul Galbraith for Bach: The Complete Sonatas and Partitas for Violin, Nos. 1, 2, & 3 (Arr. for 8-String Guitar); Leif Ove Andsnes for The Long, Long Winter Night (Works of Grieg, Tveitt, Johansen); David Starobin for New Dance - 18 Dances for Guitar; Stephen Hough for New York Variations	
2000	Murray Perahia	Bach: The English Suites Nos. 2, 4, & 5	Evgeny Kissin for Chopin: The Four Ballades; Berceuse, Op. 57; Scherzo No. 4, Op. 54; Eteri Andjaparidze for Confrey: Piano Music (Kitten on the Keys; African Suite; Moods of a New Yorker, etc.); Marc-André Hamelin for Rzewski: The People United Will Never be Defeated; Down by the Riverside; Winnsboro Cotton Mill Blues; Vladimir Ashkenazy for Shostakovich: 24 Preludes & Fugues, Op. 87	
2001	Tobias Lehmann, producer; Jens Schünemann, engineer; Sharon Isbin, soloist	Dreams of a World (Works of Lauro, Ruiz-Pipò, Duarte, etc.)	Murray Perahia for Bach: The Goldberg Variations; Evgeny Kissin for Chopin: Preludes, Op. 28; Sonata No. 2, Op. 35; Polonaise, Op. 53; Marc-André Hamelin for Godowsky: The Complete Studies on Chopin's Études; Pierre-Laurent Aimard for Olivier Messiaen: Vingt Regards sur l'enfant-Jésus	
2002	Arne Akselberg, Truls Mørk producers; Arne Akselberg, engineer; Truls Mørk, soloist	Britten Cello Suites	Marc-André Hamelin for Alkan: Symphony for Solo Piano; Souvenirs: Trois Morceaux Dnas le Genre Pathetique; Duane Hulbert for Glazunov: Complete Piano Music, Vol. 1; Stephen Hough for Liszt: Sonata, Ballades and Polonaises; Maurizio Pollini for Schumann: Davidsbundlertanze, Op. 6	
2003	Andreas Neubronner, producer; Andreas Neubronner, engineer; Murray Perahia, soloist	Chopin: Études, Op. 10 & Op. 25	Leif Ove Andsnes for Grieg: Lyric Pieces (Op. 12, Book 1; Op. 38, Book 2, etc.); Earl Wild for Hahn: Le Rossignol Éperdu - Poèmes Pour Piano (Complete); Marc-André Hamelin for Kaleidoscope (Woods, Hofmann, Blumenfeld); David Holzman for Wolpe: Compositions for Piano (1920-1952)	
2004	Emanuel Ax	Haydn: Piano Sonatas Nos. 29, 31, 34, 25 & 49	András Schiff for Bach: The Goldberg Variations; Piotr Anderszewski for Bach: Partitas 1, 3 & 6; Petronel Malan for Transfigured Bach: The Bach Piano Transcriptions of Bartók, Lipatti & Friedman; Evgeny Kissin for Brahms: Sonata in F Minor; Intermezzo in A Minor, etc.	
2005	David Russell	Aire Latino (Morel, Villa-Lobos, Ponce, etc.)	Pierre-Laurent Aimard for Debussy: Images; Études; Mikhail Pletnev for Pletnev Plays Schumann (Études Symphoniques, Op. 13; Arabeske, Op. 18; Vladimir Ashkenazy for Shostakovich: Piano Works (Piano Sonata No. 2, Op. 61; Five Preludes; Nocturne, etc.); Thomas Zehetmair for Ysaÿe: Sonatas for Violin Solo, Op. 27	
2006	Evgeny Kissin	Scriabin, Medtner, Stravinsky	Nelson Freire for Chopin: Études, Op. 10; Barcarolle, Op. 60; Sonata No. 2; Sarah Schuster Ericsson for Night Breeze - Harp Music of Carlos Salzedo; Piotr Anderszewski for Szymanowski: Piano Sonata No. 3, Métopes, Masques; Maxim Vengerov for Vengerov: Kreisler, Sarasate, Paganini, Wieniawski	
2007	Maurizio Pollini	Chopin: Nocturnes	Gidon Kremer for Bach: The Sonatas and Partitas for Violin Solo; Paul O'Dette for Daniel Bacheler: The Bachelar's Delight; András Schiff for Beethoven: The Piano Sonatas, Vol. II; Roberto Díaz for Primrose: Viola Transcriptions	
2008	Garrick Ohlsson	Beethoven Sonatas, Vol. 3	Marc-André Hamelin for Haydn: Piano Sonatas; Kenneth Boulton for Louisiana - A Pianist's Journey; Manuel Barrueco for Solo Piazolla; Allison Brewster Franzetti for 20th Century Piano Sonatas	
2009	Gloria Cheng	Piano Music of Stucky, Lutosławski	Marc-André Hamelin for In a State of Jazz; Wei Li for Red Cliff Capriccio; Cameron Carpenter for Revolutionary; Joan Jeanrenaud for Strange Toys	
2010	Sharon Isbin	Journey to the New World	Caroline Goulding for Caroline Goulding; Maria João Pires for Chopin; Ursula Oppens for Oppens Plays Carter; Yuja Wang for Sonatas & Études	
2011	Paul Jacobs	Messiaen: Livre du Saint-Sacrement	Nelson Freire for Chopin: The Nocturnes; Marc-André Hamelin for Hamelin: Études; Julia Fischer for Paganini: 24 Caprices; Sarah Schuster Ericsson for 20th Century Harp Sonatas	
