= Bass =

Bass or Basses may refer to:

== Fish ==
- Bass (fish), various saltwater and freshwater species

== Wood ==
- Bass or basswood, the wood of the Tilia americana tree of eastern North America.

== Music ==
- Bass (sound), describing low-frequency sound or one of several instruments in the bass range:
  - Bass instruments commonly referred to as just "bass", including:
    - Bass guitar, the lowest-pitched member of the guitar family
    - Double bass, the largest and lowest pitched bowed string instrument
    - Tuba, often called "the bass" in the context of brass instruments
    - Bass saxophone
- Bass (voice type), a type of classical male singing voice
- Bass clef, the musical clef used for lower-sounding instruments and voices
- Bass music, broad category of electronic dance music genres, focusing on a prominent bass drum and/or bassline sound
- Bass note, the lowest note in a chord
- Bassline, or bass line, a term used in music for a lower-pitched part
- "Bass", a song by Robyn Hitchcock from his 1986 album Element of Light
- "Bass", audio file on Culture Vulture (EP) by Jesus Jones (2004)
- "Bass (How Low Can You Go)", a 1988 single by Simon Harris; also his 1989 album Bass!
- "Basses", a movement of Mike Oldfield's Tubular Bells 2003 album

== Businesses and organizations ==
- Bass Brewery, a British brewery
- Bass Anglers Sportsman Society (B.A.S.S.)
- G.H. Bass & Co., an American footwear brand founded in 1876
- Bass Pro Shops, an American outdoors company

== People ==
- Bass (surname)
- Bass Reeves (1838–1910), notable deputy U.S. marshal

=== Fictional characters ===
- Chuck Bass, a fictional character in the novel and television series Gossip Girl
- Bass Armstrong, a character from Dead or Alive
- Bass Monroe, fictional character in Revolution
- Bass and Bass.EXE, Mega Man characters
- Bass, a character from Jewel BEM Hunter Lime

== Places ==
=== Australia ===
- Bass Strait, between Australia and Tasmania
- Bass Pyramid, a small island in the Bass Strait
- Bass, Victoria, a town in Australia
- Bass Coast Shire, a local government area in Victoria
- Division of Bass, a federal electoral division in Tasmania, Australia
- Division of Bass (state), state electoral division in Tasmania, Australia
- Electoral district of Bass, a state electoral division in Victoria, Australia
- Shire of Bass, a former local government area in Victoria, Australia

=== United States ===
- Bass, Alabama, an unincorporated community in Jackson County, Alabama, U.S.
- Bass, Arkansas, an unincorporated community in Newton County, Arkansas, U.S.
- Bass, Casey County, Kentucky, U.S.
- Bass, Missouri, U.S.
- Bass, West Virginia, U.S.
- Bass Creek, a stream in Missouri
- Bass Lake (disambiguation), a number of places and lakes
- Bass River (disambiguation)
- Nancy Lee and Perry R. Bass Performance Hall, or simply Bass Performance Hall, in Fort Worth, Texas, U.S.

=== Elsewhere ===
- Al-Bass (archaeological site), Tyre, Lebanon, and the adjacent Al-Bass refugee camp
- Bass, Hansi, a sub-tehsil of Hisar district, Haryana, India
- Bass Lake (Ontario), several lakes
- Bass River (disambiguation)
- Bass Rock, or the Bass, an island in the outer part of the Firth of Forth in the east of Scotland
- Basses, Vienne, a commune of the Vienne department in France

== Other uses ==
- Bass diffusion model, or Bass model, a mathematical marketing model
- Beneath a Steel Sky, a 1994 computer adventure game
- Buttocks, in slang
- BASS, a freeware cross-platform audio library and API
- USS Bass, several vessels of the U.S. Navy

== See also ==
- Bas (disambiguation)
- Base (disambiguation)
- Bass House (disambiguation)
- Basse (disambiguation)
- Bassline (disambiguation)
- Drum and bass, a type of electronic dance music
- Figured bass, a kind of integer musical notation
- Miami bass, a type of hip hop music
- Ghettotech or Detroit Bass, a form of electronic dance music
- Sebastian (name)
