= Masques (Szymanowski) =

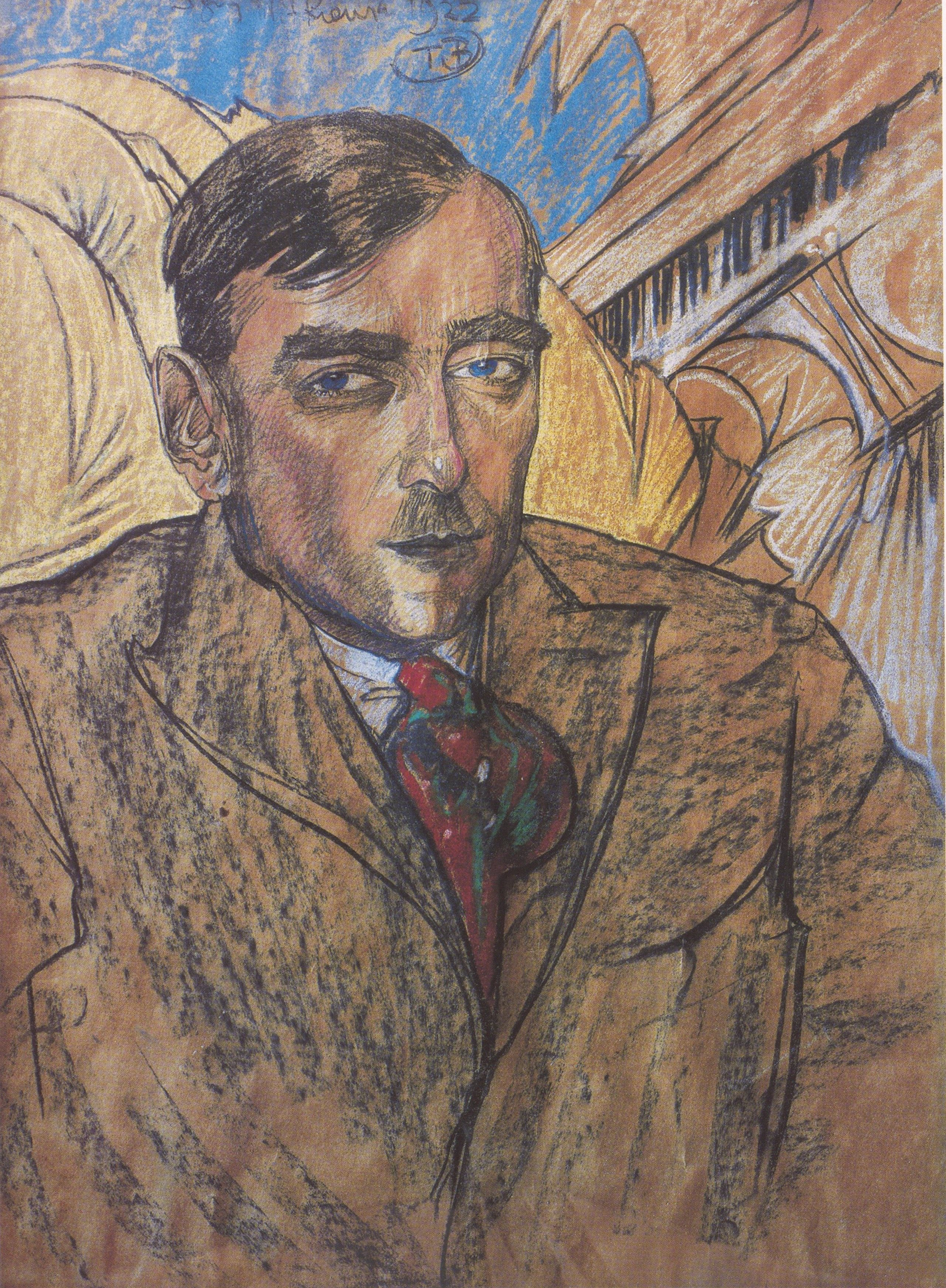
Portrait of Karol Szymanowski, 1922

Masques, Op. 34 is a work for piano written by Karol Szymanowski from 1915 to 1916.

In 1914, the composer took refuge in his home village in Ukraine and remained there until the Russian Revolution. He had returned from a long stay in Europe, Sicily and North Africa, where he drew his inspiration for these years' works. Here his style approached the Impressionism of Debussy and inaugurated a series of program music, a literary source, with his Myths for violin and piano, contemporaries of his Métopes for piano and his Masques.

The three pieces that compose the work offer access to three major myths of the Western imagination, whereas his Métopes focused on Homer. The Masques were written in a different chronological order from that of their publication, with Scheherazade initially completing the cycle. Tantris is a corruption of Tristan, taken from the myth of Tristan and Iseult and retold in a piece by Ernst Hardt where Tristan masquerades as a jester to meet his sweetheart.

Its performance lasts about twenty-five minutes.

- Schéhérazade
- Tantris le bouffon
- Sérénade de Don Juan
