= Bass Lake =

Bass Lake may refer to:

== Cities, towns, townships, unincorporated communities ==
In the United States:

- Bass Lake, California, a census-designated place in Madera County
- Bass Lake, Indiana, a census-designated place
- Bass Lake, Michigan, an unincorporated community in Grand Traverse County
- Bass Lake, Itasca County, Minnesota, an unincorporated community near Wirt
- Bass Lake, Ohio, a census-designated place
- Bass Lake, Sawyer County, Wisconsin, a town
- Big Bass Lake, Pennsylvania, a census-designated place
- Bass Lake, Washburn County, Wisconsin, a town

== Lakes ==
=== Canada ===
- Bass Lake (Ontario) – several lakes in Ontario with this name

=== United States ===
- Bass Lake (Madera County, California), a reservoir in the Sierra National Forest
- Bass Lake (Marin County, California), a small lake in Point Reyes National Seashore
- Bass Lake (Holly Springs, North Carolina)
- Bass Lake (Watauga County, North Carolina) a lake in the Moses H. Cone Memorial Park
- Bass Lake, Bass Lake, Indiana
- Bass Lake (Long Lake Township, Michigan), a small recreational lake west of Traverse City
- Bass Lake, Ely, Minnesota
- Bass Lake (Faribault County, Minnesota)
- Bass Lake (Mahnomen County, Minnesota)
- Camp Bass Lake, Owasippe Scout Reservation area near Whitehall, Michigan
- Bass Lake (Thurston County, Washington)
