= BAS =

BAS may stand for:

- Bachelor of Applied Science (BAS or BASc)
- Bachelor of Arts and Science (BAS or BASc)
- Bank of America Securities
- Basaa language, ISO 639-2 and -3 language code bas
- Basic Allowance for Subsistence in United States Military Pay
- Battalion Aid Station, US military
- Bay St. Louis station, station code BAS
- Befreiungsausschuss Südtirol (South Tyrolean Liberation Committee)
- Behavioural Activation System in Gray's biopsychological theory of personality
- Belt alternator starter, or BAS hybrid
- Bere Alston railway station, National Rail station code BAS
- Bergen Arkitekt Skole (Bergen School of Architecture)
- Biblical Archaeology Society, publisher of the BAS Library series
- Book of Alternative Services of the Anglican Church of Canada
- Brake assist system in an automobile
- British Antarctic Survey
- British Art Show
- Broadcast auxiliary service
- Brussels American School
- Building automation system
- Bulgarian Academy of Sciences
- Business Activity Statement, an Australian Taxation Office form

== See also ==
- Bas (disambiguation)
- Bass (disambiguation)
