= Basse =

Basse may refer to:

== Places ==
- Basse Santa Su, The Gambia
- Basse, Netherlands
- Bassé, Burkina Faso

== People ==
- Adja Rose Basse (1920–2005), Senegalese trade unionist
- Éliane Basse (1899–1985), French paleontologist
- Hans-Dieter von Basse (1916–1945), Oberstleutnant in the Wehrmacht during World War II
- Jeremiah Basse (died 1725), governor of West and East Jersey
- Marie Senghor Basse (1930-2019), Senegalese physician
- Maurits Basse (1868–1944), Belgian writer and teacher
- Mikkel Basse (born 1996), Danish footballer
- William Basse (c.1583–1653?), English poet
- Willie Basse (1956–2018), American hard rock musician

== Other uses ==
- Basse (game), a Norwegian bag ball game
- Basse und Selve, German engine manufacturers
- Rue Basse, a road in the 1st arrondissement of Paris, France

== See also ==
- Bass (disambiguation)
- Base (disambiguation)
