= Folia =

Type of musical composition

La Folía (Spanish), or Follies (English), also known as Folies d'Espagne (French), La Follia (Italian), and Folia (Portuguese), is one of the oldest remembered European musical themes, or primary material, generally melodic, of a composition, on record. The theme exists in two versions, referred to as early and late folias, the earlier being faster. Folias are generally characterized by having a fixed chord progression.

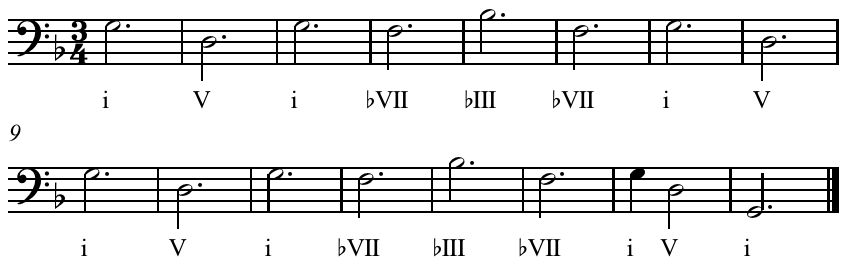
"The 'later' folia", a harmonic-metric scheme consisting of two eight-bar phrases, was first used in approximately 1670. The key signature, showing just one flat for G minor (instead of two), follows a Baroque period practice.

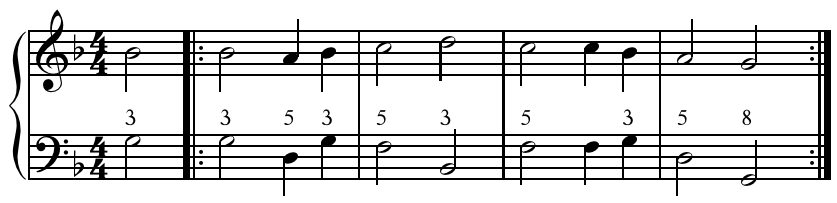
Early folia.

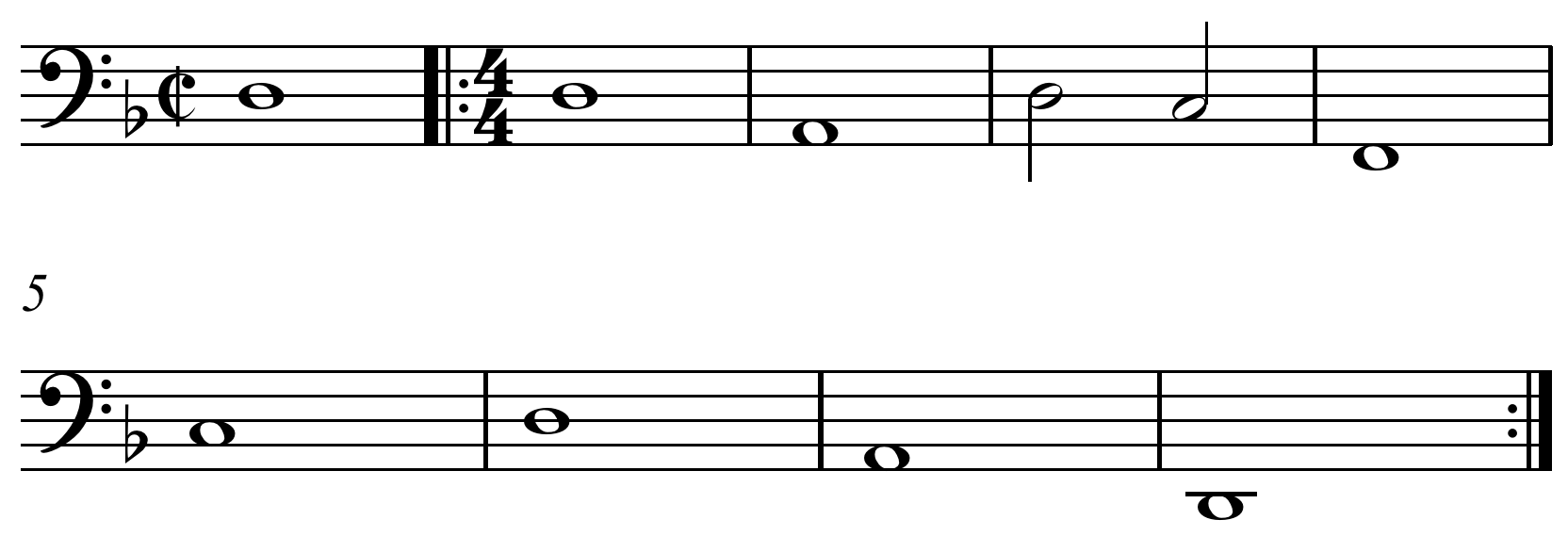
Early folia variant.

== History ==
Due to its musical form, style and etymology of the name, it has been suggested that the melody arose as a dance in the mid or late fifteenth century throughout the Iberian Peninsula, either in Portugal or in the area of the old Kingdom of León, or maybe in the Kingdom of Valencia.

The epithet "Folia" has several meanings in music.

Western classical music features both "early Folia", which can take different shapes, and the better-known "later Folia" (also known as "Follia" with double l in Italy, "Folies d'Espagne" in France, and "Faronel's Ground" in England). Recent research suggests that the origin of the folia framework lies in the application of a specific compositional and improvisational method to simple melodies in minor mode. Thus, the essence of the "early Folia" was not a specific theme or a fixed sequence of chords but rather a compositional-improvisational process which could generate these sequences of chords. The "later Folia" is a standard chord progression (i–V–i–VII / III–VII–[i or VI]–V / i–V–i–VII / III–VII–[i or VI7]–V[4–3sus]–i) and usually features a standard or "stock" melody line, a slow sarabande in triple meter, as its initial theme. This theme generally appears at the start and end of a given "folia" composition, serving as "bookends" for a set of variations within which both the melodic line and even the meter may vary. In turn, written sets of variations on the "later Folia" may contain sections consisting of more freely structured music, even in the semblance of partial or pure improvisation (a practice which might be compared in structural concept, if very different in musical material, to the performance in twelve-bar blues and other standard chord progressions that became common in the twentieth century.)

Several sources report that Jean-Baptiste Lully was the first composer to formalize the standard chord progression and melodic line. Other sources note that the chord progression eventually associated with the "later Folia" appeared in musical sources almost a century before the first documented use of the "Folia" name. The progression emerged between the end of the 15th century and the beginning of the 16th century in vocal repertory found in both Italian ("Canzoniere di Montecassino", "Canzoniere di Perugia" and in the frottola repertoire) and Spanish sources (mainly in the "Cancionero Musical de Palacio" and, some years later, in the ensaladas repertoire).

== Structure ==
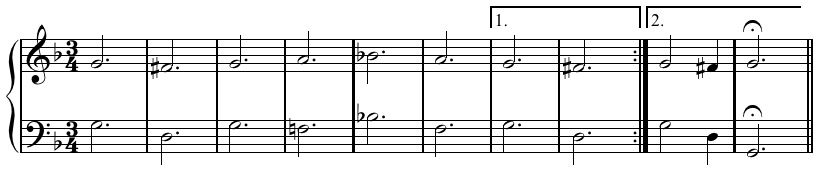
Later folia variant.

The framework of the "Later Folia", in the key of G minor, the key that is often used for the "later Folia"; one chord per bar except for the cadential penultimate bar.

The basic 16-bar chord progression:

Gm (i)	D^{7} (V^{7})	Gm (i)	F (VII)	Bb (III)	F (VII)	Gm (i)	D^{7} (V^{7})
Gm (i)	D^{7} (V^{7})	Gm (i)	F (VII)	Bb (III)	F (VII)	Gm (i) D^{7} (V^{7})	Gm (i)

== Historical significance ==
A selection from Beethoven's Symphony No. 5, the 2nd movement, illustrating a use of La Folia starting at bar 166 of the movement

Over the course of three centuries, more than 150 composers have used it in their works. The first publications of this theme date from the middle of the 16th century, but it is probably much older. Plays of the renaissance theatre in Portugal, including works by Gil Vicente, mention the folia as a dance performed by shepherds or peasants. The possible Portuguese origin was attributed by the 1577 treatise De musica libri septem by Francisco de Salinas; however, one of the oldest folías is that of "Rodrigo Martínez", by an anonymous author, already registered in the Cancionero de Palacio (1470–1500) in Spain, which includes multiple songs and themes from the time of the Catholic Monarchs.

Jean-Baptiste Lully, along with Philidor l'aîné in 1672, Arcangelo Corelli in 1700, Marin Marais in 1701, Alessandro Scarlatti in 1710, Antonio Vivaldi in his Opus 1 No. 12 of 1705, Francesco Geminiani in his Concerto Grosso No. 12 (which was, in fact, part of a collection of direct transcriptions of Corelli's violin sonatas), George Frideric Handel in the Sarabande of his Keyboard Suite in D minor HWV 437 of 1727 (also two earlier Chaconnes), and Johann Sebastian Bach in his Peasants' Cantata of 1742 are considered to highlight this "later" folia repeating theme in a brilliant way. C. P. E. Bach composed a set of 12 variations for keyboard on the tune (H.263). Antonio Salieri's 26 Variations on La Folia, for orchestra, written towards the end of his career, is one of his finest works. Henry Purcell, in: The Fairy-Queen, first played in 1692, included a tune with resemblances to the Francesco Geminiani/Arcangelo Corelli: Concerto Grosso n 12; the 12 Corelli concerts were published in 1714, although a 1681 reference exists from Georg Muffat about having heard the compositions of this "Italian Violin Orpheus" "with extreme pleasure and full of admiration."

In the 19th century, the Act I ballet of Les Abencérages (1813) by Luigi Cherubini is based on the Folia, Franz Liszt included a version of the Folia in his Rhapsodie Espagnole, and Ludwig van Beethoven quoted it briefly in the second movement of his Fifth Symphony. Alfredo Casella used the theme as the basis for his Variations sur une Chaconne. Joseph Leopold Eybler composed a rich version for orchestra.

La Folia once again regained composers' interest during the 1930s with Sergei Rachmaninov in his Variations on a theme by Corelli in 1931 and Manuel María Ponce and his Variations on "Spanish Folia" and Fugue for guitar.

La Folia
Without variations (290KB)

The Folia melody has also influenced Scandinavian folk music. It is said that around half of the old Swedish tunes are based on La Folia. It is possible to recognize a common structure in multiple Swedish folk tunes, and it is similar to the Folia structure. Old folk tunes (19th century or older) which do not have this structure often come from parts of Sweden with little influences from upper classes or other countries. "Sinclairvisan" is set to the tune, as is "Välment sorgesyn", no. 5b from Carl Michael Bellman's Songs of Fredman.

The final section of Force Majeure by the electronic music group Tangerine Dream is built upon the later La Follia progression, and is specifically referenced in the fifth track from their 2014 work Josephine The Mouse Singer, titled "Arcangelo Corelli's La Folia." It is also used in the Taizé chant "Laudate Dominum." The main theme of Vangelis' Conquest of Paradise resembles the rhythmic paradigm of la folia intentionally. The chord progression is also used in the Britney Spears song, Oops!... I Did It Again, 2000. The Folia is used extensively in Max Richter's 2017 album Three Worlds: Music from Woolf Works.

== See also ==
- Bergamesca
- Moresca
- Passamezzo antico
- Romanesca
