= Little Bass River =

Little Bass River may refer to:

- Little Bass River (East Gippsland), in Victoria, Australia
- Little Bass River, Nova Scotia, Canada

== See also ==
- Bass River (disambiguation)
