= Evgeny Kissin =

Russian classical pianist

- Евгений Кисин
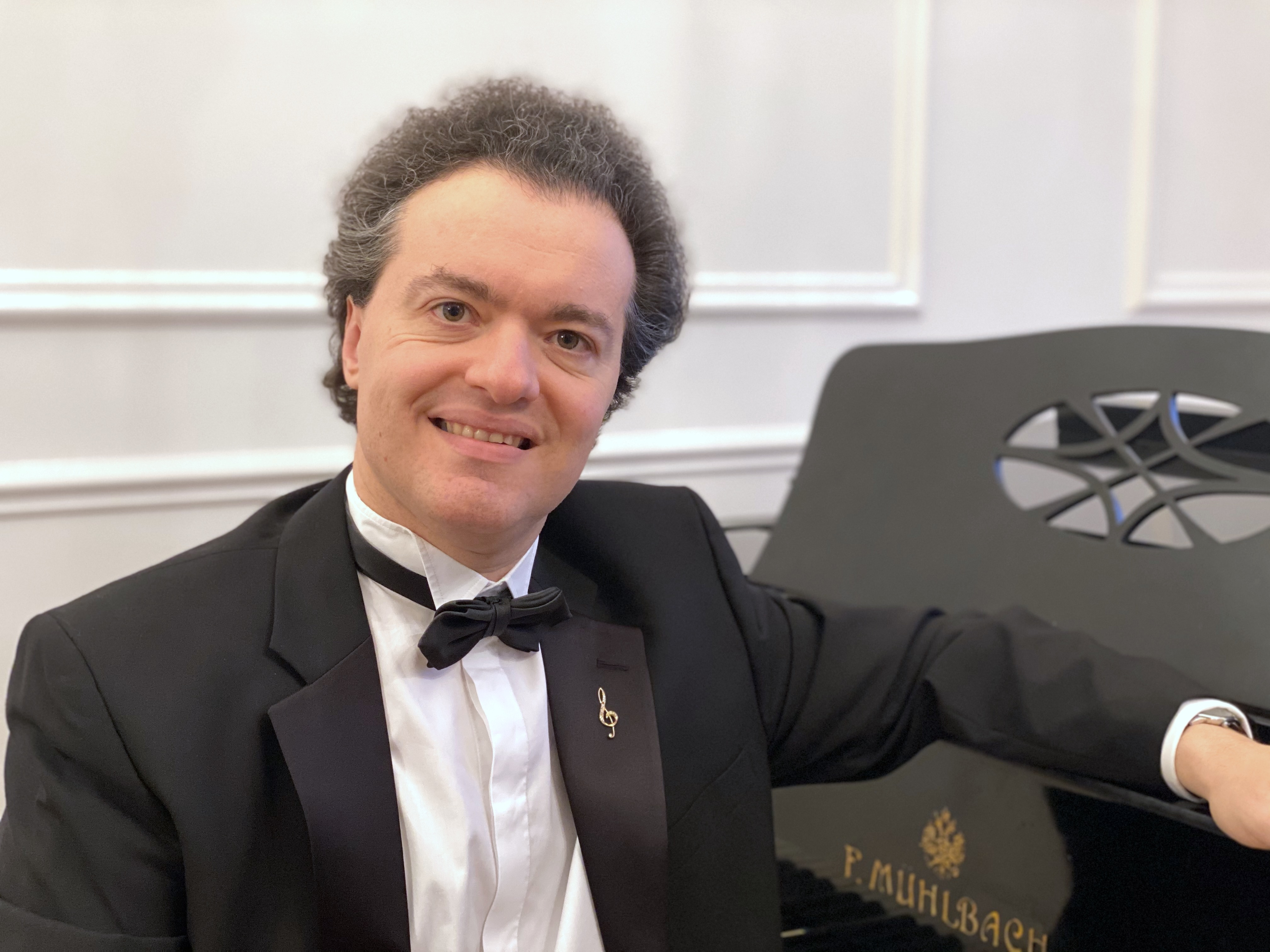
- Kissin in 2021
- Born: 10 October 1971 (age 55); Moscow, Russian SFSR, Soviet Union
- Education: Gnessin State Musical College
- Occupation: Musician
- Years active: 1982–present
- Spouse: Karina Arzumanova (m. 2017)
- Parents: Igor Kissin (father); Emilia Kissina (mother)
- Website: www.kissin.org

Evgeny Igorevich Kissin (Russian: Евгений Игоревич Кисин; Yiddish: יעווגעני קיסין, romanized: Yevgeni Kisin; born 10 October 1971) is a Russian-born concert pianist and composer. He became a British citizen in 2002 and an Israeli citizen in 2013. He first came to international fame as a child prodigy. He has a wide repertoire and is especially known for his interpretations of the works of the Romantic era, particularly those of Franz Schubert, Frédéric Chopin, Robert Schumann, Franz Liszt, Johannes Brahms, Sergei Rachmaninoff, Modest Mussorgsky, and Ludwig van Beethoven. He is commonly viewed as a great successor of the Russian piano school because of the depth, lyricism and poetic quality of his interpretations.

== Early life and education ==
Kissin was born in Moscow to Jewish parents. Recognized as a child prodigy at age six, he began piano studies at the city's Gnessin Music School where he became a student of Anna Kantor (1923–2021), who was to remain his only piano teacher.

At age ten he made his performing debut with Mozart's Piano Concerto No. 20 with the Ulyanovsk Symphony Orchestra. A year later he gave his first recital, in Moscow. His talents were revealed outside Russia after 27 March 1984 when, still only twelve, he recorded both of Chopin's piano concertos for Melodiya with Dmitri Kitayenko and the Moscow Philharmonic at the Moscow Conservatory.

== Career ==
=== Concert pianist ===
Kissin's first appearances outside Russia were in 1985 in Eastern Europe, followed a year later by his first tour of Japan.

In 1987, at age sixteen, he made his West European debut at the Berlin Festival as well as his United Kingdom debut, alongside conductor Valery Gergiev and violinists Maxim Vengerov and Vadim Repin, at The Lichfield Festival. In 1988 he toured Europe with the Moscow Virtuosi and Vladimir Spivakov and also made his London debut with the London Symphony Orchestra under Valery Gergiev. In December of the same year he played Tchaikovsky's Piano Concerto No. 1 with Herbert von Karajan at the Berlin Philharmonic's New Year's Eve Concert which was broadcast internationally, with the performance repeated the following year at the Salzburg Easter Festival. In September 1990, he made his North American debut playing Chopin's two piano concertos with the New York Philharmonic under Zubin Mehta and the first piano recital in Carnegie Hall's centennial season.

In 1997 he gave the first solo piano recital in the history of The Proms in London.

Kissin made regular recital tours of Europe, America and Asia. He has performed with nearly all the leading orchestras of the world, under such conductors as Claudio Abbado, Vladimir Ashkenazy, Daniel Barenboim, Myung-Whun Chung, Sir Colin Davis, Vladimir Fedoseyev, Valery Gergiev, Carlo Maria Giulini, Mariss Jansons, Herbert von Karajan, Dmitri Kitaenko, Jan Latham-Koenig, Emmanuel Krivine, James Levine, Sir Andrew Davis, Lorin Maazel, Zubin Mehta, Riccardo Muti, Andris Nelsons, Seiji Ozawa, Sir Antonio Pappano, Sir Simon Rattle, Sir Georg Solti, Vladimir Spivakov, Yevgeny Svetlanov and Yuri Temirkanov. He has also performed chamber music with Martha Argerich, Mikhail Pletnev, Gidon Kremer, James Levine, Mischa Maisky, Thomas Quasthoff, Isaac Stern, Itzhak Perlman, Karita Mattila, Dmitry Hvorostovsky, Joshua Bell, Leonidas Kavakos, Natalia Gutman, Yuri Bashmet, Vladimir Spivakov, the Emerson String Quartet and others.

=== Poetry ===
In addition to Western classical music, Kissin has given recitations of Russian and Yiddish poetry, and discussed his admiration for the Yiddish language in interviews about his life. Three CDs of Kissin's recitals from the classical and contemporary Yiddish poetry have been issued by the Forward Association.

=== Writing ===
In 2018 Kissin's autobiography was published under the title of Memoirs and Reflections. In 2019 his book of poems, short stories and translations in Yiddish was published under the title "A Yiddisher Sheygets". In 2021, his book of short stories and diaries in Yiddish was published under the title "Bloyz etlekhe minut gang" ("Only a few minutes by foot").

=== Compositions ===
Kissin has composed numerous musical works which have been published by Henle Verlag, including Four Piano Pieces, Op. 1 and Violoncello Sonata, op. 2.

His String Quartet, Op. 3 (2016) was recorded by the Kopelman Quartet on Nimbus Records and received its UK premiere on 26 February 2019 performed by the Endellion Quartet.

== Views ==
Kissin has been an outspoken critic of the Russian invasion of Ukraine. In 2022, Kissin and other Russian artists signed a letter against the invasion. The piano trio he composed in response to the invasion was premiered in Amsterdam on 14 October 2022. Kissin was declared a foreign agent by the Russian government in July 2024.

In 2025, Kissin stated that he believes Israel is fighting a defensive war in Gaza.

== Personal life ==
On 10 March 2017 Kissin married Karina Arzumanova, a childhood friend, in Prague, where they live.

== Awards and accolades ==
Many musical awards and tributes from around the world have been bestowed upon Kissin. In 1987 he received the Crystal Prize of the Osaka Symphony Hall for the best performance of the year in 1986 (his first performance in Japan). In 1991 he received the Musician of the Year Prize from the Chigiana Academy of Music in Siena, Italy. He performed at the 1992 Grammy Awards Ceremony, where he played the finale of Liszt's Spanish Rhapsody. That same year his Carnegie Hall debut album was nominated for the Grammy Award for Best Instrumental Soloist Performance, though he lost to pianist Alicia de Larrocha. He became Musical America's youngest Instrumentalist of the Year in 1995. In 1997 he received the Triumph Award for his outstanding contribution to Russia's culture, one of the highest cultural honors to be awarded in the Russian Republic, and again, the youngest-ever awardee. He was the first pianist to be invited to give a recital at the BBC Proms (1997), and, in the 2000 season, was the first concerto soloist ever to be invited to play in the Proms opening concert.

In May 2001 Kissin was awarded an Honorary Doctorate of Music by the Manhattan School of Music. In December 2003 in Moscow, he received the Shostakovich Award, one of Russia's highest musical honors. In June 2005 he was awarded an Honorary Membership of the Royal Academy of Music in London. In March 2009 he was awarded an Honorary Doctorate of Letters from the University of Hong Kong.

- 1995: Musical America, Instrumentalist of the Year
- 1997: Triumph Award, Outstanding Contribution to Russia's Culture (he is the youngest awardee)
- 2001: Honorary Doctorate of Music, Manhattan School of Music, New York
- 2005: Honorary Membership of the Royal Academy of Music
- 2005: Herbert von Karajan Award, Baden-Baden, Germany (2005)
- 2006: Grammy Award for Best Instrumental Soloist Performance – for recordings of Sonatas by Alexander Scriabin and Nikolai Medtner and Three Movements from Pétrouchka by Igor Stravinsky
- 2007: Arturo Benedetti Michelangeli Award, Brescia, Italy
- 2009: Doctor of Letters honoris causa, The University of Hong Kong
- 2009: Grammy Award for Best Instrumental Soloist(s) Performance (with orchestra) – for recordings of the Second and Third Piano Concertos of Sergei Prokofiev with the Philharmonia Orchestra, conducted by Vladimir Ashkenazy
- 2010: Honorary Doctorate, Hebrew University of Jerusalem
- 2010: Second Grammy Award for Best Instrumental Soloist(s) Performance (with orchestra)
- 2021: Honorary Doctorate, National Academy of Music (Bulgaria)
