= Harnasie =

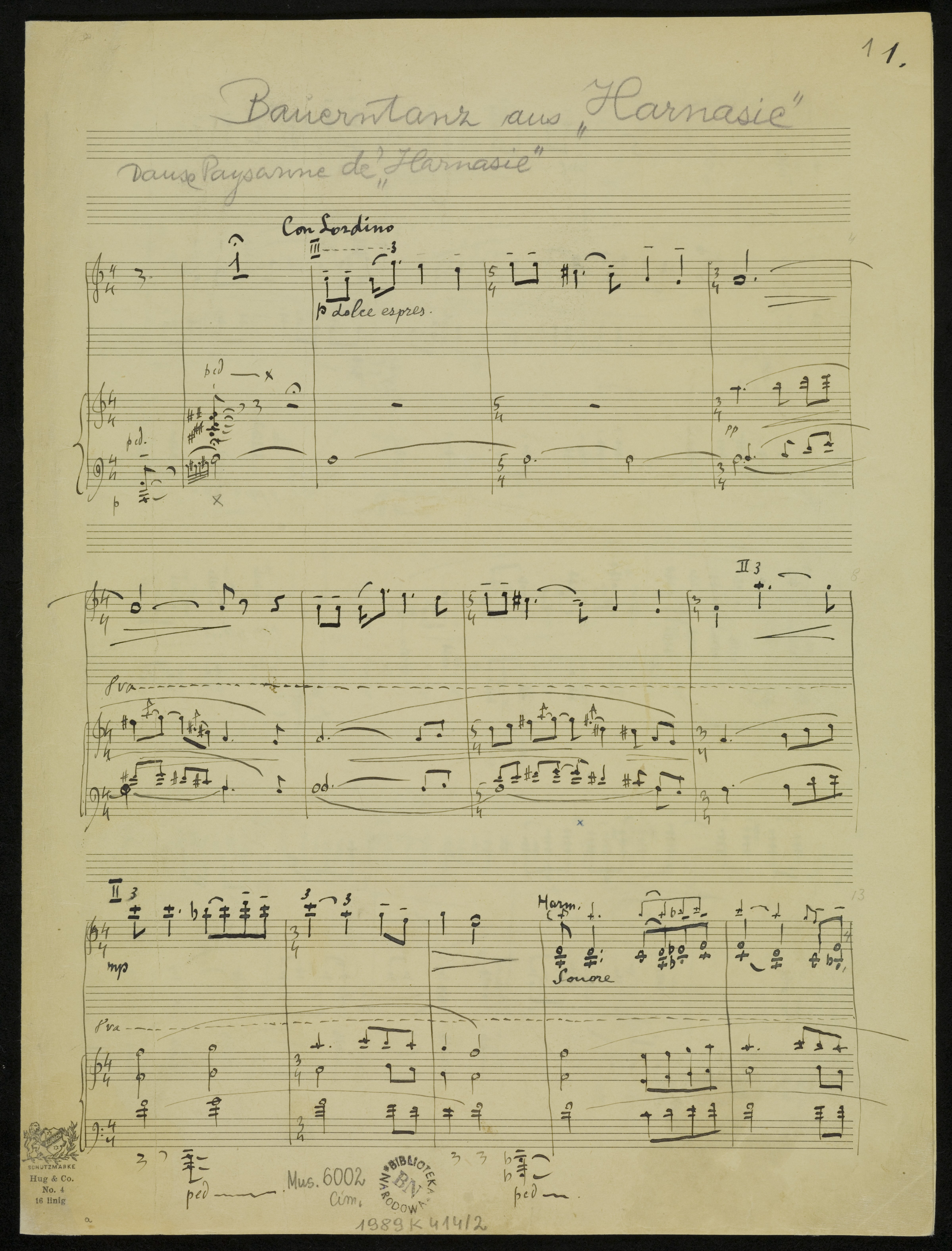
Farmers dance

Harnasie, Op. 55, is a ballet-pantomime written by the Polish composer Karol Szymanowski between 1923 and 1931, to a libretto by Jerzy Rytard and his wife and Jarosław Iwaszkiewicz, the librettist of Szymanowski's opera, King Roger.

The story is set in the Tatra Mountains and is based on the legend of the abduction of a bride by the robber Harnaś and his band (the "Harnasie" of the title). Szymanowski first visited Zakopane in the Tatras in 1921 and studied the music and folklore of the Gorals people. The score makes extensive use of folk-song and employs a choir with tenor solo.

The ballet comprises two acts, preceded by a prelude. There are only three principal characters: a shepherd, a girl and the robber (Harnaś). In the first scene, the shepherd is driving his sheep to pasture and the girl encounters Harnaś. In the second scene, Harnaś kidnaps the girl from her wedding. The third scene, in the robber's den, concludes in an epilogue with a lively dance.

The ballet was first performed on 11 May 1935 at Národní Divadlo in Prague in a choreography by Jelizaveta Nikolská, a second production, choreographed by Serge Lifar followed on 27 April 1936 at Palais Garnier in Paris. There it proved an exceptional success for Szymanowski nearly a year before his death. The Polish premiere took place at Teatr Wielki in Poznań on 9 April 1938 in a choreography by Maksymilian Stakiewicz.
