= Mythes (Szymanowski) =

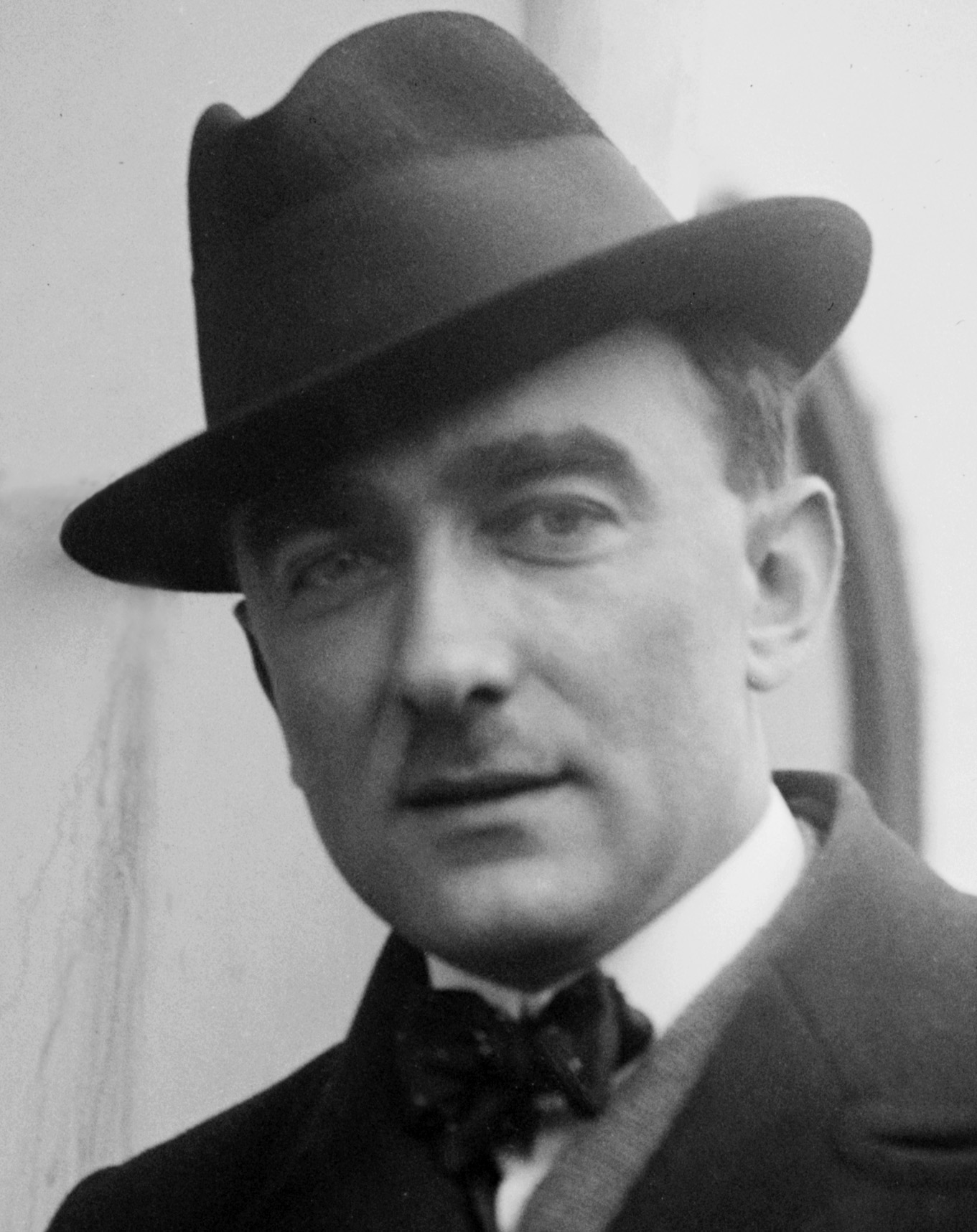
Karol Szymanowski in 1922

Mythes, Op. 30 is a suite for violin and piano written by Karol Szymanowski in 1915 and premiered one year later by Paul Kochanski on violin and the composer on piano. It is dedicated to Kochanski's wife, Zofia Kochańska.

Similarly to Métopes composed around the same time, Mythes consists of three programmatic miniature tone poems drawing on Greek mythology. The piece was heavily inspired by the composer's earlier travels in Sicily and North Africa and by impressionist music.

The work is considered an important milestone in 20th-century violin writing and was heavily admired by Szymanowski's contemporaries, such as Béla Bartók and Sergei Prokofiev. It features heavy use of advanced violin techniques, and the third movement famously contains quarter tones.

A performance usually lasts about twenty minutes.

== Structure ==
The piece has three movements, each depicting a scene from Greek mythology:

1. La fontaine d'Arethuse (The Fountain of Arethusa)
2. Narcisse (Narcissus)
3. Dryades et Pan (Dryads and Pan)
