= Bas =

Bas may refer to:

== People ==
- Bas (name), a given name and a surname
- Bas (rapper) (born 1987)

== Chemistry ==
- Boron arsenide (BAs), a chemical compound
- Barium sulfide (BaS), a chemical compound

== Other uses ==
- bas (French for "low"), as in bas-relief sculpture
- Tamburica, a stringed instrument sometimes known as bas
- BAS (accounting), the Swedish accounting principles and chart of accounts

== See also ==
- BAS (disambiguation)
- Bass (disambiguation)
