= Rhapsodie espagnole (Liszt) =

Composition for piano by Franz Liszt

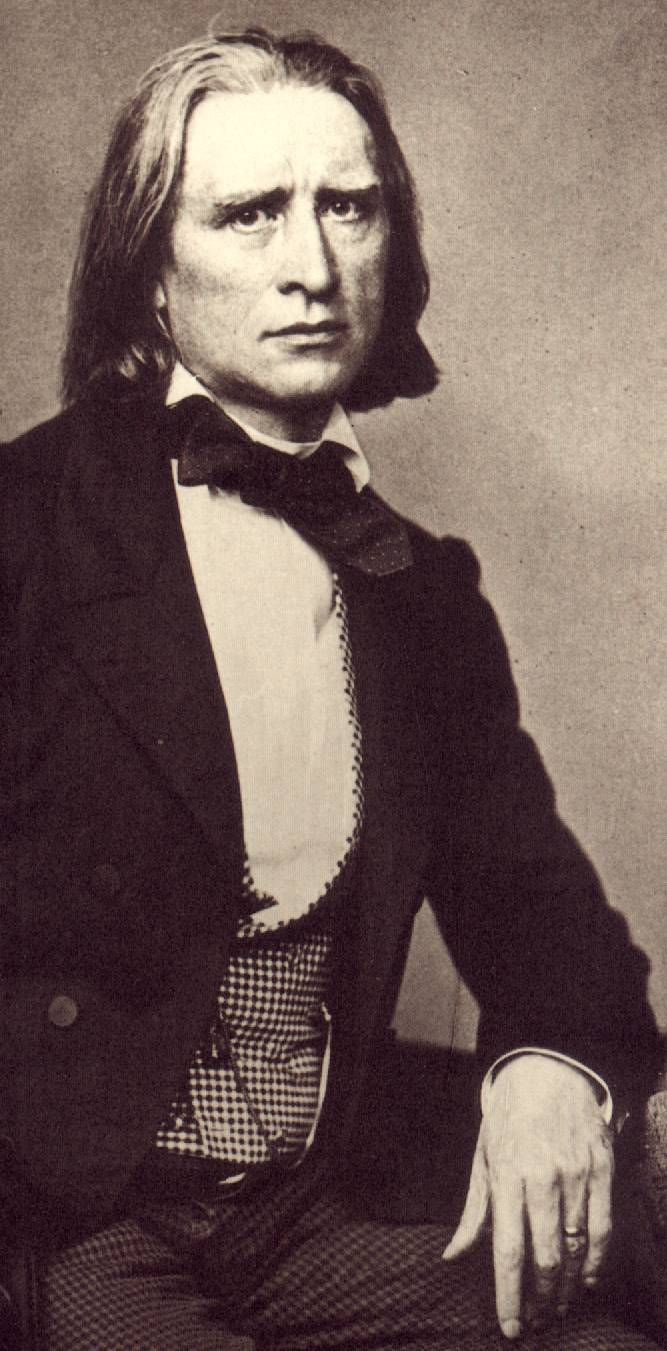
Franz Liszt in 1858

Rhapsodie espagnole (Spanish Rhapsody), S.254, R.90, is a composition for solo piano composed by Franz Liszt in 1858. The piece is very suggestive of traditional Spanish music, and was inspired by Liszt's tour in Spain and Portugal in 1845. When played, this piece takes roughly 11–14 minutes and contains many technical challenges, including rapid chords, thirds and octaves. It has long been a part of the standard repertoire and often sees play in piano competitions. Ferruccio Busoni arranged the piece for piano and orchestra in 1894.

The piece is a substantial revision of an earlier work by Liszt, the Grosse Konzertfantasie über spanische Weisen S. 253, to the point where the two works can be considered independent of each other. It includes free variations on La Folia and Jota Aragonesa. It was a specialty of Lazar Berman who recorded it multiple times.
