= Marie Senghor Basse =

Senegalese physician (1930–2019)

Marie-Thérèse Camille Senghor Basse
- Born: March 20, 1930; Rufisque
- Died: 2019
- Education: Faculty of Medicine, Paris, 1957
- Occupation: Physician
- Spouse: Edouard Camille Basse

Marie Senghor Basse (1930-2019), full name Marie-Thérèse Camille Senghor Basse, was a Senegalese physician who led the Centre de protection maternelle et infantile (Maternal and Child Protection Center). Basse represented Senegal at the Food and Agriculture Organization of the United Nations (FAO) and directed the Institute of Food Technology.

== Early life ==
Basse was the niece of the first Senegalese Head of State. Basse graduated from the Faculty of Medicine of Paris in 1957.

== Career ==
In 1958, Basse was assigned to the Bally Hospital in Conakry, then transferred to the medical district of Boké. After residing in Guinea for two years, Basse returned to Senegal, where she was in charge of directing the Maternal and Child Protection Center. Later in Italy, she served as Senegal's permanent representative to the Food and Agriculture Organization of the United Nations (FAO) from 1961 to 1966. There she worked alongside her husband Edouard Camille Basse, the Senegalese ambassador to Italy.

Upon the couple's return to Senegal, Basse was assigned as a medical inspector to the Dakar Medical School for two years. In 1968, she was appointed director of Senegal's l'Institut de Technologie Alimentaire (Institute of Food Technology) where she researched the processing of fruits, vegetables, grains, and animal products. Basse was frequently seen on Senegalese national television (ORTS) promoting "local consumption" of foods. This was done by changing behaviour and eating habits. She showed women and households healthy ways to consume local products such as pamiblé bread, corn or millet cakes, concentrated juices of local produce such as bissap and maad, and beef charcuterie.

In 1981, Basse joined Prime Minister Habib Thiam's office as a technical advisor. At the age of 51, Basse enrolled in the Dakar Business Management School (succeeded by the modern CESAG) and earned an MBA degree in business management (DESGE) in 1983. That year, she joined President Abdou Diouf's office as a technical advisor, an office she held for two years.

Basse was a founding member of the Senegalese section of the African Cultural Community, an organization founded by Wole Soyinka that seeks to aid African intellectuals and artists in adapting to the unique challenges of the modern era.

== Death ==
Basse died in 2019.
