= Karol Szymanowski =

Polish composer (1882–1937)

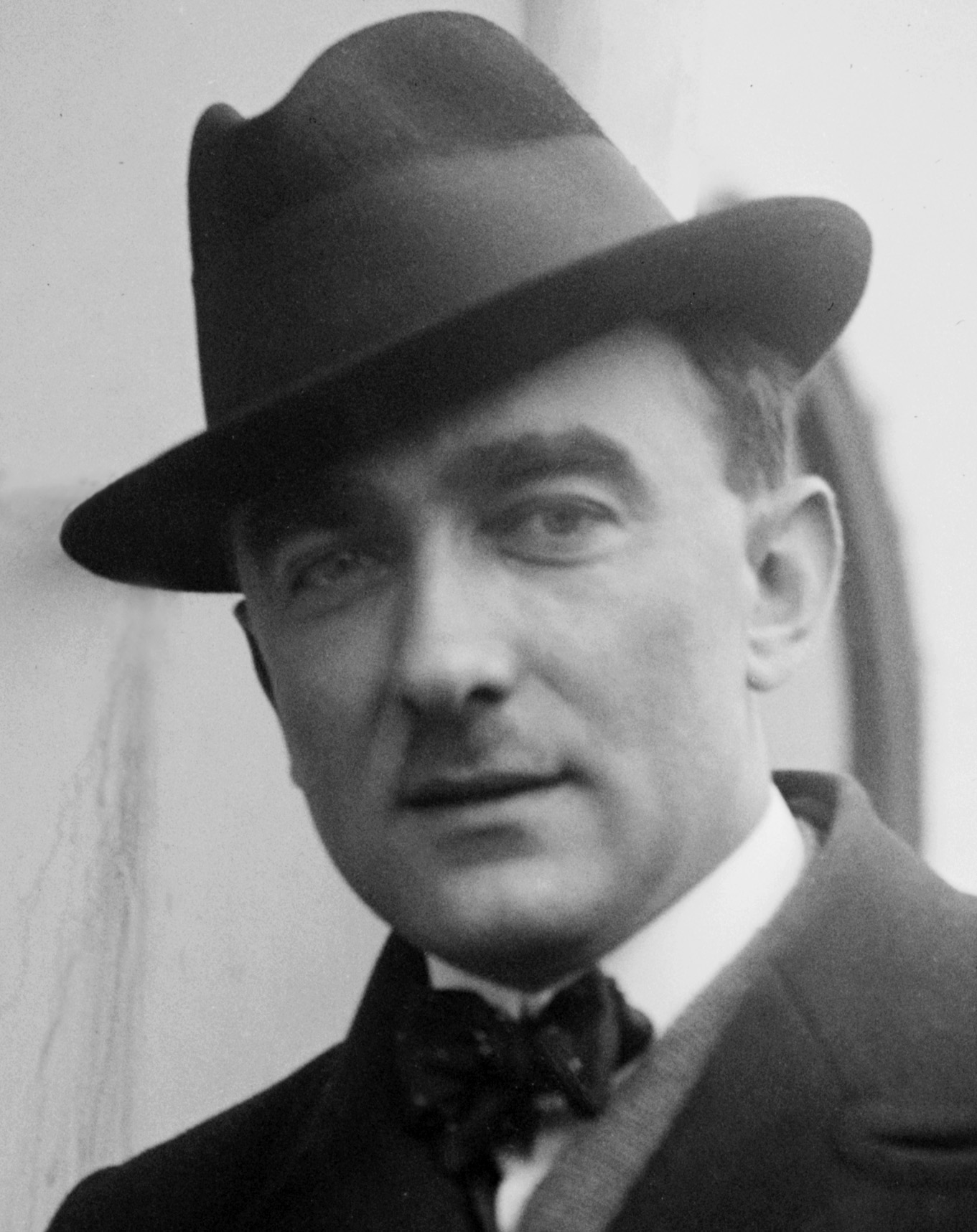
- Szymanowski in 1922
- Born: Karol Maciej Szymanowski; 3 October 1882; Tymoszówka, Russian Empire (now Tymoshivka, Ukraine)
- Died: 29 March 1937 (aged 54); Lausanne, Switzerland
- Works: List of compositions

Karol Maciej Szymanowski (Polish pronunciation: [ˈkarɔl ˈmat͡ɕɛj ʂɨmaˈnɔfskʲi]; 3 October 1882 – 29 March 1937) (Note: There is a debate among musicologists as to whether he died shortly before or shortly after midnight between 28 and 29 March.) was a Polish composer, pianist and writer. He was a member of the modernist Young Poland movement that flourished in the late 19th and early 20th century.

Szymanowski's early works show the influence of the late Romantic German school as well as the early works of Alexander Scriabin, as exemplified by his Étude Op. 4 No. 3 and his first two symphonies. Later, he developed an impressionistic and partially atonal style, represented by such works as the Third Symphony and his Violin Concerto No. 1. His third period was influenced by the folk music of the Polish Górale people; works from this period include the ballet Harnasie, the Fourth Symphony, and his sets of Mazurkas for piano. King Roger, composed between 1918 and 1924, remains Szymanowski's most popular opera. His other significant works include Hagith, Symphony No. 2, The Love Songs of Hafiz, and Stabat Mater.

Szymanowski was awarded the highest national honors, including the Officer's Cross of the Order of Polonia Restituta, the Order of Merit of the Republic of Poland and other distinctions, both Polish and foreign.

== Life and career ==
=== Early life ===
Karol Szymanowski was born into the Korwin-Szymanowski family who were members of wealthy Polish nobility from the Mazovia region, the capital of which is Warsaw. After the fall of Kościuszko Uprising (1794), his great-great grandfather Dominik was exiled from Poland to Dnieper Ukraine. Karol's grandfather Feliks later settled in the village of Tymoszówka, which was then in the Kiev Governorate of the Russian Empire and is now Tymoshivka in Cherkasy Oblast of Ukraine. His mother came from a Baltic German family that originated in Courland. He studied music privately with his father before enrolling at the Gustav Neuhaus Elisavetgrad School of Music in 1892. Szymanowski made many early attempts at composition, most of which are lost. The only surviving music written by Szymanowski before his 18 years of age are his Nine Preludes for solo piano, Op. 1, some of which were written as early as 1896, when the composer was 14 years old. From 1901 until 1905, he attended the State Conservatory in Warsaw, of which he was later director from 1926 until retiring in 1930. During that time, he met a number of prominent Polish artists such as Arthur Rubinstein, Grzegorz Fitelberg, Stanisław Ignacy Witkiewicz and Stefan Żeromski. Since musical opportunities in Congress Poland were quite limited, he traveled throughout Europe and North Africa.

=== Career ===
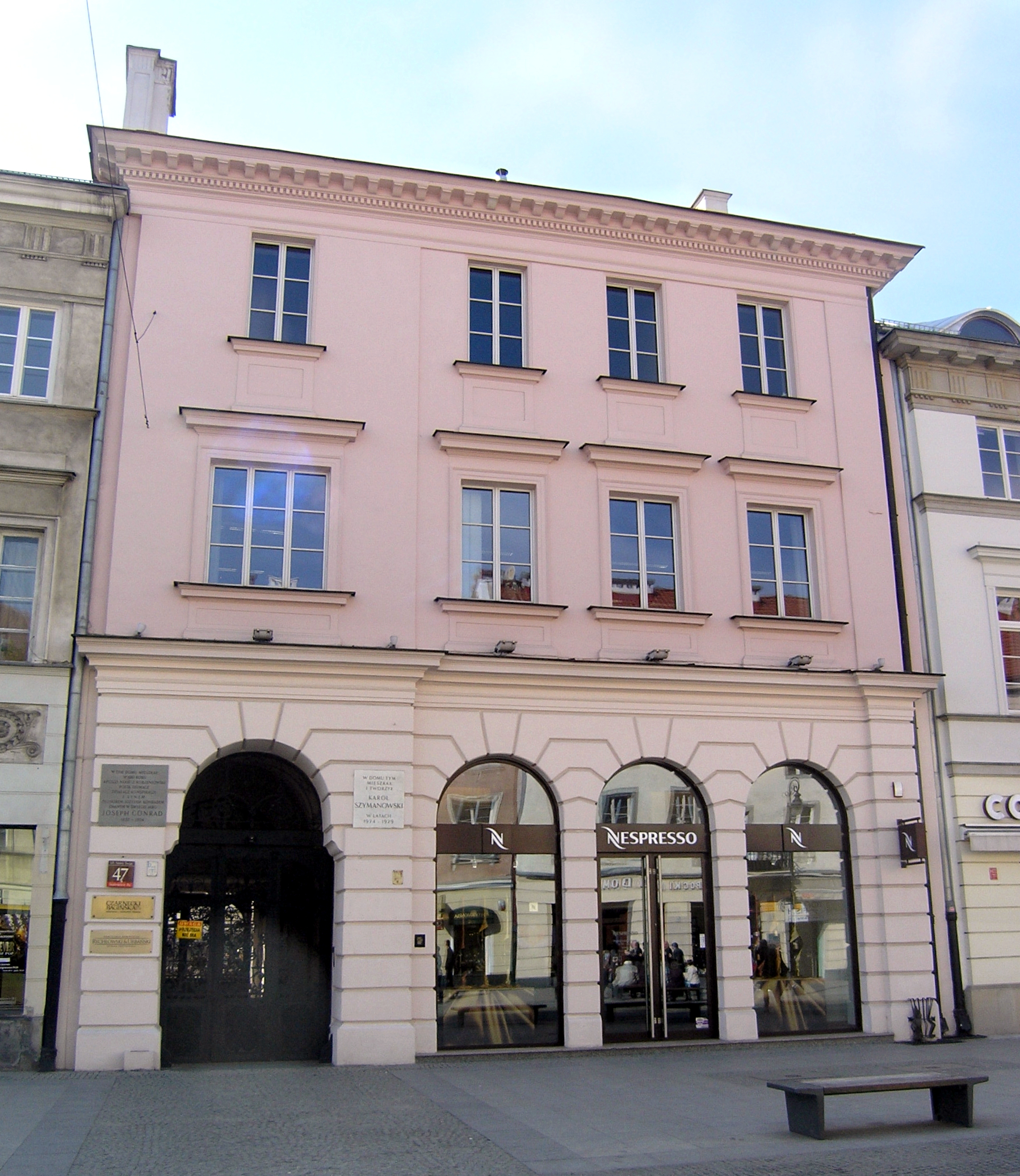
Nowy Świat 47 street, Warsaw, where Szymanowski lived and composed in 1924–29

In Berlin, Szymanowski founded the Young Polish Composers' Publishing Company (1905–1912), whose primary aim was to publish new works by his countrymen. During his stay in Vienna (1911–1914), he wrote the opera Hagith and two song cycles, The Love Songs of Hafiz, which represent a transition between his first and second stylistic periods. Being lame in one knee made Szymanowski unsuitable for military service in World War I, and between 1914 and 1917, he composed many works and devoted himself to studying Islamic culture, ancient Greek drama, and philosophy. His works from this period, such as Mity (1914; Myths), Metopy (1915; Métopes), and Maski (1916; Masques), are characterized by great originality and diversity of style. The dynamic extremes in Szymanowski's music lessened, and the composer started to employ coloristic orchestration and use polytonal and atonal material while preserving the expressive melodic style of his previous works.

In 1918, Szymanowski completed the manuscript (now mostly lost) of a two-volume novel, Efebos, which took homosexuality as its subject. ("Efebos" or ephebos is the Greek term for a male adolescent.) His travels, especially those to the Mediterranean area, provided him with new experience, both personal and artistic. Arthur Rubinstein found Szymanowski different when they met in Paris in 1921: "Karol had changed; I had already begun to be aware of it before the war when a wealthy friend and admirer of his invited him twice to visit Sicily. After his return, he raved about Sicily, especially Taormina. 'There,' he said, 'I saw a few young men bathing who could be models for Antinous. I couldn't take my eyes off them.' Now he was a confirmed homosexual. He told me all this with burning eyes".

Of his works created or first imagined, such as Król Roger (King Roger), during 1917-21, both musical and literary, one critic has written: "we have a body of work representing a dazzling personal synthesis of cultural references, crossing the boundaries of nation, race and gender to form an affirmative belief in an international society of the future based on the artistic freedom granted by Eros." Szymanowski settled in Warsaw in 1919.

=== Later life and death ===
Villa Atma, Szymanowski's house in Zakopane, now the Karol Szymanowski Museum

In 1926, Szymanowski accepted the position of Director of the Warsaw Conservatory, though he had little administrative experience. He became seriously ill in 1928 and temporarily lost his post. He was diagnosed with an acute form of tuberculosis, and in 1929 traveled to Davos, Switzerland, for medical treatment. Szymanowski resumed his position at the Conservatory in 1930, but the school was closed two years later by a ministerial decision. He moved to Villa Atma in Zakopane where he composed fervently. In Zakopane, Szymanowski developed a keen interest in the Polish folk idiom and undertook to create a Polish national style, an endeavour not attempted since the times of Chopin. He immersed himself in the culture of the Polish Highlanders (Gorals) and embraced their tonal language, syncopated rhythms, and winding melodies in his music. In 1936, Szymanowski received more treatment at a sanatorium in Grasse, but it was no longer effective. He died at a sanatorium in Lausanne on 29 March 1937. His body was brought back to Poland by his sister Stanisława and laid to rest at Skałka in Kraków, the "national Panthéon" for the most distinguished Poles.

Szymanowski's long correspondence with the pianist Jan Smeterlin, a significant champion of his piano works, was published in 1969.

== Influences ==
Szymanowski was influenced by the music of Richard Wagner, Richard Strauss, Max Reger, Alexander Scriabin and the impressionism of Claude Debussy, and Maurice Ravel. He was also significantly influenced by his countryman Frédéric Chopin and by Polish folk music. Like Chopin, he wrote a number of mazurkas for piano. He was specifically influenced by the folk music of the Polish Highlanders, which he discovered in Zakopane in the southern Tatra highlands. He wrote in his article "About Goral Music": "My discovery of the essential beauty of Goral music, dance and architecture is a very personal one; much of this beauty I have absorbed into my innermost soul". According to Jim Samson, it is "played on two fiddles and a string bass" and "has uniquely 'exotic' characteristics, highly dissonant and with fascinating heterophonic effects".

Aleksander Laskowski has said of Szymanowski's music and its changing style: "He invented a musical language [...] His works were true and ingenious creations. And his oeuvre shows an incredible development from the Straussian and Wagnerian, through an interesting and very romantic Oriental period, and finishing with a national period influenced by his time in the Tatras."

== Works ==
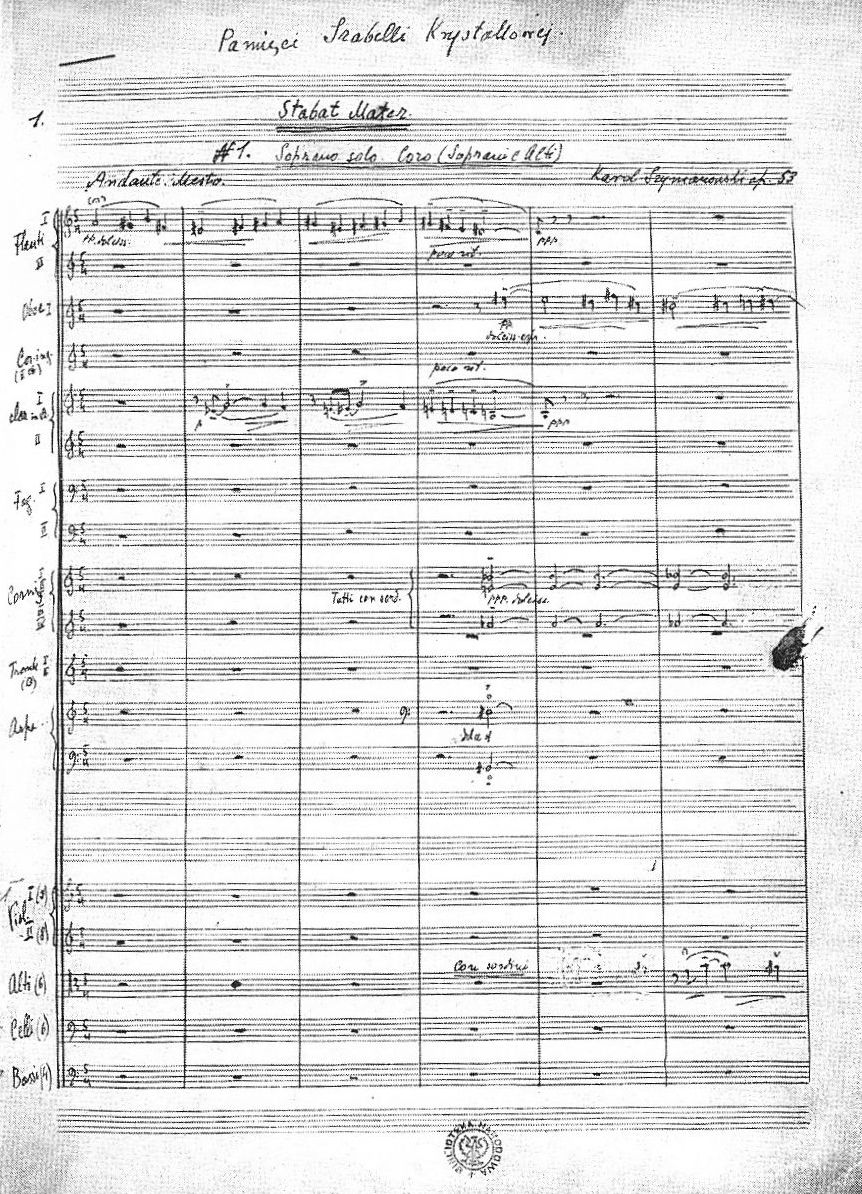
Autograph of the Stabat Mater score commissioned by Bronisław Krystall, 1926

Among Szymanowski's better-known orchestral works are four symphonies (including No. 3, Song of the Night, with choir and vocal soloists, and No. 4, Symphonie Concertante, with piano concertante) and two violin concertos. His stage works include the ballets Harnasie and Mandragora and the operas Hagith and King Roger. He wrote much piano music, including the four Études, Op. 4 (of which No. 3 was once his most popular piece), many mazurkas and Métopes. Other works include the Three Myths for violin and piano, Nocturne and Tarantella, two string quartets, a sonata for violin and piano, a number of orchestral songs (some to texts by Hafiz and James Joyce) and his Stabat Mater.

According to Samson, "Szymanowski adopted no thorough-going alternatives to tonal organization [...] the harmonic tensions and relaxations and the melodic phraseology have clear origins in tonal procedure, but [...] an underpinning tonal framework has been almost or completely dissolved away."

== Recognition ==
Szymanowski's music has received international recognition. In the 1920s and the 1930s, his music proved immensely popular. His works were performed throughout the world by soloists such as Arthur Rubinstein, Harry Neuhaus, Robert Casadesus, Paweł Kochański, Bronisław Huberman, Joseph Szigeti, and Jacques Thibaud, and by orchestras led by conductors including Emil Młynarski, Albert Coates, Pierre Monteux, Philippe Gaubert, Leopold Stokowski, and Willem Mengelberg. European and American performances of his Stabat Mater were world-scale events, progressing successfully in Naples, Paris, Liège, New York, Chicago and Worcester. A performance of King Roger in Prague on 21 October 1932 directed by Josef Munclingr closely reflected Szymanowski's own idea of the piece, and was a huge success, as was the stage production of Harnasie. A Polish recording of his Symphony No. 4 in 1932 was followed by a series of performances abroad, mostly with Szymanowski at the piano and conducted by Grzegorz Fitelberg. In 1933, the symphony was performed in London, Bologna, Cleveland; Moscow, Zagreb, Bucharest; in 1934 in Paris, Sofia, London; in 1935 in Stockholm, Oslo, Bergen, Berlin, Rome, Liège and Maastricht; and in 1937 in The Hague.

== Recordings ==
In 1994, Charles Dutoit recorded both of Szymanowski's violin concertos with the Montreal Symphony Orchestra. English conductor Sir Simon Rattle has called Szymanowski "one of the greatest composers of this [20th] century" and produced a series of recordings with the Birmingham Symphony Orchestra. In 2004, Scottish violinist Nicola Benedetti won the BBC Young Musician of the Year with a performance of Szymanowski's Violin Concerto No. 1. In 2008, King Roger was performed at Edinburgh International Festival under the baton of Valery Gergiev and the Mariinsky opera company. In 2012, Gergiev led the London Symphony Orchestra's performance of all four of Szymanowski's symphonies at the Edinburgh International Festival. In 2015, King Roger was staged in London's Royal Opera House, produced by Kasper Holten. In the past two decades, Szymanowski's music has enjoyed a revival and been performed around the world. It has been recorded by conductors and musicians such as Pierre Boulez, Edward Gardner, Vladimir Jurowski, Mark Elder and Krystian Zimerman.

== Remembrance ==
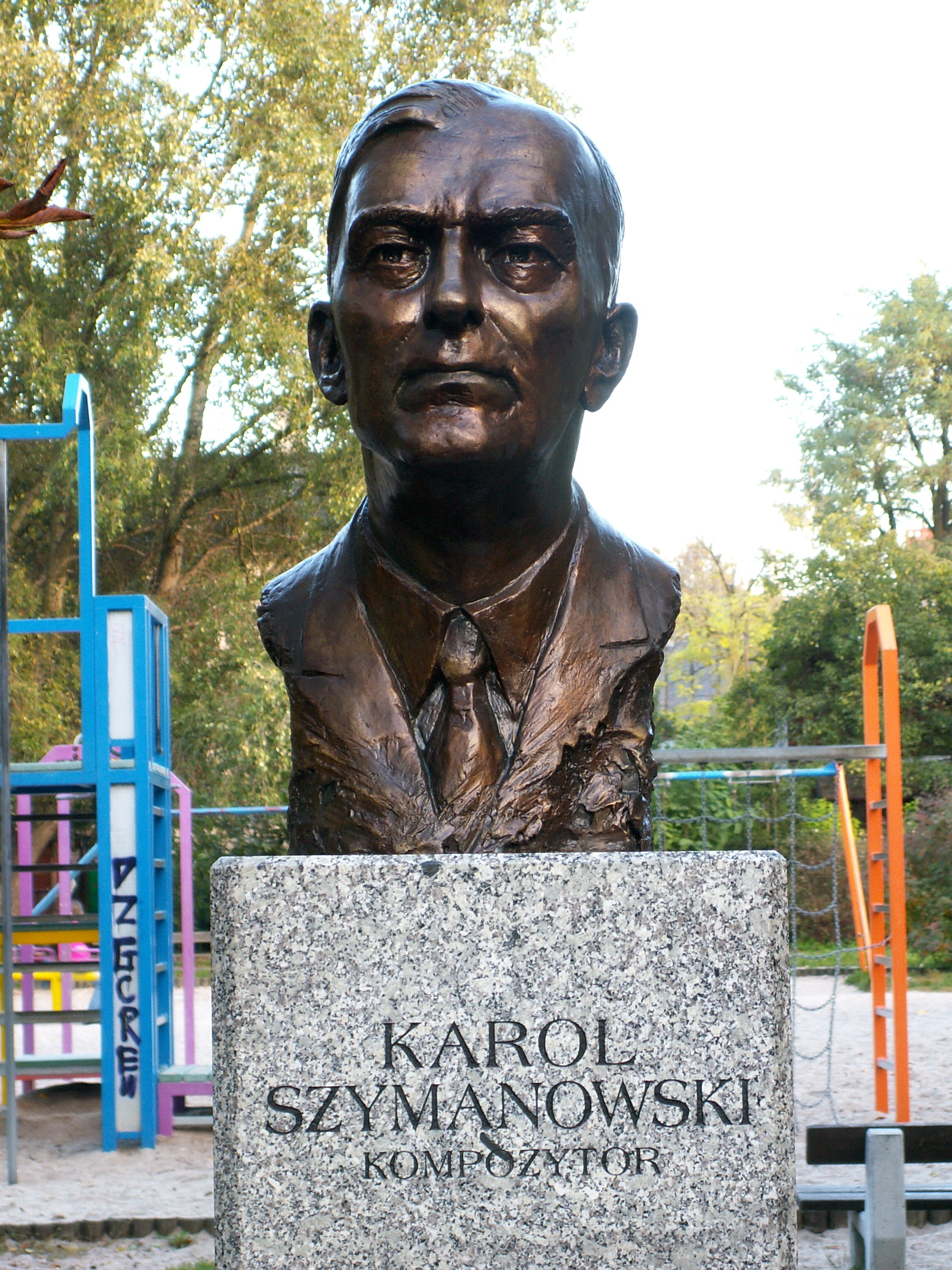
Bust of Szymanowski in Kielce

Szymanowski received numerous awards, including the Officer Cross of the Order of Polonia Restituta; the Officer of the Order of the Crown of Italy; the Commander of the Order of the Crown of Italy; the Knight of Legion d'Honneur; an honorary plaque at the Accademia Nazionale di Santa Cecilia; the Commander Cross of the Order of Polonia Restituta; and the Academic Golden Laurel of the Polish Academy of Literature, Order of Merit of the Republic of Poland. He was also a Doctor Honoris Causa of the Jagiellonian University, Kraków and an honorary member of the Czech Academy of Learning, the Latvian Conservatory of Music in Riga, the St Cecilia Royal Academy in Rome, the Royal Academy of Music in Belgrade, and the International Society for Contemporary Music.

On 16 November 2006, the Polish Parliament passed a resolution to name 2007 "The Year of Karol Szymanowski" to honour the 125th anniversary of his birth and the 70th anniversary of his death. On 3 October 2007, the National Bank of Poland issued special commemorative coins depicting Szymanowski in the following denominations: zl 200, zl 10 zloty and zl 2. The Karol Szymanowski Academy of Music in Katowice and the Kraków Philharmonic are both named for him. On 11 November 2018, to commemorate the 100th anniversary of the regaining of Polish independence, President Andrzej Duda posthumously awarded Szymanowski and 24 other distinguished Poles Poland's highest decoration, the Order of the White Eagle. Szymanowski inspired the character of composer Edgar Szyller in Jarosław Iwaszkiewicz's novel Fame and Glory (Polish: Sława i chwała).

On 3 October 2023, Szymanowski was celebrated with a Google Doodle for his 141st birthday.

== Awards and decorations ==
- Order of the White Eagle (posthumously, 2018)
- Grand Cross of the Order of Polonia Restituta (posthumously, 2 April 1937)
- Commander's Cross of the Order of Polonia Restituta (11 November 1934)
- Officer's Cross of the Order of Polonia Restituta (30 April 1925)
- Gold Cross of Merit (5 May 1931)
- Gold Academic Laurel (5 November 1935)
- Commander of the Order of St. Sava (Yugoslavia)
- Commander of the Order of the Crown of Italy (Italy)
- Officer of the Order of the Crown of Italy (Italy)
- Chevalier of the Legion of Honour (France)
- Order of Cultural Merit (Romania)

== See also ==
- List of Polish composers
- List of Polish people
- Music of Poland

== Additional sources ==
In English

- Jim Samson, Music in Transition: A Study of Tonal Expansion and Atonality, 1900–1920, New York: W.W. Norton & Company, 1977, ISBN 0-393-02193-9
- Jim Samson, The Music of Szymanowski, London: Kahn & Averill, 1980, ISBN 0-900707-58-5
- Alistair Wightman, Karol Szymanowski. His Life and Work, Alderhost, Ashgate Publishing Company, 1999
- Christopher Palmer, Szymanowski. BBC Music Guides, 1983 (An introduction to Szymanowski's music in English)
- Paul Cadrin & Stephen Downes, ed. The Szymanowski companion, Farnham, Surrey: Ashgate, 2015 ISBN 978-1-4724-5557-4

In French

- Patrick Szersnovicz, Olivier Bellamy, Piotr Anderszewski, "Karol Szymanowski: le génie méconnu" (Karol Szymanowski: unknown genius) in Le Monde de la musique, No 299, June 2005, p. 46-59
- Didier Van Moere, Karol Szymanowski, Fayard, Paris 2008.
- Anetta Floirat, Karol Szymanowski à la rencontre des arts, Sampzon, Delatour France, 2019, 338 p.

In German

- Roger Scruton and Petra Weber-Borckholdt, eds., Szymanowski in seiner Zeit (Szymanowski in his time), Munich, Wilhelm Fink Verlag, 1984
- Danuta Gwizdalanka: Der Verführer. Karol Szymanowski und seine Musik, Harrassowitz Verlag, Wiesbaden 2017, ISBN 978-3-447-10888-1

In Italian

- Alessandro Martinisi, Il sogno sognato di Karol Szymanowski. Re Ruggero tra luce ed ombra., Quintessenza Editrice, Gallarate 2009, ISBN 978-88-901794-2-6
- Aldo Dotto, Le Maschere di Karol Szymanowski, (prefazione di Joanna Domanska) Edizioni ETS, 2014, ISBN 9788846740861

In Polish

- Stefania Łobaczewska, Karol Szymanowski. Zycie i twórczość (Karol Szymanowski. Life and work) Cracow, PWM, 1950
- Zygmunt Sierpiński, O Karolu Szymanowskim (About Karol Szymanowski), Warsaw, Interpress, 1983
- Tadeusz Zieliński, Szymanowski : Liryka i ekstaza (Szymanowski: Lyric and ecstasy), Cracow, Polskie Wydawnictwo Muzyczne, 1997
- Teresa Chylińska, Karol Szymanowski i jego epoka (Karol Szymanowski and his time), Cracow, Musica Iagellonica, 2006, 3 volumes
- Mortkowicz-Olczakowa, Hanna (1961). Bunt wspomnień. Państwowy Instytut Wydawniczy
- Jerzy Maria Smoter (collective) Karol Szymanowski we wspomnieniach (Karol Szymanowski in our memory), Cracow, PWM, 1974, 394 p.
- Łozińska Hempel, Maria (1986). Z łańcucha wspomnień. Wydawnictwo Literackie.
