= Alan Feinberg =

American classical pianist

Alan Feinberg (born in New York City) is an American classical pianist. He has premiered over 300 works by such composers as John Adams, Milton Babbitt, John Harbison, Charles Ives, Steve Reich, and Charles Wuorinen, as well as the premiere of Mel Powell's Pulitzer Prize winning Duplicates. He is an experienced performer of both classical and contemporary music and is well known for recitals that pair old and new music.

== Musical career ==
Feinberg toured several times with The Cleveland Orchestra and Christoph von Dohnanyi, first performing Shulamit Ran's Concert Piece (including an appearance in Carnegie Hall). He also performed the Brahms Second Piano Concerto on tour with The Cleveland Orchestra and participated in a collaboration with The Cleveland Orchestra which featured the world premiere of the recently discovered Emerson Concerto by composer Charles Ives (performed also in London, Paris, and Amsterdam), and subsequently recorded the work.

He was featured on opening night of the San Francisco Symphony's Maverick Festival, at the New Horizons Festival of the New York Philharmonic, the 10th Anniversary Celebration of the American Composers Orchestra, the 92nd Street Y's Berio Sequenza Marathon, the first performance of John Adams' Nixon in China for the Guggenheim's Works in Progress Series, and Carnegie Hall's Birthday celebration of the music of George Gershwin with Dick Hyman.

Feinberg has performed as a soloist with the Chicago Symphony, The Cleveland Orchestra, the New York Philharmonic, the London Philharmonia, the Montreal Symphony, the Los Angeles Philharmonic, the BBC Scottish, the American Symphony Orchestra, the St. Louis Symphony, the Baltimore Symphony, the New World Symphony, and many others.

Feinberg has recorded four solo CDs for London/Decca that survey American music: The American Romantic, The American Virtuoso, The American Innovator, and Fascinatin' Rhythm—American Syncopation. He has received Grammy Nominations for recordings of the Babbitt "Piano Concerto" (New World Records), Morton Feldman's "Palais di Mari", and Charles Wuorinen's "Capriccio", "Bagatelle", and "Third Sonata". He has additionally recorded piano concertos by Mel Powell, Andrew Imbrie, Kamran Ince, Paul Bowles, Amy Beach, Charles Ives, Leo Ornstein, Samuel Adler, Don Gilles, and Robert Helps, as well as a Decca CD of vocal works of Charles Ives with soprano Susan Narucki and a recording of Morton Feldman's "Piano and Orchestra with Michael Tilson Thomas and the New World Symphony. He received his fourth Grammy nomination for "Best Instrumentalist with Orchestra" for his recording of the Amy Beach "Piano Concerto" with the Nashville Symphony (Naxos). Other recordings can be found on New World Records, CRI, Harmonia Mundi, Bridge, New Albion and Naxos.

He has received five Grammy nominations throughout his career.

Recent recital programs have highlighted his interest in bridging the old and the new; these include a program of Bach and Ustvolskaya, "Reconsidering Haydn" (works of Haydn, Schubert, Weir and Kagel), "Basically Bull", a program featuring works of John Bull, William Byrd, Orlando Gibbons, Thomas Morley, and Charles Wuorinen. In recent years Mr. Feinberg has taken on work as a programmer and presenter. He has been the Artistic Advisor for the "Chautauqua Days" Festival in Castine, Maine and Music Director of the Monadnock Music Festival. He has acted as a programming consultant for the Lincoln Center Chamber Music Society's American festival. He has put together programs of American music with himself and other American performers for the White Nights Festival in St. Petersburg and for a series of four concerts in Moscow.

Feinberg has also performed many times abroad. He has appeared as a concerto soloist at The Proms in England, with the Cleveland Orchestra in Paris, with the Amsterdam Radio Orchestra in Holland, with the Montreal Symphony, and with the various BBC orchestras. He has given recitals at Wigmore Hall in London, appeared at festivals in Edinburgh, Bath, Huddersfield, Geneva, Budapest, Berlin, Brescia, Bergamo, and Tokyo. He was also the first pianist to have been invited by the Union of Soviet Composers to represent American contemporary music, an invitation which resulted in performances in both Moscow and Leningrad.

Feinberg also has considerable experience as a teacher, and has taught at SUNY Buffalo, The Juilliard School, Eastman School of Music, Oberlin Conservatory, Carnegie Mellon, Duke, and Princeton Universities.

== Early life ==
Feinberg received his Bachelor of Music in 1972 and his Master of Music in 1973 from The Juilliard School in New York City with the piano professor Mieczyslaw Munz. He began D.M.A. studies and worked with Robert Helps at the Manhattan School of Music.

== Personal life ==
Feinberg lives in New York City with his wife and has two children.

== Awards and Recognitions ==
Beach Piano Concerto (Naxos 2003) Nomination for Grammy Award for Best Instrumentalist with Orchestra.

Wuorinen/Feldman (Koch International 1997) Nomination for Grammy Award for Best Instrumentalist.

The American Innovator (London/Argo 1995) Nomination for Grammy Award as Best Instrumentalist.

The American Innovator (London/Argo 1995) Most Creative Programming Award CD Magazine.

The American Romantic (London/Argo 1992) Nomination for Grammy Award for Best Instrumentalist.

Milton Babbitt Piano Concerto (New World Records 1987) Nomination for Grammy Award, Best Contemporary Music Record by Opus Magazine, Best Records of the Year in London Times, Picks of the Year, The Village Voice.

Mel Powell Duplicates for Two Pianos and Orchestra--Pulitzer Prize Winner

The Waltz Project (Nonesuch Records) Critics Choice, High Fidelity 1984

National Endowment for the Arts, Solo Recitalist Grant

Prize Winner, First Rockefeller American Music Competition Certificate Winner, Geneva International Competition

== Discography ==
The American Romantic --- Argo/ Decca

The American Virtuoso --- Argo/ Decca

The American Innovator --- Argo/ Decca

Fascinating Rhythm: American Syncopation --- Argo/ Decca

Wuorinen piano works --- Col Legno

Babbitt piano works --- CRI

Wuorinen/ Feldman --- Koch

The Waltz Project ---Nonesuch

Charles Dodge, Any Resemblance is Coincidental ---New Albion

Beach Piano Concerto with Nashville Symphony --- Naxos

Ives: Emerson Concerto with National Symphony Orchestra of Ireland --- Naxos

Adams and Reich with I Solisti --- EMI

Babbitt: Piano Concerto with American Composers Orchestra--- New World Records

Adler Piano Concerto #2 --- Troy Records

Feldman: Piano and Orchestra with New World Symphony ---Argo/Decca

Robert Helps: Concerto #2 with Albany Symphony --- Albany Records

Don Gilles Piano Concerto with Albany Symphony --- Albany Records

Mel Powell Duplicates with the LA Philharmnic --- Harmonia Mundi

Andrew Imbrie Concerto #3 --- Bridge Records

Kamran Ince Remembering Lycia with the Albany Symphony ---Argo/Decca

Paul Bowles Concerto for 2 Pianos with Eos --- Catalyst

Ligeti Horn Trio --- Bridge

Wuorinen Trios --- Koch

Babbitt Sextets and The Joy of More Sextets --- New World Records

Music of Claudio Spies --- CRI

Music of Stephen Dembski --- CRI

Music of William Bland --- Bridge

Ornstein Violin Sonata --- New World Records

Ernst Bacon Violin Sonata --- CRI

Jonathan Dawe, Horn Trio --- Furious Artisans

Extraordinary Vistas-words and music of the MacDowell Colony with Susan Narucki --- Americus Records

Wuorinen Fenton Songs II --- Naxos
