= USS Bass =

Two submarines of the United States Navy have been named Bass after the spiny-finned fish.

- USS Bass (SF-5)
- USS Bass (SSK-2)

== See also ==
- USS Horace A. Bass (APD-124)
