= Bass River =

Bass River may refer to:

== Australia ==
- Bass River (Victoria), a relatively short coastal river

== Canada ==
- Bass River, Nova Scotia, an unincorporated rural community in Colchester County and small river therein located
- Bass River, Kent County, an unincorporated rural community in Weldford Parish, Kent County, New Brunswick
- Little Bass River, Nova Scotia

== United States ==
- Bass River (Michigan), a tributary of the Grand River in Ottawa County
- Bass River (Massachusetts), an estuary and village in South Yarmouth, Massachusetts, United States
- Bass River (New Jersey), a tributary of the Mullica River
- Bass River Township, New Jersey

== See also ==
- Bass (disambiguation)
