= Bass, Casey County, Kentucky =

Bass
- Unincorporated community
- Location within the state of Kentucky Bass (the United States)
- Coordinates: 37°20′19″N 85°8′41″W
- Country: United States
- State: Kentucky
- County: Casey
- Elevation: 1,004 ft (306 m)
- Time zone: UTC-6 (Central (CST))
  - Summer (DST): UTC-5 (CST)
- GNIS feature ID: 507460

Bass is an unincorporated community in Casey County, Kentucky, United States.
