= Bass Lake (Mahnomen County, Minnesota) =

Lake in the state of Minnesota, United States

- Location within Minnesota
- Location: Mahnomen County, Minnesota
- Coordinates: 47°13′34″N 95°35′15″W
- Type: Lake
- Surface elevation: 1,588 feet (484 m)

Bass Lake is a lake in Mahnomen County, in the U.S. state of Minnesota.

Bass Lake was named for the bass fish.

== See also ==
- List of lakes in Minnesota
