= Bass Lake (Faribault County, Minnesota) =

Lake of the United States of America

- Location within Minnesota
- Location: Faribault County, Minnesota
- Coordinates: 43°49′9″N 94°4′45″W
- Type: Lake
- Surface elevation: 1,030 feet (310 m)

Bass Lake is a lake in Faribault County, in the U.S. state of Minnesota.

Bass Lake is well-stocked with bass fish, hence the name.

== See also ==
- List of lakes in Minnesota
