= Bassline (disambiguation) =

Bassline is the music term for the low-pitched instrumental part or line played by a rhythm section instrument.

Bassline may also refer to:

- Bassline (music genre), a type of music related to UK garage
- "Bassline" (Chris Brown song), 2012
- "Bassline" (Reverend and The Makers song)
- The Bassline (club), a music venue in Johannesburg, South Africa
