= Métopes =

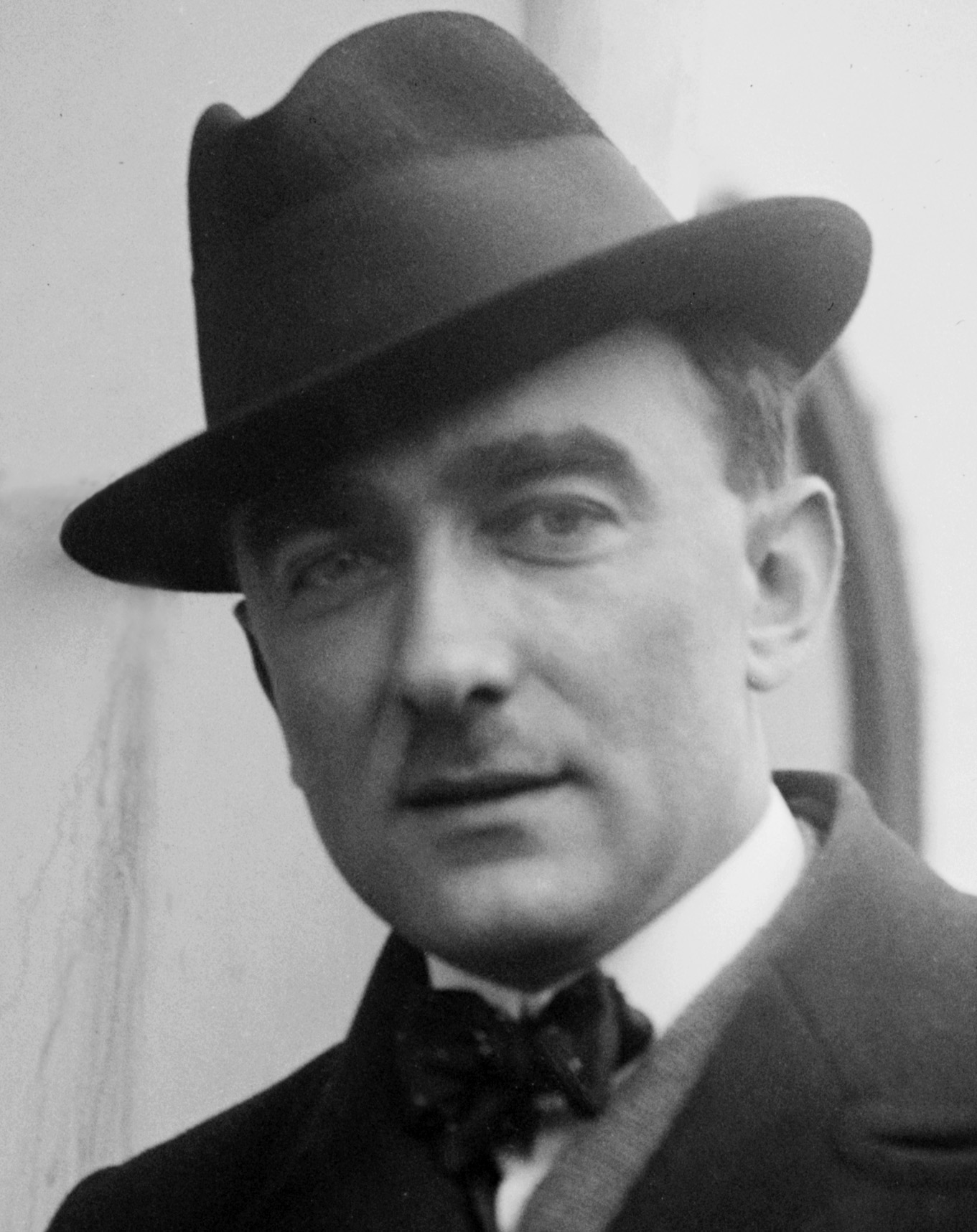
Karol Szymanowski in 1922

Métopes, Op. 29, is a work for piano solo by the Polish composer Karol Szymanowski, completed in 1915. It is a suite of three miniature tone poems drawing on Greek mythology.

Each of the three movements features a female character encountered by Odysseus on his homeward voyage. The movements are:

1. "The Isle of the Sirens"
2. "Calypso"
3. "Nausicaa"

The work may have been inspired by the metopes of the temple at Selinunte.

The composition is the first of four piano works composed by Szymanowski during the First World War, an intensely productive period for the composer. In style it resembles impressionism and bitonal works by Ravel and Debussy.
