= Choral poetry =

Choral poetry is a type of lyric poetry that was created by the ancient Greeks and performed by choruses (see Greek chorus). Originally, it was accompanied by a lyre, a string instrument like a small U-shaped harp commonly used during Greek classical antiquity and later periods. Other accompanying instruments in later years included other string instruments such as the kithara, barbiton, and phorminx, as well as wind instruments such as the aulos, a double-reeded instrument similar to an oboe.

During public religious festivals and important family functions, performances of archaic choral lyric poetry were often presented by choruses of both men and women. The archaic choral lyric poetry spanned about three hundred years, starting with the poet, Alcman, in the 7th century BCE and evolving to the works of Timotheos (or Timotheus of Miletus) in the 4th century BCE.

In the beginning, choral poetry was mainly religious and the personal elements disappeared completely in later choral poems. It also detached itself from local ties and assumed Hellenic character.

These are commonly known subgenres for choral lyric poetry:

- The marriage song (Epithalamium or Hymenaios)
- The dancing song
- The lament or dirge (Threnos)
- The paean of praise to a god
- The maiden song (Partheneion or Parthenion)
- The processional (Prosodion)
- The hymn
- The dithyramb
- The hyporchema

And in later years:

- Praise for people (Enkomion)
- Song at a party or symposium (Skolion)
- Song about victory in an athletic contest (Epinikion)

== Alcman ==
Alcman was a 7th-century BCE poet who represents the earliest Alexandrian canon of the nine lyric poets. His choral poetry was known only through quotations by other Greek authors until 1855, when a discovery of a papyrus was found in a tomb at the Saqqara ancient burial ground in Egypt. This papyrus, now displayed at the Louvre in Paris, held the fragment with approximately 100 verses of his Partheneion (a poem sung by a chorus of adolescent girls).

Here is an example of choral poetry, from Alcman's Partheneion:

Having devised evil deeds, they suffered [paskhein] in a way that cannot be forgotten.
There is such a thing as retribution from the gods.
Blessed [olbios] is he who, with a sound disposition,
weaves through the time of day
without punishment that makes him weep. And I sing
the radiance of Agido, seeing
her as the sun, which for us
is shown by Agido - she is the eyewitness
to shine [phainein] with its sunlight. But for me to praise [ep-aineîn] her
or to blame [mōmēsthai] her is not allowed by the glorious [kleenna] leader of the chorus [khorēgos = Hagesikhora]

A photo of the papyrus containing Alcman's Partheneion fragment can be seen here: Partheneion fragment on papyrus

Another Ancient Greek lyric poet, named Pindar, justified and exalted choral poetry at a time when society was turning away from it. He was also one of the nine lyric poets (like Alcman), and is said to be the greatest, despite the fact that his work is known to be challenging to read and appreciate.

== The chorus' role in ancient Greek theater ==
In ancient Greek theater, there was typically a Greek chorus that played a significant role which gave the audience more of an understanding of the characters. This was given by providing background information in order for the people to know what the characters were really thinking. As the play progressed, there was collective commentary (spoken or sung) on particular dramatic actions and events. All of the chorus performers (originally consisting of fifty members, then reduced to twelve and fifteen) were masked, looked exactly the same, and spoke at the same time, which created a sense of unity. After the 5th century, the importance of the chorus started to diminish.

During the performance, “strophe, antistrophe and epode were a kind of stanza framed only for the music," as John Milton wrote in the preface to Samson Agonistes, with the strophe chanted by a Greek chorus as it moved from right to left across the scene.
