= Lyric poetry =

Formal type of poetry

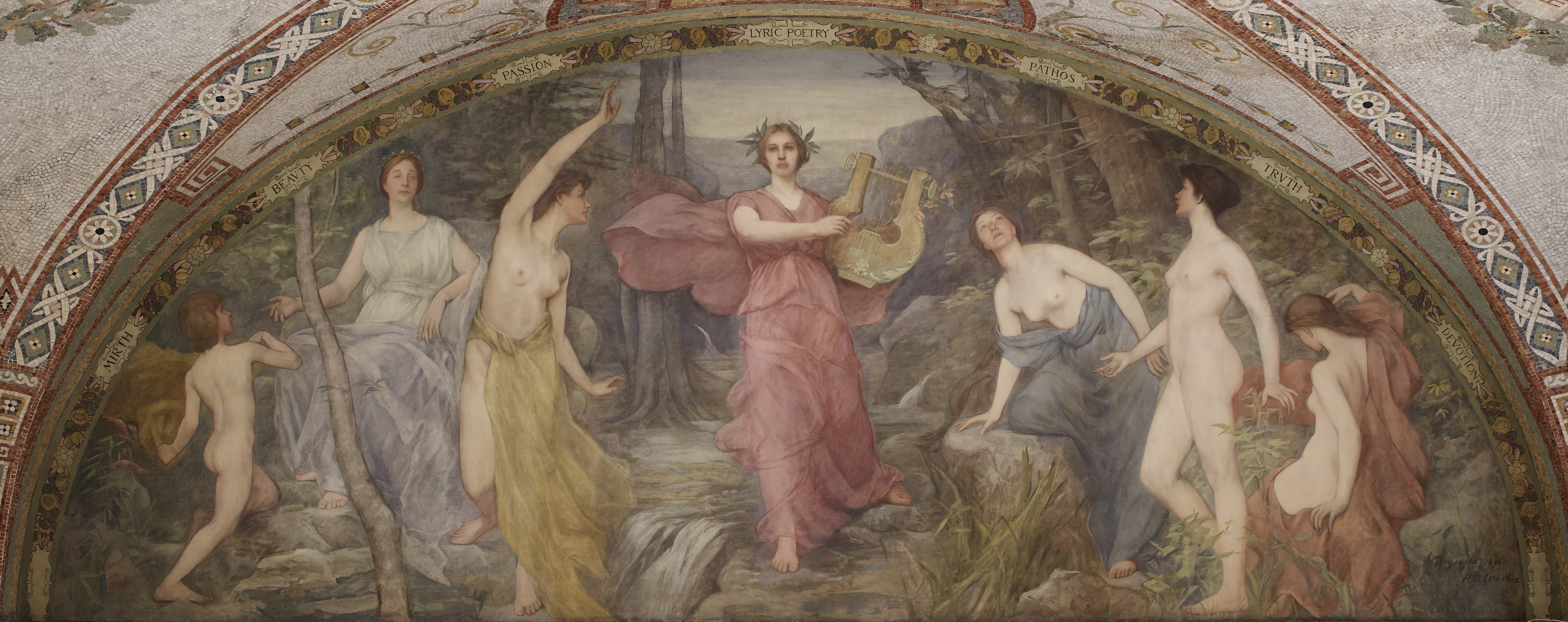
Lyric Poetry (1896) Henry Oliver Walker, in the Library of Congress's Thomas Jefferson Building.

Modern lyric poetry is a formal type of poetry that expresses personal emotions or feelings, typically spoken in a first-person narrative. The term for both modern lyric poetry and modern song lyrics derives from a form of Ancient Greek literature, the Greek lyric, which was defined by its musical accompaniment, usually on an instrument known as a kithara, a professional-grade, seven-stringed lyre (hence "lyric"). These three are not equivalent, though song lyrics are often in the lyric mode and Ancient Greek lyric poetry was principally chanted verse.

The term owes its importance in literary theory to the division developed by Aristotle among three broad categories of poetry: lyrical, dramatic, and epic. Lyric poetry is one of the earliest forms of literature.

== Meters ==
Much lyric poetry depends on regular meter based either on syllable or on stress – two short syllables or one long syllable typically counting as equivalent – which is required for song lyrics in order to match lyrics with interchangeable tunes that followed a standard pattern of rhythm. Although much modern lyric poetry is no longer song lyrics, the rhythmic forms have persisted without the music.

The most common meters are as follows:

- Iambic – two syllables, with the short or unstressed syllable followed by the long or stressed syllable.
- Trochaic – two syllables, with the long or stressed syllable followed by the short or unstressed syllable. In English, this metre is found almost entirely in lyric poetry.
- Pyrrhic – Two unstressed syllables
- Anapestic – three syllables, with the first two short or unstressed and the last long or stressed.
- Dactylic – three syllables, with the first one long or stressed and the other two short or unstressed.
- Spondaic – two syllables, with two successive long or stressed syllables.

Some forms have a combination of meters, often using a different meter for the refrain.

== History ==
=== Antiquity ===
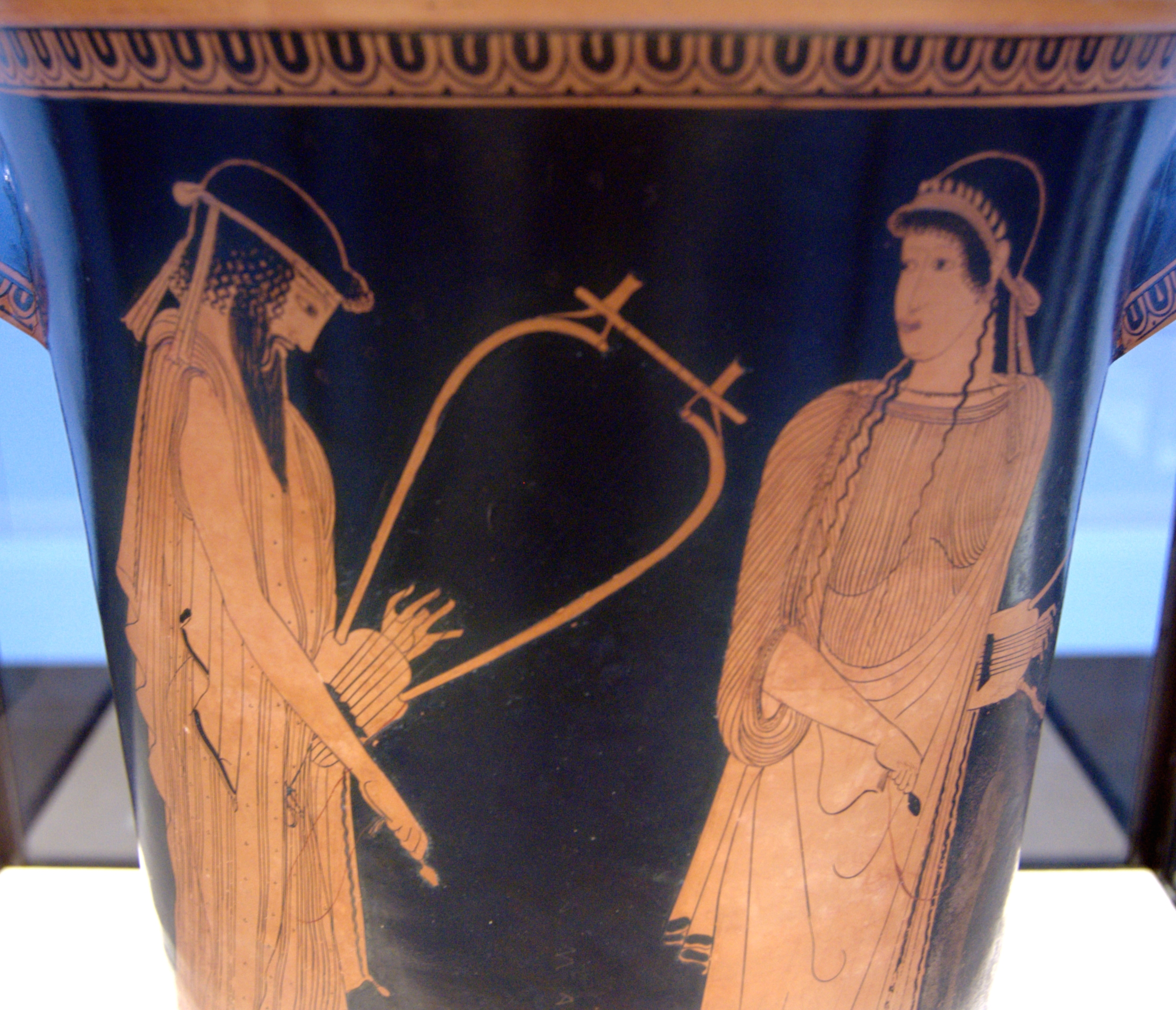
Alcaeus and Sappho depicted on an Attic red-figure calathus c. 470 BC

==== Greece ====
For the ancient Greeks, lyric poetry had a precise technical meaning: Verse that was accompanied by a lyre, cithara, or barbitos. Because such works were typically sung, it was also known as melic poetry. The lyric or melic poet was distinguished from the writer of plays (although Athenian drama included choral odes, in lyric form), the writer of trochaic and iambic verses (which were recited), the writer of elegies (accompanied by the flute, rather than the lyre) and the writer of epic. The scholars of Hellenistic Alexandria created a canon of nine lyric poets deemed especially worthy of critical study. These archaic and classical musician-poets included Sappho, Alcaeus, Anacreon and Pindar. Archaic lyric was characterized by strophic composition and live musical performance. Some poets, like Pindar extended the metrical forms in odes to a triad, including strophe, antistrophe (metrically identical to the strophe) and epode (whose form does not match that of the strophe).

==== Rome ====
Among the major surviving Roman poets of the classical period, only Catullus (Carmina 11, 17, 30, 34, 51, 61) and Horace (Odes) wrote lyric poetry, which was instead read or recited. What remained were the forms, the lyric meters of the Greeks adapted to Latin. Catullus was influenced by both archaic and Hellenistic Greek verse and belonged to a group of Roman poets called the Neoteroi ("New Poets") who spurned epic poetry following the lead of Callimachus. Instead, they composed brief, highly polished poems in various thematic and metrical genres. The Roman love elegies of Tibullus, Propertius, and Ovid (Amores, Heroides), with their personal phrasing and feeling, may be the thematic ancestor of much medieval, Renaissance, Romantic, and modern lyric poetry, but these works were composed in elegiac couplets and so were not lyric poetry in the ancient sense.

==== China ====
During China's Warring States period, the Songs of Chu collected by Qu Yuan and Song Yu defined a new form of poetry that came from the exotic Yangtze Valley, far from the Wei and Yellow River homeland of the traditional four-character verses collected in the Book of Songs. The varying forms of the new Chu Ci provided more rhythm and greater latitude of expression.

=== Medieval verse ===
Originating in 10th century Persian, a ghazal is a poetic form consisting of couplets that share a rhyme and a refrain. Formally, it consists of a short lyric composed in a single meter with a single rhyme throughout. The subject is love. Notable authors include Hafiz, Amir Khusro, Auhadi of Maragheh, Alisher Navoi, Obeid e zakani, Khaqani Shirvani, Anvari, Farid al-Din Attar, Omar Khayyam, and Rudaki. The ghazal was introduced to European poetry in the early 19th century by the Germans Schlegel, Von Hammer-Purgstall, and Goethe, who called Hafiz his "twin".

Lyric in European literature of the medieval or Renaissance period means a poem written so that it could be set to music—whether or not it actually was. A poem's particular structure, function, or theme might all vary. The lyric poetry of Europe in this period was created by the pioneers of courtly poetry and courtly love largely without reference to the classical past. The troubadors, travelling composers and performers of songs, began to flourish towards the end of the 11th century and were often imitated in successive centuries. Trouvères were poet-composers who were roughly contemporary with and influenced by the troubadours but who composed their works in the northern dialects of France. The first known trouvère was Chrétien de Troyes (fl. 1160s–80s). The dominant form of German lyric poetry in the period was the minnesang, "a love lyric based essentially on a fictitious relationship between a knight and his high-born lady". Initially imitating the lyrics of the French troubadours and trouvères, minnesang soon established a distinctive tradition. There was also a large body of medieval Galician-Portuguese lyric.

Hebrew singer-poets of the Middle Ages included Yehuda Halevi, Solomon ibn Gabirol, and Abraham ibn Ezra.

In Italy, Petrarch developed the sonnet form pioneered by Giacomo da Lentini and Dante's Vita Nuova. In 1327, according to the poet, the sight of a woman called Laura in the church of Sainte-Claire d'Avignon awoke in him a lasting passion, celebrated in the Rime sparse ("Scattered rhymes"). Later, Renaissance poets who copied Petrarch's style named this collection of 366 poems Il Canzoniere ("The Song Book"). Laura is in many ways both the culmination of medieval courtly love poetry and the beginning of Renaissance love lyric.

A bhajan or kirtan is a Hindu devotional song. Bhajans are often simple songs in lyrical language expressing emotions of love for the Divine. Notable authors include Kabir, Surdas, and Tulsidas.

Chinese Sanqu poetry was a Chinese poetic genre popular from the 12th-century Jin Dynasty through to the early Ming. Early 14th century playwrights like Ma Zhiyuan and Guan Hanqing were well-established writers of Sanqu. Against the usual tradition of using Classical Chinese, this poetry was composed in the vernacular. (Note: 「抒情性文学…的创作开创了元代理学家诗文创作的先河。」)

=== 16th century ===
In 16th-century Britain, Thomas Campion wrote lute songs and Sir Philip Sidney, Edmund Spenser, and William Shakespeare popularized the sonnet.

In France, La Pléiade, a group including Pierre de Ronsard, Joachim du Bellay, and Jean-Antoine de Baïf, aimed to break with earlier traditions of French poetry, particularly Marot and the grands rhétoriqueurs, and began imitating classical Greek and Roman forms such as the ode. Favorite poets of the school were Pindar, Anacreon, Alcaeus, Horace, and Ovid. They also produced Petrarchan sonnet cycles.

Spanish devotional poetry adapted the lyric for religious purposes. Notable examples were Teresa of Ávila, John of the Cross, Sor Juana Inés de la Cruz, Garcilaso de la Vega, and Lope de Vega. Although better known for his epic Os Lusíadas, Luís de Camões is also considered the greatest Portuguese lyric poet of the period.

In Japan, the naga-uta ("long song") was a lyric poem popular in this era. It alternated five and seven-syllable lines and ended with an extra seven-syllable line.

=== 17th century ===
Lyrical poetry was the dominant form of 17th century English poetry from John Donne to Andrew Marvell. The poems of this period were short. Rarely narrative, they tended towards intense expression. Other notable poets of the era include Ben Jonson, Robert Herrick, George Herbert, Aphra Behn, Thomas Carew, John Suckling, Richard Lovelace, John Milton, Richard Crashaw, and Henry Vaughan. A German lyric poet of the period is Martin Opitz; in Japan, this was the era of the noted haiku-writer Matsuo Bashō.

=== 18th century ===
In the 18th century, lyric poetry declined in England and France. The atmosphere of literary discussion in the English coffeehouses and French salons was not congenial to lyric poetry. Exceptions include the lyrics of Robert Burns, William Cowper, Thomas Gray, and Oliver Goldsmith. German lyric poets of the period include Johann Wolfgang von Goethe, Novalis, Friedrich Schiller, and Johann Heinrich Voß. Kobayashi Issa was a Japanese lyric poet during this period. In Diderot's Encyclopédie, Louis chevalier de Jaucourt described lyric poetry of the time as "a type of poetry totally devoted to sentiment; that's its substance, its essential object".

=== 19th century ===
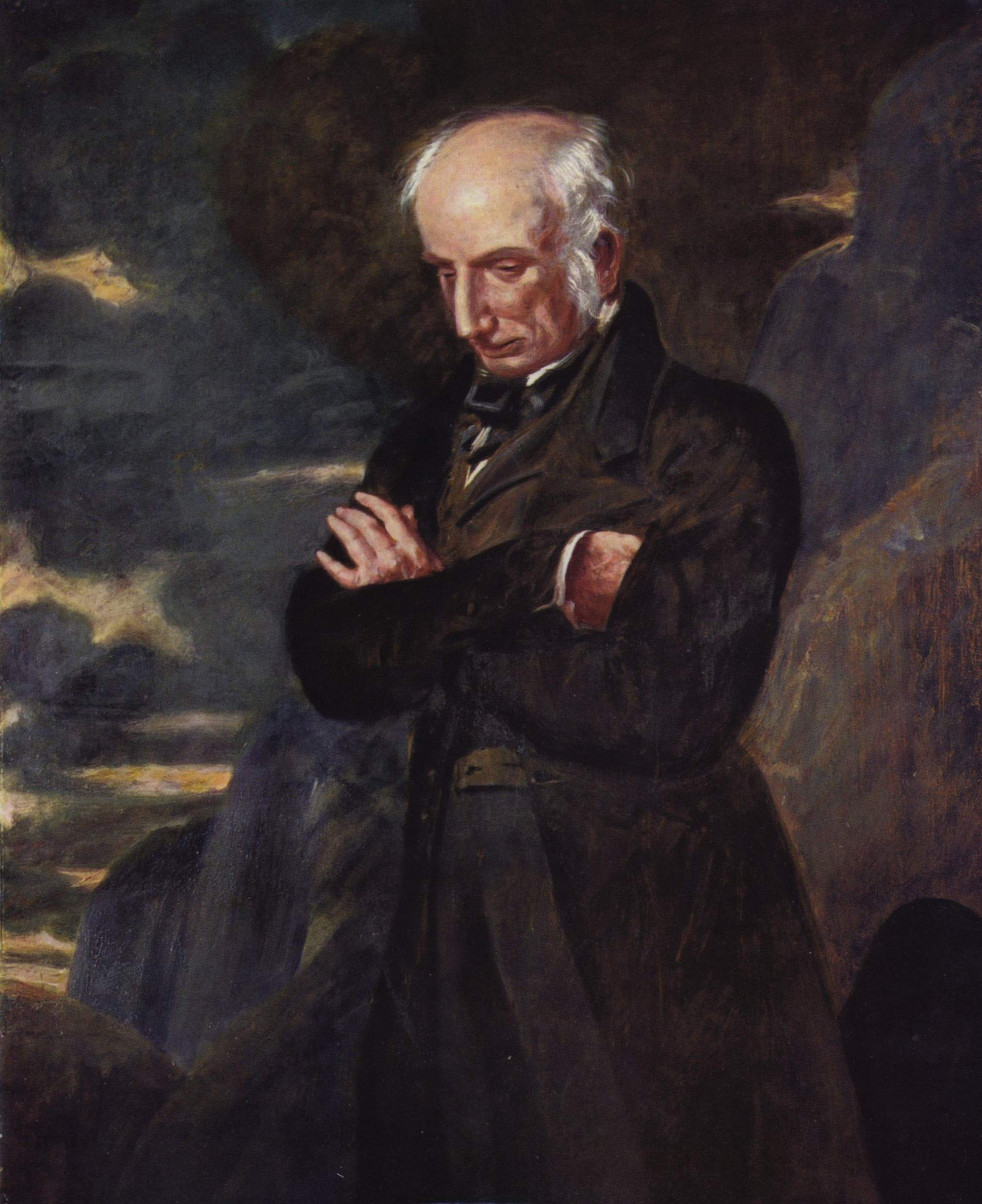
Benjamin Haydon's 1842 portrait of William Wordsworth.

In Europe, the lyric emerged as the principal poetic form of the 19th century and came to be seen as synonymous with poetry. Romantic lyric poetry consisted of first-person accounts of the thoughts and feelings of a specific moment; the feelings were extreme but personal.

The traditional sonnet was revived in Britain, with William Wordsworth writing more sonnets than any other British poet. Other important Romantic lyric writers of the period include Samuel Taylor Coleridge, John Keats, Percy Bysshe Shelley, and Lord Byron. Later in the century, the Victorian lyric was more linguistically self-conscious and defensive than the Romantic forms had been. Such Victorian lyric poets include Alfred Lord Tennyson and Christina Rossetti.

Lyric poetry was popular with the German reading public between 1830 and 1890, as shown in the number of poetry anthologies published in the period. According to Georg Lukács, the verse of Joseph von Eichendorff exemplified the German Romantic revival of the folk-song tradition initiated by Goethe, Herder, and Arnim and Brentano's Des Knaben Wunderhorn.

France also saw a revival of the lyric voice during the 19th century. The lyric became the dominant mode of French poetry during this period. For Walter Benjamin, Charles Baudelaire was the last example of lyric poetry "successful on a mass scale" in Europe.

In Russia, Aleksandr Pushkin exemplified a rise of lyric poetry during the 18th and early 19th centuries. The Swedish "Phosphorists" were influenced by the Romantic movement and their chief poet Per Daniel Amadeus Atterbom produced many lyric poems. Italian lyric poets of the period include Ugo Foscolo, Giacomo Leopardi, Giovanni Pascoli, and Gabriele D'Annunzio. Spanish lyric poets include Gustavo Adolfo Bécquer, Rosalía de Castro, and José de Espronceda. Catalan lyric poets include Jacint Verdaguer, and Miquel Costa i Llobera. Japanese lyric poets include Taneda Santoka, Masaoka Shiki, and Ishikawa Takuboku.

=== 20th century ===
In the earlier years of the 20th century rhymed lyric poetry, usually expressing the feelings of the poet, was the dominant poetic form in the United States, Europe, and the British colonies. The English Georgian poets and their contemporaries such as A. E. Housman, Walter de la Mare, and Edmund Blunden used the lyric form. The Bengali poet Rabindranath Tagore was praised by William Butler Yeats for his lyric poetry; Yeats compared him to the troubadour poets when the two met in 1912.

The relevance and acceptability of the lyric in the modern age was, though, called into question by modernist poets such as Ezra Pound, T. S. Eliot, H.D., and William Carlos Williams, who rejected the English lyric form of the 19th century, feeling that it relied too heavily on melodious language, rather than complexity of thought.

After World War II, the American New Criticism returned to the lyric, advocating a poetry that made conventional use of rhyme, meter, and stanzas, and was modestly personal in the lyric tradition.

Lyric poetry dealing with relationships, sex, and domestic life constituted the new mainstream of American poetry in the middle of the 20th century, following such movements as the confessional poets of the 1950s and 1960s, who included Sylvia Plath and Anne Sexton. the Black Mountain movement with Robert Creeley, Organic Verse represented by Denise Levertov, Projective verse or "open field" composition as represented by Charles Olson, and also Language Poetry which aimed for extreme minimalism along with numerous other experimental verse movements throughout the remainder of the 20th century, up into today where these questions of what constitutes poetry, lyrical or otherwise, are still being discussed but now in the context of hypertext and multimedia as it is used via the Internet.
