= Nine Lyric Poets =

Group of ancient Greek poets

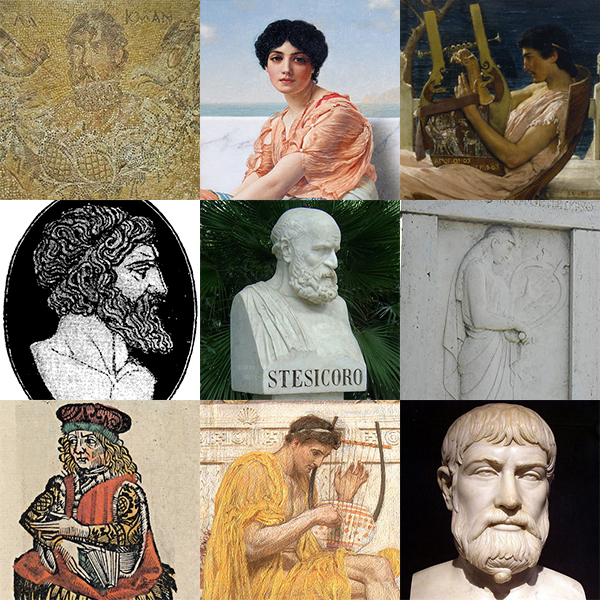
The Nine Lyric Poets. Top, left to right: Alcman, Sappho, Alcaeus; middle: Anacreon, Stesichorus, Ibycus; bottom: Simonides, Bacchylides, Pindar

The Nine Lyric or Melic Poets were a canonical group of ancient Greek poets esteemed by the scholars of Hellenistic Alexandria as worthy of critical study. In the Palatine Anthology it is said that they established lyric song.

They were:

- Alcman of Sparta (choral lyric, 7th century BC)
- Sappho of Mytilene or Eresos of Lesbos (monodic lyric, 7th century BC)
- Alcaeus of Mytilene of Lesbos (monodic lyric, 7th century BC)
- Anacreon of Teos (monodic lyric, 6th century BC)
- Stesichorus of Metauros (choral lyric, 7th century BC)
- Ibycus of Rhegium (choral lyric, 6th century BC)
- Simonides of Ceos (choral lyric, 6th century BC)
- Bacchylides of Ceos (choral lyric, 5th century BC)
- Pindar of Thebes (choral lyric, 5th century BC)

In most Greek sources the word melikos (from melos, "song") is used to refer to these poets, but the variant lyrikos (from lyra, "lyre") became the regular form in both Latin (as lyricus) and in modern languages. The ancient scholars defined the genre on the basis of the musical accompaniment, not the content. Thus, some types of poetry which would be included under the label "lyric poetry" in modern criticism, are excluded—namely, the elegy and iambus which were performed with flutes.

The Nine Lyric Poets are traditionally divided among those who primarily composed choral verses, and those who composed monodic verses. This division is contested by some modern scholars.

Antipater of Thessalonica proposes an alternative canon of nine female poets, which are: Praxilla, Moero, Anyte, Sappho, Erinna, Telesilla, Corinna, Nossis, and Myrtis.

== See also ==
- Greek lyric
