= Melic =

Melic may refer to:

- Melic grass, any of the perennial grasses of the genus Melica
- Melic poetry, ancient Greek lyric accompanied by instruments
