= Ode =

Type of lyric poem

An ode (from Ancient Greek: ᾠδή, romanized: ōidḗ) is a type of lyric poetry, with its origins in Ancient Greece. Odes are elaborately structured poems praising or glorifying an event or individual, describing nature intellectually as well as emotionally. A classic ode is structured in three major parts: the strophe, the antistrophe, and the epode. Different forms such as the homostrophic ode and the irregular ode also enter.

Greek odes were originally poetic pieces performed with musical accompaniment. As time passed on, they gradually became known as personal lyrical compositions whether sung (with or without musical instruments) or merely recited (always with accompaniment). The primary instruments used were the aulos and the lyre (the latter was the most revered instrument to the ancient Greeks).

There are three typical forms of odes: the Pindaric, Horatian, and irregular. Pindaric odes follow the form and style of Pindar. Horatian odes follow conventions of Horace; the odes of Horace deliberately imitated the Greek lyricists such as Alcaeus and Anacreon. Irregular odes use rhyme, but not the three-part form of the Pindaric ode, nor the two- or four-line stanza of the Horatian ode. The ode is a lyric poem. It conveys exalted and inspired emotions. It is a lyric in an elaborate form, expressed in a language that is imaginative, dignified and sincere.

== Structure ==
=== Pindaric Odes ===
Pindaric odes, also called Greek odes, follow the form and style of the Ancient Greek poet Pindar. These employ a tripartite structure, consisting of the strophe, the antistrophe, and the epode.

In Ancient Greece, odes were typically performed on a stage to musical accompaniment. The chorus (or performers of the ode) would deliver the strophe from one side of the stage, then move to the opposite side to deliver the antistrophe, and finally to centerstage for the epode.

This reflects the three-part nature of the ode: the strophe sets up a theme, the antistrophe balances it with a contrary perspective, and the epode summarises.

Pindaric odes do not follow strict metrical conventions, meaning they are often irregular in their rhyme and line length. However, the strophe and antistrophe are typically identical in structure, with the epode varying the form.

William Wordsworth's Ode on Intimations of Immortality from Recollections of Early Childhood (1807) and Thomas Gray's The Progress of Poesy: A Pindaric Ode (1757) are both written in the Pindaric style.

Gray's The Bard: A Pindaric Ode (1757) is a Pindaric ode where the three-part structure is thrice repeated, yielding a longer poem of nine stanzas.

=== Horatian Odes ===
Horatian odes, sometimes called homostrophic odes, follow the conventions of the Roman poet Horace. Unlike the Pindaric ode, the Horatian ode is made up of any number of stanzas (usually quatrains) which all follow the same rhyme scheme and metre.

In contrast with the very formal panegyric style of many of Pindar's odes, Horatian odes often tackle more intimate subjects, such as love and friendship, and were not written for public performance.

Some of the most renowned Horatian odes were written by English Romantic poet John Keats, most famously Ode to a Nightingale (1819).

=== Irregular Odes ===
Irregular odes further break down the ode's formal conventions. They are sometimes called Cowleyan odes after the English Enlightenment poet Abraham Cowley, who revived the form in England with his publication of fifteen Pindarique Odes in 1656. Though this title derives from Pindar, it is a misunderstanding of the Pindaric ode on Cowley's part. In fact, Cowley's odes are very different from the strictly formal Pindaric ode.

In Cowley's poetry, the ode follows an iambic metre, but employs no regular rhyme or line length.

The 'pindarique' was employed by John Milton in the chorus of his lyrical tragedy, Samson Agonistes (1670/71). However, he corrects Cowley's misunderstanding of the form as Pindaric in his 'Preface':

"The measure of verse used in the chorus is of all sorts, called by the Greeks 'monostrophic', or rather 'apolelymenon', without regard had to strophe, antistrophe or epode, which were a kind of stanzas framed only for the music, then used with the chorus that sung; not essential to the poem and therefore not material; or, being divided into stanzas or pauses, they may be called 'alloeostropha'."

== English ode ==
The lyrics can be on various themes. The earliest odes in the English language, using the word in its strict form, were the Epithalamium and Prothalamium of Edmund Spenser.

In the 17th century, the original odes in English were by Abraham Cowley. These were iambic, but had irregular line length patterns and rhyme schemes. Cowley based the principle of his "Pindariques" on an apparent misunderstanding of Pindar's metrical practice but, nonetheless, others widely imitated his style, with notable success by John Dryden.

With Pindar's metre being better understood in the 18th century, the fashion for Pindaric odes faded, though there are notable actual Pindaric odes by Thomas Gray, The Progress of Poesy and The Bard.

Around 1800, William Wordsworth revived Cowley's Pindaric for one of his finest poems, the Intimations of Immortality ode:

There was a time when meadow, grove, and stream,
The earth, and every common sight,
To me did seem
Apparelled in celestial light,
The glory and the freshness of a dream.
It is not now as it hath been of yore;—
Turn wheresoe'er I may,
By night or day,
The things which I have seen I now can see no more....
Our birth is but a sleep and a forgetting:
The Soul that rises with us, our life's Star,
Hath had elsewhere its setting,
And cometh from afar:
Not in entire forgetfulness,
And not in utter nakedness,
But trailing clouds of glory do we come
From God, who is our home...

Others also wrote odes: Samuel Taylor Coleridge, John Keats, and Percy Bysshe Shelley who wrote odes with regular stanza patterns. Shelley's Ode to the West Wind, written in fourteen line terza rima stanzas, is a major poem in the form. Among the most celebrated odes of the 19th century are Keats's Five Great Odes of 1819, which included "Ode to a Nightingale", "Ode on Melancholy", "Ode on a Grecian Urn", "Ode to Psyche", and "To Autumn". After Keats, there have been comparatively few major odes in English. One major exception is the fourth verse of the poem For the Fallen by Laurence Binyon, which is often known as The Ode to the Fallen, or simply as The Ode.

W.H. Auden also wrote Ode, one of the most popular poems from his earlier career when he lived in London, in opposition to people's ignorance over the reality of war. In an interview, Auden once stated that he had intended to title the poem My Silver Age in mockery of England's supposed imperial golden age, however chose Ode as it seemed to provide a more sensitive exploration of warfare.

Ode on a Grecian Urn, while an ekphrasis, also functions as an ode to the artistic beauty the narrator observes. The English ode's most common rhyme scheme is ABABCDECDE. Centuries were occasionally set to music. Composers such as Purcell, Händel and Boyce all set English odes to music.

== Notable practitioners ==
- Álvaro de Campos
- Samuel Taylor Coleridge
- John Donne
- Thomas Gray
- Barbara Hamby
- Horace
- John Keats
- Paul Claudel
- Federico García Lorca
- Thomas Nashe
- Pablo Neruda
- Sharon Olds
- Ronsard
- Percy Bysshe Shelley
- Gary Soto
- George Sterling
- Allen Tate
- William Wordsworth
- Giosuè Carducci

== See also ==
- Epinikion
