= Pindarics =

Class of odes

Pindarics (alternatively Pindariques or Pindaricks) was a term for a class of loose and irregular odes greatly in fashion in England during the close of the 17th and the beginning of the 18th century. Abraham Cowley, who published fifteen Pindarique Odes in 1656, was the poet most identified with the form, though many others had composed irregular verses before him. The term is derived from the name of the ancient Greek poet Pindar, but is based on a misconception since Pindar's odes were in fact very formal, obeying a triadic structure, in which the form of the first stanza (strophe) was repeated in the second stanza (antistrophe), followed by a third stanza (epode) that introduced variations but whose form was repeated by other epodes in subsequent triads. Cowley's Resurrection, which was considered in the 17th century to be a model of the 'pindaric' style, is a formless poem of sixty-four lines, arbitrarily divided, not into triads, but into four stanzas of unequal volume and structure; the lines which form these stanzas are of lengths varying from three feet to seven feet, with rhymes repeated in no order. It was the looseness of these 'pindarics' that appealed to many poets at the close of the 17th century, including John Dryden, Aphra Behn, and Alexander Pope, and many lesser poets, such as John Oldham, Thomas Otway, Thomas Sprat, John Hughes and Thomas Flatman.

John Milton employed 'pindarics' for the chorus of his lyrical tragedy, Samson Agonistes, published in 1670/71 (and probably composed in the 1660s) but he was a classical scholar and he termed them more appropriately:

"The measure of verse used in the chorus is of all sorts, called by the Greeks 'monostrophic', or rather 'apolelymenon', without regard had to strophe, antistrophe or epode, which were a kind of stanzas framed only for the music, then used with the chorus that sung; not essential to the poem and therefore not material; or, being divided into stanzas or pauses, they may be called 'alloeostropha'." (Note: Milton's Preface to Samson Agonistes, where apolelymenon denotes verses free from stanzaic patterns, and alloeostropha denotes strophes or stanzas of varying form—see Douglas Bush (ed), Milton: Poetical Works, Oxford University Press (1966), page 518)

In antiquity, this looser form of choral song was associated with the tragic poet Euripides and other musical innovators of the late fifth-century bce, in contrast to the highly structured odes of the earlier tragedian Aeschylus. Nevertheless, Milton's nephew, Edward Phillips, mistakenly connected this style to Aeschylus:

"...that which we call the pindaric hath a nearer affinity with the monostrophic or apolelymenon used in the chorus's of Aeschylus's tragedies."

Phillips was one of his uncle's pupils and his views may have been shaped by Milton's theories as early as the 1640s yet he also reproduced some of the great poet's later views and his reactions to the literary fashions of the Restoration. Thus he contrasts 'pindarics' with rhyming couplets as a verse form suited to tragedy:

"...that way of versifying which bears the name of Pindaric and which hath no necessity of being divided into strophs or stanzas would be much more suitable for tragedy than the continued rhapsody of rhyming couplets, which whoever shall mark it well will find it appear too stiff and of too much constraint for the liberty of conversation and the interlocution of several persons."

In Discourse on the Pindarique Ode, 1706, the dramatist William Congreve reviled pindarics as "bundles of rambling incoherent thoughts" and "uncertain and perplexed verses and rhymes". Joseph Addison dismissed them in 1711 in the journal The Spectator as monstrous Compositions. Richard Steele in an entry in the Spectator the following year underscored the difference between English pindarics and the verse of Pindar by imagining the Greek poet in Cowley's company—but not for long:

"I saw Pindar walking all alone, no one daring to accost him till Cowley joyn'd himself to him, but, growing weary of one who almost walk'd him out of Breath, he left him for Horace and Anacreon, with whom he seemed infinitely delighted."

The pindaric came to be commonly used for complimentary poems on births, weddings and funerals. Although the vogue of these forms hardly survived the age of Queen Anne, something of the tradition still remained, and even in the odes of Wordsworth, Shelley and Coleridge the broken versification of Cowley's pindarics occasionally survives. Tennyson's Ode on the Death of the Duke of Wellington (1852) may be considered another specimen of a pindaric in English literature, as seen for example in the opening and closing lines:

Bury the Great Duke

With an empire's lamentation,

Let us bury the Great Duke

To the noise of the mourning of a mighty nation,

Mourning when their leaders fall,
Warriors carry the warrior's pall,
And sorrow darkens hamlet and hall...

Ashes to ashes, dust to dust;
He is gone who seem'd so great.
Gone; but nothing can bereave him
Of the force he made his own
Being here, and we believe him
Something far advanced in State,
And that he wears a truer crown
Than any wreath that man can weave him.
Speak no more of his renown,
Lay your earthly fancies down,
And in the vast cathedral leave him,
God accept him, Christ receive him.
