= Praxilla =

Greek lyric poet of the 5th century BC

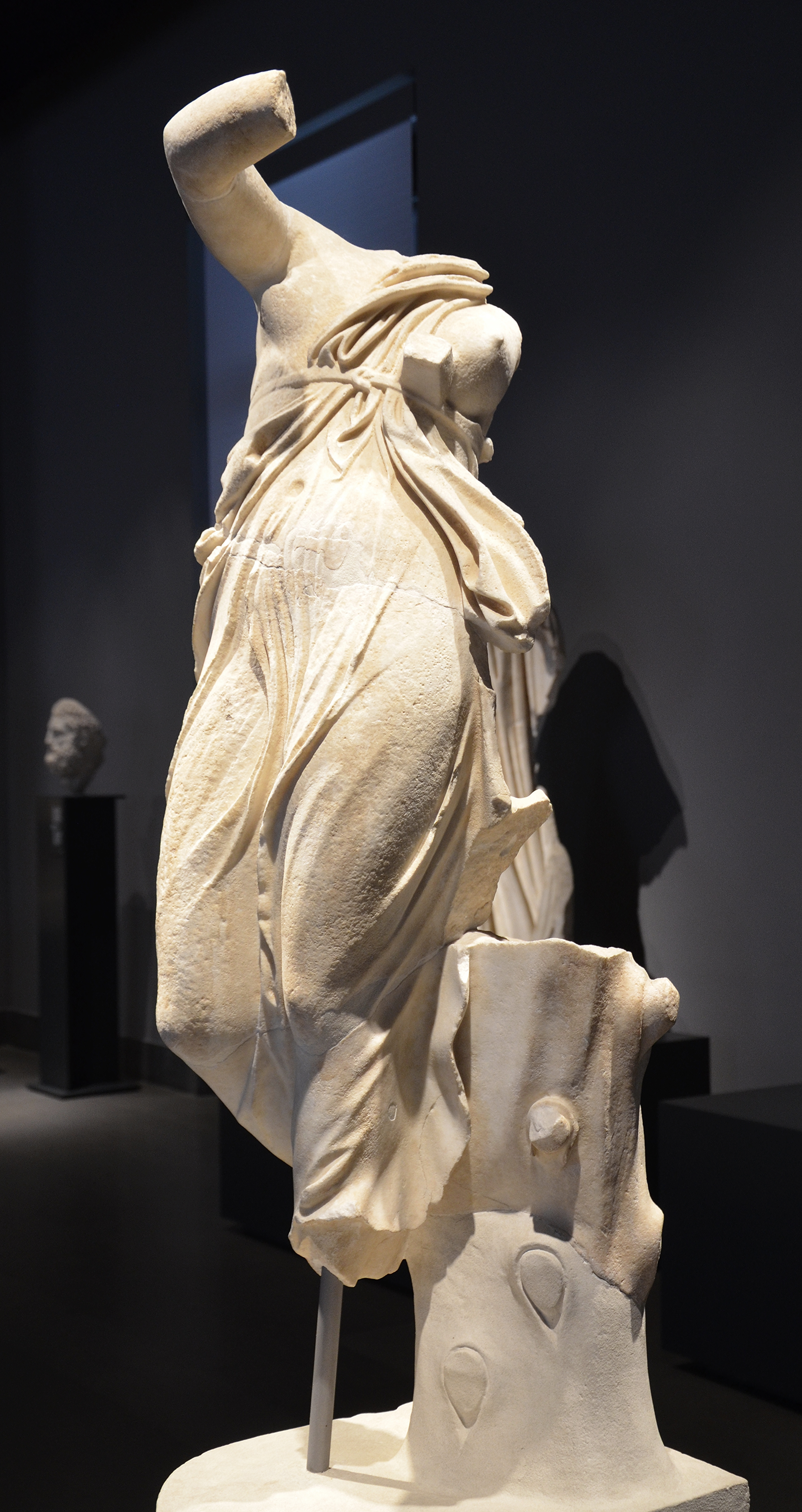
Marble sculpture of a dancing female figure, sometimes identified as Lysippus' sculpture of Praxilla.

Praxilla (Ancient Greek: Πράξιλλα), was a Greek lyric poet of the 5th century BC from Sicyon on the Gulf of Corinth. Five quotations attributed to Praxilla and three paraphrases from her poems survive. The surviving fragments attributed to her come from both religious choral lyric and drinking songs (skolia); the three paraphrases are all versions of myths. Various social contexts have been suggested for Praxilla based on this range of surviving works. These include that Praxilla was a hetaira (courtesan), or that she was a professional musician. Alternatively, the apparent implausibility of a respectable Greek woman writing drinking songs has been explained by suggesting that her poetry was in fact composed by two different authors, or that the drinking songs derive from a non-elite literary tradition rather than being authored by a single writer.

Praxilla was apparently well-known in antiquity: she was sculpted in bronze by Lysippus and parodied by Aristophanes. In the modern world, she has been referenced in artworks by Cy Twombly and Judy Chicago, and one of her poems was adapted by the Irish poet Michael Longley.

== Life ==
Praxilla was from Sicyon on the Gulf of Corinth. In the fourth century AD, the historian Eusebius dated her floruit to 451/450 BC (the second year of the 82nd Olympiad). (Note: Vanessa Cazzato questions the reliability of Eusebius' chronology, noting that Eusebius also names Telesilla and Bacchylides in connection with this year, though both were likely earlier.) No ancient sources give details about Praxilla's life.

== Poetry ==
Little of Praxilla's work survives – five fragments in her own words, and three paraphrases by other authors. The longest surviving fragment is three lines. These vary in style: two are skolia (drinking songs), one is in the metre named the Praxilleion after her, (Note: The Praxilleion is a metre comprising three dactyls followed by a trochaic metron: ‒ ⏑ ⏑ | ‒ ⏑ ⏑ | ‒ ⏑ ⏑ | ‒ ⏑ | ‒ ⏒) one is a hymn to Adonis, and one is a dithyramb. The three works known only in paraphrase are all versions of myths. In the second century AD, Athenaeus reports that Praxilla was particularly known for her skolia. The small amount of Praxilla's work which survives makes it hard for modern critics to judge.

=== Hymn to Adonis ===
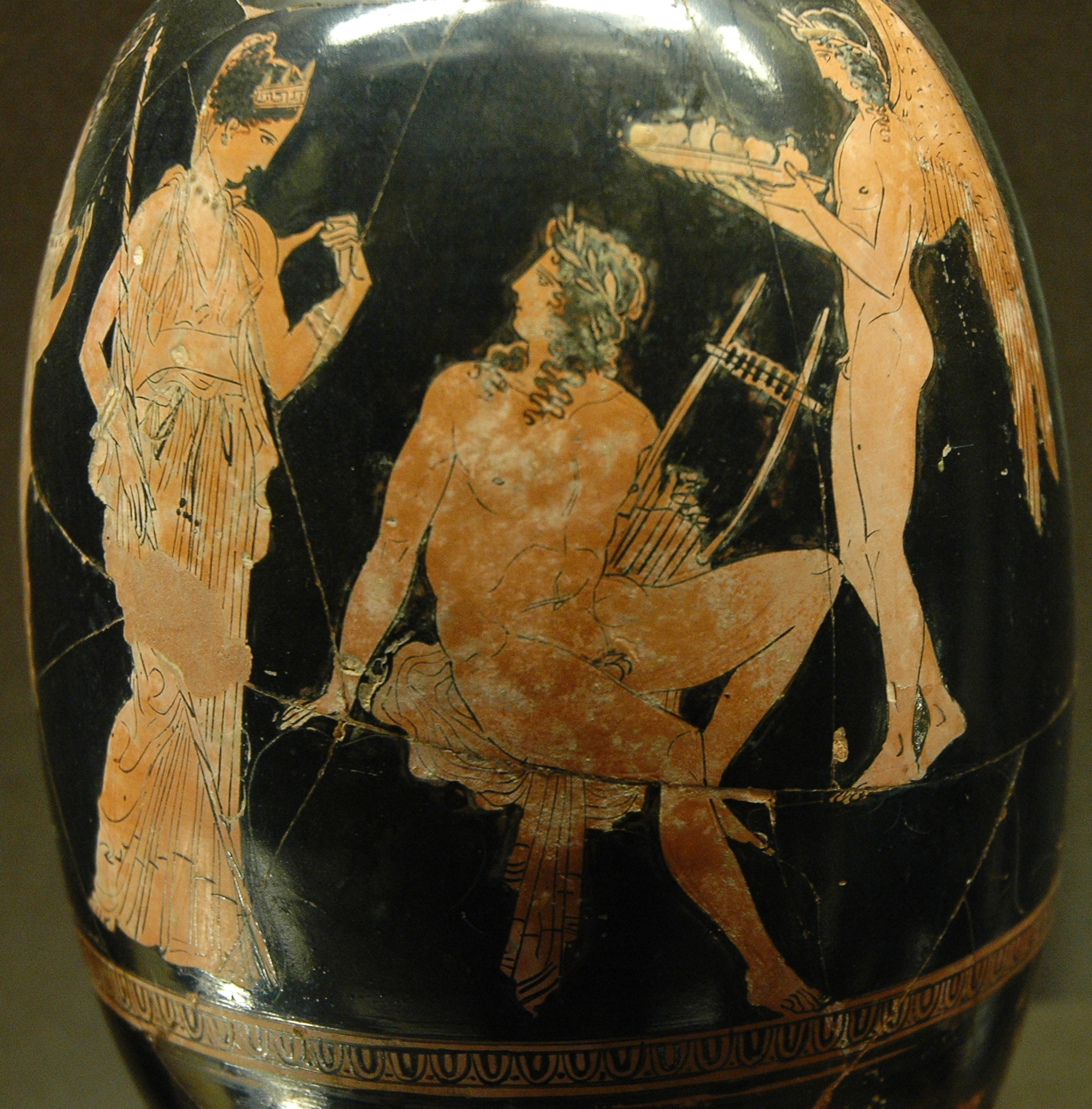
A fifth-century vase depicting Adonis with Aphrodite and Eros

κάλλιστον μὲν ἐγὼ λείπω φάος ἠελίοιο,
δεύτερον ἄστρα φαεινὰ σεληναίης τε πρόσωπον
ἠδὲ καὶ ὡραίους σικύους καὶ μῆλα καὶ ὄγχνας

Translation:

The most beautiful thing I leave behind is the sun's light;
second, the shining stars and the moon's face;
also ripe cucumbers and apples and pears.

Three lines of Praxilla's hexameter hymn to Adonis are quoted by Zenobius. In them, Adonis is asked in the underworld what he will most miss from the mortal world. He replies that he will miss the sun, stars, and moon, cucumbers, (Note: Praxilla's σικύους is usually translated as "cucumbers", but the modern cucumber, Cucumis sativus, was not known in the ancient Mediterranean; Praxilla may have been referring to the snake melon, a variety of true melon which tastes similar to the cucumber.) apples, and pears. Zenobius, a collector of proverbs, quotes the lines to explain the phrase "sillier than Praxilla's Adonis", saying that "anyone who lists cucumbers and the rest alongside sun and moon can only be regarded as feeble-minded".

Maria Panagiotopoulou argues that both the structure of these lines and Praxilla's use of the word kalliston allude to Sappho 16. The reference to cucumbers, apples, and pears may allude to the vegetables used in the Adonia, a festival commemorating the death of Adonis, and the poem may have been performed there. Alternatively as all three vegetables had sexual connotations in ancient Greek literature it may have been performed at symposia. Cucumber, sikyos, may also be a pun on Praxilla's hometown of Sicyon.

=== Praxilleion ===
ὦ διὰ τᾶς θυρίδος καλὸν ἐμβλέποισα
παρτένε τὰν κεφαλὰν τὰ δ' ἔνερθε νύμφα

Translation:

You who look so beautifully in through the window,
with a virgin's head but a married woman's body beneath...

Praxilla was believed to have invented a metre called the Praxilleion, which according to the Byzantine grammarian Trichas she used frequently. A couplet quoted by Hephaestion to illustrate the metre is attributed to her on that basis. This fragment is usually thought to have been from a skolion, and commonly interpreted as being about a prostitute or hetaira. More recently, Vanessa Cazzato has argued that it is in fact a wedding song.

=== Skolia ===
Two of the skolia quoted by Athenaeus, who associates Praxilla with this genre, are attributed to her by other sources. Because respectable women in classical Greece would normally have been excluded from the parties where such songs were performed, there has been some scholarly debate about her social position. Martin Litchfield West suggests that there were two Praxillas, one writing the skolia; the other, the more "respectable" choral songs and hymns. Other scholars have argued that, based on the attribution of skolia to Praxilla, she must have been a hetaira, though Jane McIntosh Snyder notes that there is no external evidence for this thesis. Ian Plant suggests the alternative hypothesis that she was a professional musician, composing songs for symposia because there was a market for such works.

Alternatively, West suggests that the skolia were not written by Praxilla at all. Gregory Jones agrees, and argues that all of the surviving skolia attributed to particular poets are in fact derived from a non-elite oral literary tradition. Marchinus Van der Valk, who also endorses this theory, allows for the possibility that some skolia were "derived from" Praxilla's poetry and published in antiquity attributed to her.

=== Dithyramb to Achilles ===
ἀλλὰ τεὸν οὔποτε θυμὸν ἐνὶ στήθεσσιν ἔπειθον

Translation:

but they never persuaded the heart in your breast.

A single line of a dithyramb titled "Achilles" is quoted by Hephaestion to illustrate an unusual metrical feature, the synizesis of the two vowels in τεὸν. The surviving text of this poem seems to refer to Achilles' anger at Agamemnon which leads to the events of Homer's Iliad.

== Reception ==
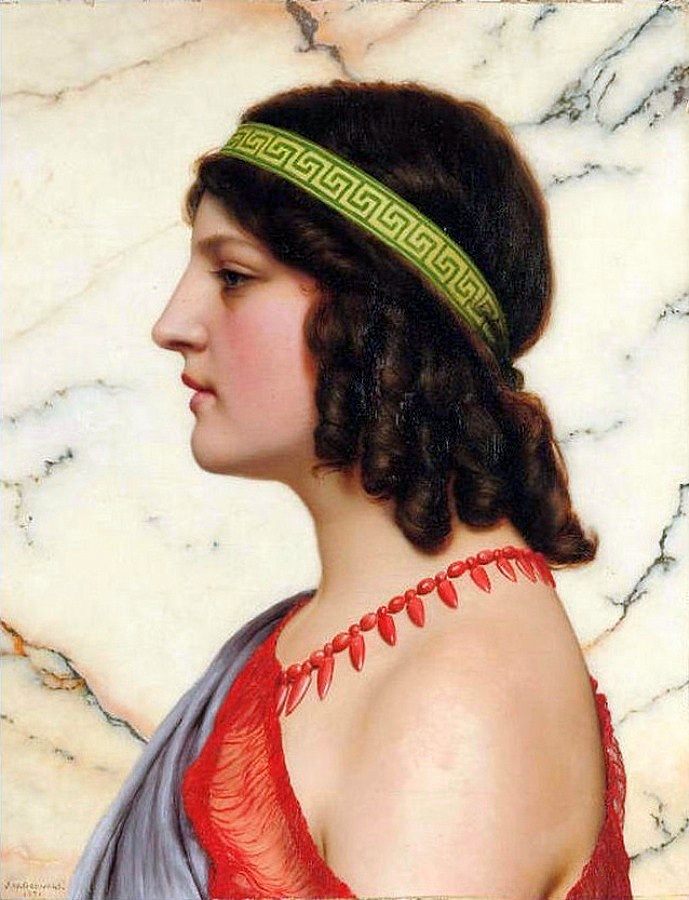
Neo-classical painting of Praxilla by John William Godward, 1922.

Praxilla was well regarded in antiquity. Antipater of Thessalonica lists her first among his canon of nine "immortal-tongued" women poets, and the sculptor Lysippus (also from Sicyon) sculpted her in bronze. She was sufficiently well-known in classical Athens that two of Aristophanes' surviving plays (The Wasps and Thesmophoriazusae) parody her work, and part of one of her poems is inscribed on a red-figure cup dating to about 470 BC. (Note: Though Vanessa Cazzato argues that the association of the inscription with Praxilla's poem is not as certain as many scholars suggest.) Her poetry was still remembered many centuries after her death: the Hellenistic epigrammatist Asclepiades imitated one of her poems; in the second century AD, her name was remembered in the proverb "sillier than Praxilla's Adonis", and the author Tatian cites her in his Address to the Greeks. Her name was still known in the twelfth century, when Eustathias included her in a list of five female poets in his commentary on the Iliad.

Praxilla was included in Judy Chicago's Heritage Floor, as one of the women associated with the place-setting for Sappho in The Dinner Party. Cy Twombly includes text from a poem by Praxilla in his 1960 painting Untitled (at Sea). One of her fragments was adapted by Michael Longley in his poem "Praxilla", from the 2004 collection Snow Water. An expansion for the video game Assassin's Creed: Odyssey features four missions focusing on Praxilla; in one of these the player character learns the three extant lines of Praxilla's hymn to Adonis.

== Works cited ==
- Balmer, Josephine (2013), Piecing Together the Fragments: Translating Classical Verse, Creating Contemporary Poetry, Oxford University Press
- Bowman, Laurel (2004), "The 'Women's Tradition' in Greek Poetry", Phoenix, 58 (1), doi:10.2307/4135194, JSTOR 4135194
- Campbell, D. A. (1992), Greek Lyric IV: Bacchylides, Corinna, and Others, Harvard University Press
- Cazzato, Vanessa (2016), "The Look of Praxilla Fr. 8 (PMG 754)", in Cazzato, Vanessa; Lardinois, André (eds.), The Look of Lyric: Greek Song and the Visual (PDF), Leiden: Brill
- Davies, Malcolm, ed. (2021), Lesser & Anonymous Fragments of Greek Lyric Poetry: A Commentary, Oxford: Oxford University Press
- Debrosse, Anne (2025), "L'héritage de Praxilla et la philosophie de l'Assassin. Enjeux pédagogiques, militants, ludiques et littéraires de l'extension d'Assassin's Creed Odyssey", Belphégor: Littérature populaire et culture médiatique, 23, doi:10.4000/14900
- de Vos, Mieke (2014), "From Lesbos she Took her Honeycomb: Sappho and the Female Tradition in Hellenistic Poetry", in Pieper, Christoph; Ker, James (eds.), Valuing the Past in the Greco-Roman World, Leiden: Brill
- Evans, Jane DeRose (2009). "Prostitutes in the Portico of Pompey?: A Reconsideration". Transactions of the American Philological Association. 139 (1). doi:10.1353/apa.0.0025. ISSN 1533-0699.
- Greub, Thierry (2017), Das ungezähmte Bild: Texte zu Cy Twombly, Brill
- Jones, Gregory S. (2014), "Voice of the People: Popular Symposia and the Non-Elite Origins of the Attic Skolia", Transactions of the American Philological Association, 144 (2): 229–262, doi:10.1353/apa.2014.0013
- Kirkwood, G. M. (1974), Early Greek Monody
- Natoli, Bartolo A.; Pitts, Angela; Hallett, Judith P. (2022), Ancient Women Writers of Greece and Rome
- Panagiotopoulou, Maria (2022), "Praxilla's Adonis and the Female Voice: An Erotic Reverse Priamel in Sappho's Shadow and Nossis's Light", Illinois Classical Studies, 47 (1): 24–44, doi:10.5406/23285265.47.1.02
- Plant, I.M. (2004), Women Writers of Ancient Greece and Rome, University of Oklahoma Press
- Rosenmeyer, P. A. (2022), "Cucumbers in Praxilla's "Adonis" fragment (fr. 747)", Eugesta, 12, doi:10.54563/eugesta.1225
- Snyder, Jane McIntosh (1989), The Woman and the Lyre: Women Writers in Classical Greece and Rome, Southern Illinois University Press
- Van der Valk, Marchinus (1974), "On the Composition of the Attic Skolia", Hermes, 102 (1)
- West, M.L. (1993), Greek Lyric Poetry: A New Translation, Oxford University Press
- West, M. L. (2011), "The Greek Poetess: Her Role and Image", Hellenica: Selected Papers on Greek Literature and Thought, vol. III, Oxford University Press
