= Skolion =

Song form in ancient Greece

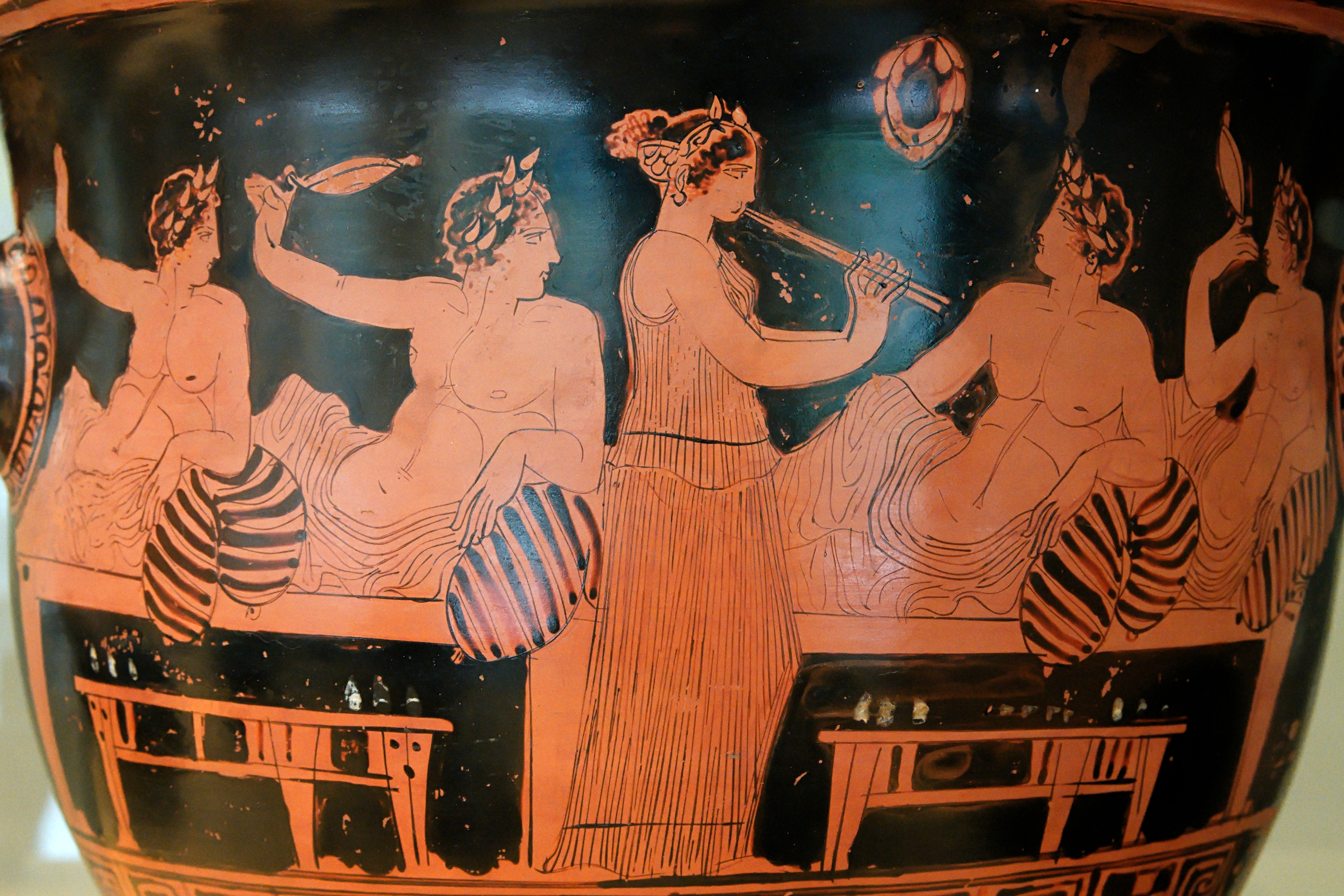
A female aulos-player entertains men at a symposium on this Attic red-figure bell-krater, c. 420 BC

A skolion (from Ancient Greek: σκόλιον) (pl. skolia), also scolion (pl. scolia), was a song sung by invited guests at banquets in ancient Greece. Often extolling the virtues of the gods or heroic men, skolia were improvised to suit the occasion and accompanied by a lyre, which was handed about from singer to singer as the time for each scolion came around. "Capping" verses were exchanged, "by varying, punning, riddling, or cleverly modifying" the previous contribution.

== Etymology ==
Although Greek folk etymology connects skolion with δύσκολος 'difficult', the likeliest connection is with σκέλος 'bent limb, part' as joined verse or repartee. This use is comparable to Japanese renga 'linked verse'.

== Background ==
Skolia are often referred to as 'banquet songs', 'convivial songs", or 'drinking songs'. The term also refers to poetry composed in the same form. In later use, the form was used in a more stately manner for chorus poetry in praise of the gods or heroes.

Terpander is said to have been the inventor of this poetic form, although that is doubtful. Instead, he may have adapted it for musical accompaniment. That these skolia were written, not only by poets like Alcaeus, Anacreon, Praxilla, Simonides, but also by Sappho and by Pindar, shows in what high esteem skolia were held by the Greeks. "The gods of Olympos sang at their banquets".

The Epitaph of Seikilos, dated to the first century AD, found with the original music in the ancient Greek notation, is the oldest complete example of ancient Greek music. Although often referred to as a skolion, its context as a short tombstone inscription scarcely suggests such a characterisation. It is, rather, an epigram. The confusion about this piece in modern scholarship is due to the association made by the scholiast to Plato's Gorgias 451e between the epigram and the skolion.

== Other uses ==
- At Balliol College, Oxford, the "Skoliasts" are the undergraduate Classics society.

== Sources ==
- Richard Reitzenstein, Epigramm und Skolion, Ein Beitrag zur Geschichte der Alexandrinischen Dichtung. Giessen (1893); Olms, Hildesheim (1970).
- Herbert Weir Smyth, Greek Melic Poets, (1900); New York, Biblo and Tannen (1963) ISBN 0-8196-0120-9
- Gregory Jones, "Non-Elite Origins of the Attic Skolia and the Birth of Democracy", Abstracts of Papers for the Annual Meeting, American Philological Association (APA) (2005)
- Elena Fabbro, Carmina Convivalia Attica, Rome 1995
