= Paula da Cunha Corrêa =

Associate Professor of Greek Language and Literature

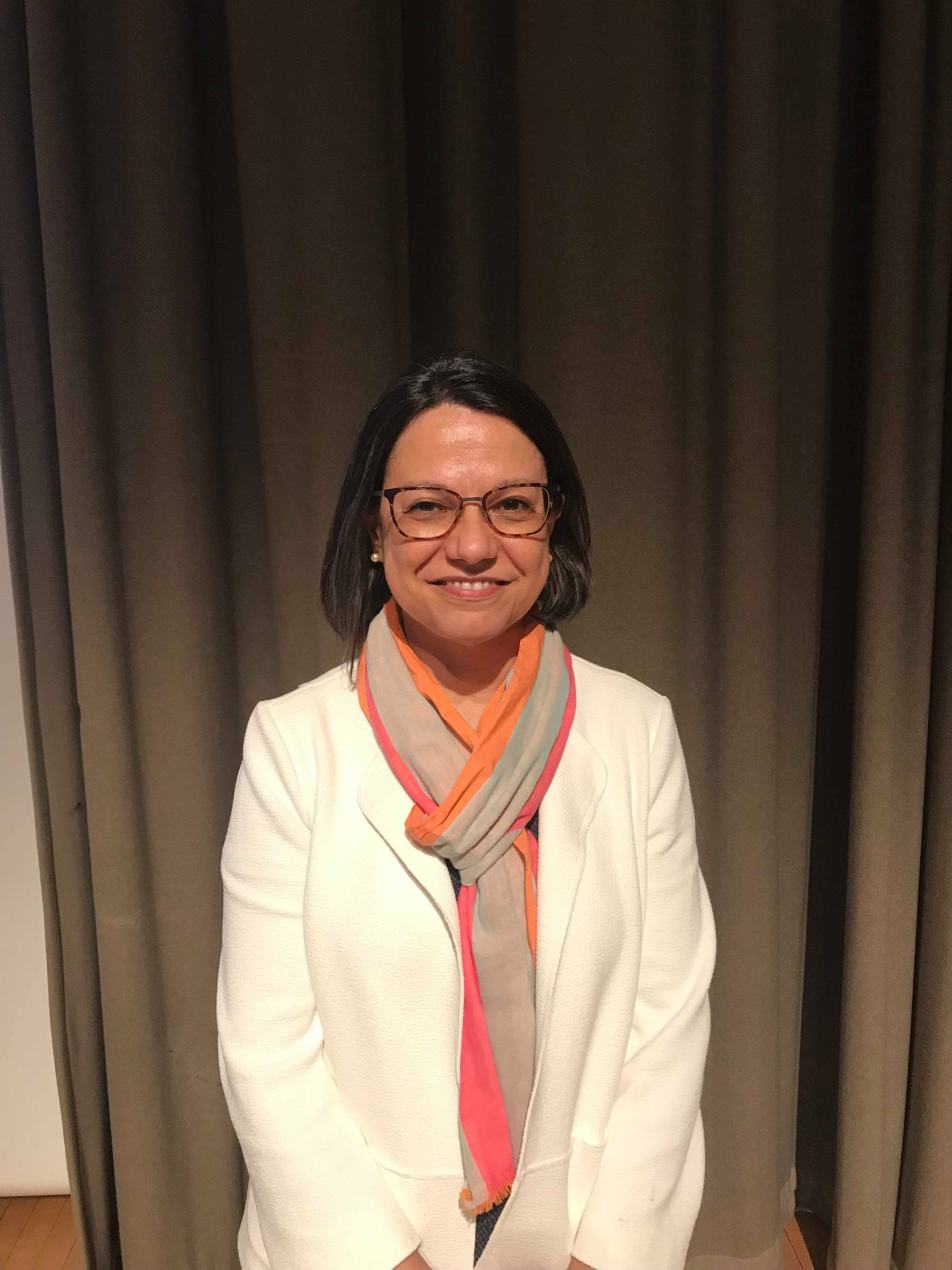
- da Cunha Corrêa at FIEC/CA 2019
- Occupation: Classicist

Academic background
- Education: University of São Paulo; University of London
- Thesis: Armas e Varões na lírica de Arquíloco de Paros (1995)

Academic work
- Discipline: Classics
- Institutions: University of São Paulo

Paula da Cunha Corrêa is an associate professor of Greek language and literature at the University of São Paulo, Brazil. She is known for her work on Archilochus and Greek lyric poetry.

== Career ==
Da Cunha Corrêa graduated in literature from the University of São Paulo in 1985. In 1986-87 she studied for an MA at Royal Holloway and Bedford New College, University of London, writing her thesis on 'Harmonioi and Nomoi' under the supervision of Martin West. She began studying for her DPhil at the University of São Paulo with a scholarship from the National Council for Scientific and Technological Development, and in 1993-94 was a visiting student at Hartford College, Oxford. Her doctoral thesis, completed in 1995 under Maria Sylvia de Carvalho Franco, was titled 'Armas e Varões na lírica de Arquíloco de Paros' (Weapons and men in the lyric poetry of Archilochus of Paros).

Since 1988, da Cunha Corrêa has been an associate professor in the Faculty of Philosophy, Literature and Human Sciences (FFLCH) at the University of São Paulo. In 1999, she was a visiting scholar at Brown University. In 2000-2001 she had a fellowship at Christ Church College, University of Oxford, supported by the São Paulo Research Foundation. During this period, she was also an Honorary Research Fellow at Exeter University. She was a visiting professor at Georgetown University in 2016-17. She has been interviewed on Brazilian television about teaching Latin and Greek.

She is currently working on a translation and commentary of the Catalogue of Women. She has also been involved in projects related to the teaching of Latin and Greek to school pupils, and is the coordinator of the outreach project 'Projeto Minimus: Grego e Latim no Ensino Fundamental'.

== Awards ==
In 2008 she received the Livre-docência, the highest academic award in Brazil, with a thesis monograph on animals in Archilochus.

In July 2019 da Cunha Corrêa was a keynote speaker at the XVth Congress of FIEC (the International Federation of Associations of Classical Studies) and the Classical Association annual conference.

== Selected publications ==
- 1993. 'O Fragmento 2W de Arquíloco.' Clássica (São Paulo), 2, 87-93.
- 1997. 'Arquíloco e Heráclito.' Kleos - Revista De Filosofia Antiga, 1.1, 47-62.
- 1998. 'A Escrita na Fábula de Arquíloco.' Revista da Anpoll, 4, 249-261.
- 2009. Armas e Varões; A Guerra na Lírica de Arquíloco. 2nd ed. São Paulo: Editora da UNESP.
- 2009. Harmonia; Mito e Música na Grécia Antiga. 2nd. ed. São Paulo: Editora Humanitas.
- 2010. Um Bestiário Arcaico; Fábulas e Imagens de Animais na Poesia de Arquíloco. Campinas: Editora da Universidade de Campinas - EDUNICAMP.
- 2012. With Santos, Macedo, Hasegawa (eds.). Hyperboreans. Essays in Greek and Latin poetry, philosophy, rhetoric and linguistics. São Paulo: Humanitas.
- 2016. 'The 'Ship of Fools' in Euenus 8b and Plato's Republic 488a-489a.' In eds. Swift., Carey. Iambus and Elegy, New Approaches. Oxford: Oxford University Press, p. 291-309.
- 2018. 'Reintroducing Classics in a Brazilian Public School: Project Minimus in São Paulo.' In eds. Holmes-Henderson, Hunt. Musié. Forward with Classics: Classical Languages in Schools and Communities. London: Bloomsbury. p. 55-66.
