= Alcman =

Ancient Greek lyric poet from Sparta

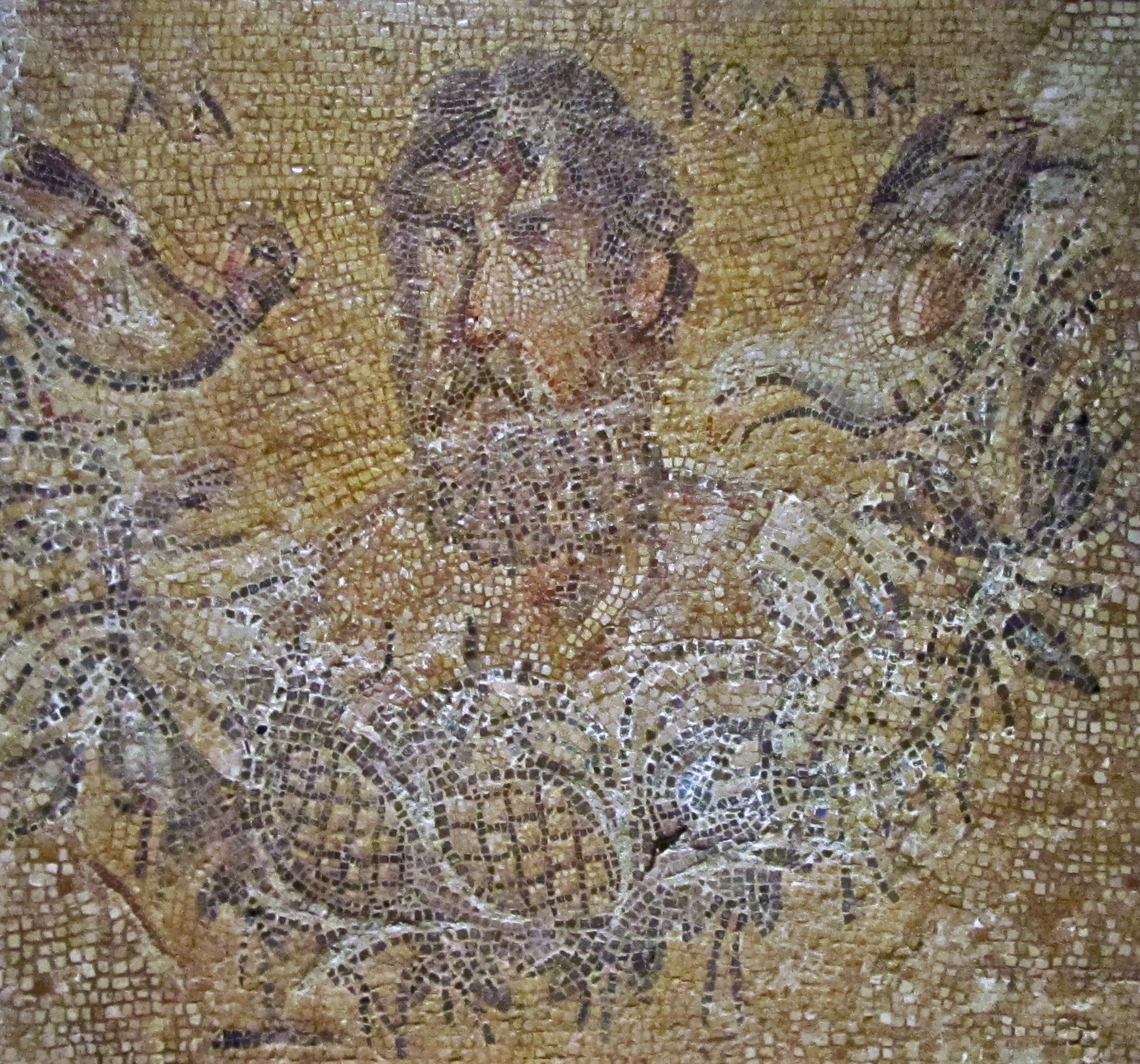
Roman-period mosaic portrait of Alcman from Gerasa, 3rd century AD

Alcman (/ˈælkmən/; Ancient Greek: Ἀλκμάν Alkmán; fl. 7th century BC) was an Ancient Greek choral lyric poet from Sparta. He is the earliest representative of the Alexandrian canon of the Nine Lyric Poets. He wrote six books of choral poetry, most of which is now lost; his poetry survives in quotation from other ancient authors and on fragmentary papyri discovered in Egypt. His poetry was composed in the local Doric dialect with Homeric influences. Based on his surviving fragments, his poetry was mostly hymns, and seems to have been composed in long stanzas made up of lines in several different meters.

== Biography ==
Alcman's dates are uncertain, but he was probably active in the late seventh century BC. The name of his mother is not known; his father may have been called either Damas or Titarus. Alcman's nationality was disputed even in antiquity. The records of the ancient authors were often deduced from biographic readings of their poetry, and the details are often untrustworthy. Antipater of Thessalonica wrote that poets have "many mothers" and that the continents of Europe and Asia both claimed Alcman as their son. Frequently assumed to have been born in Sardis, capital of ancient Lydia, the Suda claims that Alcman was actually a Laconian from Messoa.

The compositeness of his dialect may have helped to maintain the uncertainty of his origins, but the many references to Lydian and Asian culture in Alcman's poetry must have played a considerable role in the tradition of Alcman's Lydian origin. Thus Alcman claims he learned his skills from the "strident partridges" (caccabides), a bird native to Asia Minor and not naturally found in Greece. The ancient scholars seem to refer to one particular song, in which the chorus says: "He was no rustic man, nor clumsy (not even in the view of unskilled men?) nor Thessalian by race nor an Erysichaean shepherd: he was from lofty Sardis." Yet, given that there was a discussion, it cannot have been certain who was the third person of this fragment.

Some modern scholars defend his Ionian Greek or Lydian origin on the basis of the language of some fragments or the content. However, Sardis of the 7th century BC was a cosmopolitan city. The implicit and explicit references to Lydian culture may be a means of describing the girls of the choruses as fashionable.

One tradition, going back to Aristotle, holds that Alcman came to Sparta as a slave to the family of Agesidas (= Hagesidamus?), by whom he was eventually emancipated because of his great skill. Aristotle reported that it was believed Alcman died from a pustulant infestation of lice (phthiriasis), but he may have been mistaken for the philosopher Alcmaeon of Croton. According to Pausanias, he is buried in Sparta next to the shrine of Helen of Troy.

== Text ==
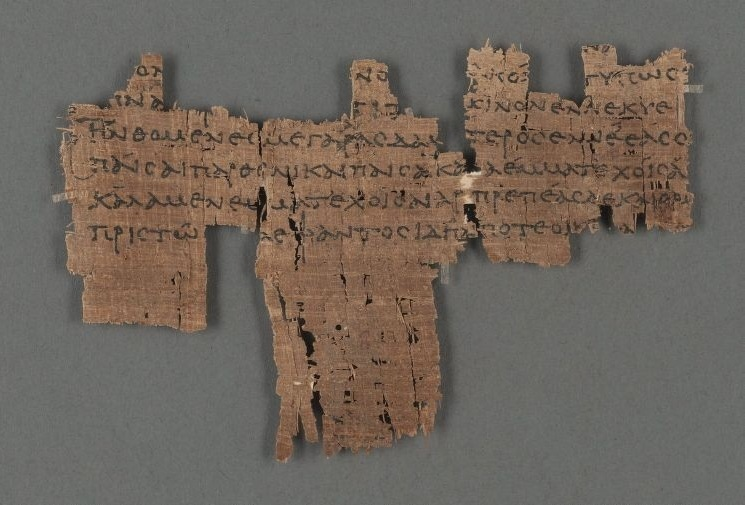
P. Oxy. 8 with fragment of Alcman's poem

=== Transmission ===
There were six books of Alcman's choral poetry in antiquity (c. 50–60 hymns), but they were lost at the threshold of the Middle Ages, and Alcman was known only through fragmentary quotations in other Greek authors until the discovery of a papyrus in 1855(?) in a tomb near the second pyramid at Saqqâra in Egypt. The fragment, which is now kept at the Louvre in Paris, contains approximately 100 verses of a so-called partheneion, i.e. a song performed by a chorus of young unmarried women. In the 1960s, many more fragments were published in the collection of the Egyptian papyri found in a dig at an ancient garbage dump at Oxyrhynchus. Most of these fragments contain poems (partheneia), but there are also other kinds of hymns among them.

=== Dialect ===
Pausanias says that even though Alcman used the Doric dialect, which does not usually sound beautiful, it did not at all spoil the beauty of his songs.

Alcman's songs were composed in the Doric dialect of Sparta (the so-called Laconian dialect). This is seen especially in the orthographic peculiarities of the fragments like α = η, ω = ου, η = ει, σ = θ and the use of the Doric accentuation, though it is uncertain whether these features were actually present in Alcman's original compositions or were added either by Laconian performers in the subsequent generations (see Hinge's opinion below) or even by Alexandrian scholars who gave the text a Doric feel using features of the contemporary, and not the ancient, Doric dialect.

Apollonius Dyscolus describes Alcman as συνεχῶς αἰολίζων "constantly using the Aeolic dialect". However, the validity of this judgment is limited by the fact that it is said about the use of the digamma in the third-person pronoun ϝός "his/her"; it is perfectly Doric as well. Yet, many existing fragments display prosodic, morphological and phraseological features common to the Homeric language of Greek epic poetry, and even markedly Aeolic and un-Doric features (σδ = ζ, -οισα = -ουσα) which are not present in Homer itself but will pass on to all the subsequent lyric poets. This mixing of features adds complexity to any analysis of his works.

The British philologist Denys Page comes to the following conclusion about Alcman's dialect in his influential monograph (1951):

(i) that the dialect of the extant fragments of Alcman is basically and preponderantly the Laconian vernacular; (ii) that there is no sufficient reason for believing that this vernacular in Alcman was contaminated by features from any alien dialect except the Epic; (iii) that features of the epic dialect are observed (a) sporadically throughout the extant fragments, but especially (b) in passages where metre or theme or both are taken from the Epic, and (c) in phrases which are as a whole borrowed or imitated from the Epic...

=== Metrical form ===
To judge from his larger fragments, Alcman's poetry was normally strophic: Different metres are combined into long stanzas (lines 9–14), which are repeated several times.

One popular metre is the dactylic tetrameter (in contrast to the dactylic hexameter of Homer and Hesiod).

== Content ==
=== The First Partheneion ===
The type of songs Alcman composed most frequently appear to be hymns, partheneia (maiden-songs Greek παρθένος "maiden"), and prooimia (preludes to recitations of epic poetry). Much of what little exists consists of scraps and fragments, difficult to categorize. The most important fragment is the First Partheneion or Louvre-Partheneion, found in 1855 in Saqqara in Egypt by the French scholar Auguste Mariette. This Partheneion consists of 101 lines, of which more than 30 are severely damaged. It is very hard to say anything about this fragment, and scholars have debated ever since the discovery and publication about its content and the occasion on which this partheneion could have been performed.

The choral lyrics of Alcman were meant to be performed within the social, political, and religious context of Sparta. Most of the existing fragments are lines from partheneia. These hymns are sung by choruses of unmarried women, but it is unclear how the partheneia were performed. The Swiss scholar Claude Calame (1977) treats them as a type of drama by choruses of girls. He connects them with initiation rites.

The girls express a deep affection for their chorus leader (coryphaeus):

For abundance of purple is not sufficient for protection, nor intricate snake of solid gold, no, nor Lydian headband, pride of dark-eyed girls, nor the hair of Nanno, nor again godlike Areta nor Thylacis and Cleësithera; nor will you go to Aenesimbrota's and say, 'If only Astaphis were mine, if only Philylla were to look my way and Damareta and lovely Ianthemis'; no, Hagesichora guards me.

I were to see whether perchance she were to love me. If only she came nearer and took my soft hand, immediately I would become her suppliant.

Earlier research tended to overlook the erotic aspect of the love of the partheneions; thus, instead of the verb translated as "guards", τηρεῖ, at the end of the first quotation, the papyrus has in fact the more explicit τείρει, "wears me out (with love)". Calame states that this homoerotic love, which is similar to the one found in the lyrics of the contemporaneous poet Sappho, matches the pederasty of the males and was an integrated part of the initiation rites. At a much later period, but probably relying on older sources, Plutarch confirms that the Spartan women were engaged in such same sex relationships. It remains open if the relationship also had a physical side and, if so, of what nature.

While not denying the erotic elements of the poem, contemporary classicist Kyriakos Tsantsanoglou has argued that the latter half of the first partheneion portrays Hagesichora critically and emphasizes her absence, rather than praising her and emphasizing her approval. Tsantsanoglou's interpretation has not been met with mainstream acceptance in classical studies.

Other scholars, among them Hutchinson and Stehle, see the First Partheneion as a song composed for a harvest ritual and not as a tribal initiation. Stehle argues that the maidens of the Partheneion carry a plough (φάρος, or, in the most translations, a robe, φᾶρος) for the goddess of Dawn (Orthria). This goddess of Dawn is honoured because of the qualities she has, especially in harvest time when the Greeks harvest during dawn (Hesiod, Works and Days, ll. 575–580: "Dawn gives out a third share of the work [that is, harvesting]"). The heat (embodied by the Sirius-star) is a threat for the dawn, so the chorus tries to defeat him. In the meanwhile the chorus-members present themselves as women ready for marriage. Stehle doesn't agree with Calame about the initiation-rituals, but cannot ignore the 'erotic' language that the poem expresses.

Some scholars think that the chorus was divided in two halves, who would each have their own leader; at the beginning and close of their performance, the two halves performed as a single group, but during most of the performance, each half would compete with the other, claiming that their leader or favorite was the best of all the girls in Sparta. There is, however, little evidence that the chorus was in fact divided. The role of the other woman of Alcman's first partheneion, Aenesimbrota, is contested; some consider her indeed a competing chorus-leader, others think that she was some sort of witch, who would supply the girls in love with magic love-elixirs like the pharmakeutria of Theocritus's Second Idyll, and others again argue that she was the trainer of the chorus like Andaesistrota of Pindar's Second Partheneion

=== Other songs ===
Alcman could have composed songs for Spartan boys as well. However, the only statement in support of this idea comes from Sosibius, a Spartan historian from the 2nd century BC. He says that songs of Alcman were performed during the Gymnopaedia festival (according to Athenaeus):

The chorus-leaders carry [the Thyreatic crowns] in commemoration of the victory at Thyrea at the festival, when they are also celebrating the Gymnopaedia. There are three choruses, in the front a chorus of boys, to the right a chorus of old men, and to the left a chorus of men; they dance naked and sing the songs of Thaletas and Alcman and the paeans of Dionysodotus the Laconian.

=== Praise for the gods, women, and the natural world ===
Regardless of the topic, Alcman's poetry has a clear, light, pleasant tone which ancient commentators have remarked upon. Details from rituals and festivals are described with care, even though the context of some of those details can no longer be understood.

Alcman's language is rich with visual description. He describes the yellow color of a woman's hair and the golden chain she wears about her neck; the purple petals of a Kalchas blossom and the purple depths of the sea; the "bright shining" color of the windflower and the multi-colored feathers of a bird as it chews green buds from the vines.

Much attention is focused on nature: ravines, mountains, flowering forests at night, the quiet sound of water lapping over seaweed. Animals and other creatures fill his lines: birds, horses, bees, lions, reptiles, even crawling insects.

Asleep lie mountain-top and mountain-gully, shoulder also and ravine; the creeping-things that come from the dark earth, the beasts whose lying is upon the hillside, the generation of the bees, the monsters in the depths of the purple brine, all lie asleep, and with them the tribes of the winging birds.

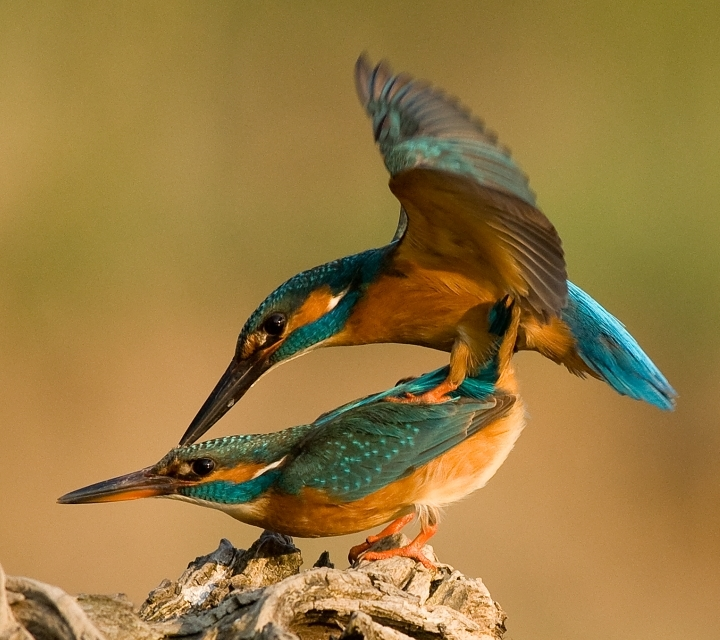
Common kingfishers mating

The poet reflects, in a poignant poem, as Antigonus of Carystus notes, how "age has made him weak and unable to whirl round with the choirs and with the dancing of the maidens", unlike the cock halcyons or ceryls, for "when they grow old and weak and unable to fly, their mates carry them upon their wings":

No more, O musical maidens with voices ravishing-sweet!
My limbs fail:—Ah that I were but a ceryl borne on the wing
Over the bloom of the wave amid fair young halcyons fleet,
With a careless heart untroubled, the sea-blue bird of the Spring!

=== Cosmological themes ===
Some fragments of Alcman's poetry reflect early cosmological ideas, where he poetically describes the origins of the universe and natural phenomena. His works blend mythological narratives with reflections on the cosmos, a characteristic feature of early Greek thought before the emergence of formal philosophy. Alcman's hymns suggest an interest in the order of the natural world, the role of primordial forces, and the creation of the cosmos; themes later explored more systematically by Presocratic philosophers like Thales, Anaximander, and Leucippus.

Scholars argue that Alcman's poetic cosmogony represents an important step toward the philosophical inquiry that developed in ancient Greece. While he did not formulate scientific theories, his lyrical exploration of the cosmos contributed to the broader intellectual tradition of early Greek cosmology.

== Bibliography ==
=== Texts and translations ===
- Greek Lyric II: Anacreon, Anacreontea, Choral Lyric from Olympis to Alcman (Loeb Classical Library) translated by David A. Campbell (June 1989) Harvard University Press ISBN 0-674-99158-3 (Original Greek with facing page English translations, an excellent starting point for students with a serious interest in ancient lyric poetry. Nearly one third of the text is devoted to Alcman's work.)
- Lyra Graeca I: Terpander, Alcman, Sappho and Alcaeus (Loeb Classical Library) translated by J. M. Edmonds (1922) Cambridge MA: Harvard UP; London: Heinemann) (Original Greek with facing page English translations, now in the public domain.)
- Sappho and the Greek Lyric Poets translated by Willis Barnstone, Schoken Books Inc., New York (paperback 1988) ISBN 0-8052-0831-3 (A collection of modern English translations suitable for a general audience, includes the entirety of Alcman's parthenion and 16 additional poetic fragments by him along with a brief history of the poet.)
- Alcman. Introduction, texte critique, témoignages, traduction et commentaire. Edidit Claudius Calame. Romae in Aedibus Athenaei 1983. (Original Greek with French translations and commentaries; it has the most comprehensive critical apparatus.)
- Poetarum melicorum Graecorum fragmenta. Vol. 1. Alcman, Stesichorus, Ibycus. Edidit Malcolm Davies. Oxonii: e typographeo Clarendoniano 1991.
- Greek lyric poetry: a commentary on selected larger pieces. G.O. Hutchinson. Oxford University Press 2001.

=== Secondary literature ===
- Calame, Claude: Les chœurs des jeunes filles en Grèce archaïque, vol. 1–2 (Filologia e critica 20–21). Roma: Edizioni dell'Ateneo 1977. Engl. transl. (only vol. 1): Choruses of Young Women in Ancient Greece. Lanham: Rowman & Littlefield 1997, rev. ed. 2001. ISBN 0-7425-1524-9 .
- Headlam, Walter George: A Book of Greek Verse (Cambridge University Press, 1906)
- Hinge, George: Die Sprache Alkmans: Textgeschichte und Sprachgeschichte (Serta Graeca 24). Wiesbaden: Dr. Ludwig Reichert Verlag 2006. ISBN 3-89500-492-8.
- Page, Denys L.: Alcman. The Partheneion. Oxford: The Clarendon Press 1951.
- Pavese, Carlo Odo: Il grande partenio di Alcmane (Lexis, Supplemento 1). Amsterdam: Adolf M. Hakkert 1992. ISBN 90-256-1033-1.
- Priestley, J.M.: The φαρος of Alcman's Partheneion 1, Mnemosyne 60.2 (2007) 175–195.
- Puelma, Mario: Die Selbstbeschreibung des Chores in Alkmans grossem Partheneion-Fragment, Museum Helveticum 34 (1977) 1–55.
- Risch, Ernst: 'Die Sprache Alkmans'. Museum Helveticum 11 (1954) 20–37 (= Kleine Schriften 1981, 314–331).
- Stehle, Eva: Performance and gender in Ancient Greece, Princeton 1997.
- Tsantsanoglou, Kyriakos (2012). Of Golden Manes and Silvery Faces: The Partheneion 1 of Alcman. Berlin: de Gruyter. ISBN 978-3110292008.. An alternatively reconstructed Greek text, translation, and commentary by a modern Greek scholar.
- Zaikov, Andrey: Alcman and the Image of Scythian Steed. In: Pontus and the Outside World: Studies in Black Sea History, Historiography, and Archaeology (= Colloquia Pontica. 9). Brill, Leiden and Boston 2004, 69–84. ISBN 90-04-12154-4.
