= Strophe =

First part of the ode; structural division of a poem

A strophe (/ˈstroʊfiː/) is a poetic term originally referring to the first part of the ode in Ancient Greek tragedy, followed by the antistrophe and epode. The term has been extended to also mean a structural division of a poem containing stanzas of varying line length. Strophic poetry is to be contrasted with poems composed line-by-line non-stanzaically, such as Greek epic poems or English blank verse, to which the term stichic applies.

In its original Greek setting, "strophe, antistrophe and epode were a kind of stanza framed only for the music", as John Milton wrote in the preface to Samson Agonistes, with the strophe chanted by a Greek chorus as it moved from right to left across the scene.

== Etymology ==
Strophe (from Greek στροφή, "turn, bend, twist") is a concept in versification which properly means a turn, as from one foot to another, or from one side of a chorus to the other.

== Poetic structure ==
In a more general sense, the strophe is a pair of stanzas of alternating form on which the structure of a given poem is based, with the strophe usually being identical to the stanza in modern poetry and its arrangement and recurrence of rhymes giving it its character. But the Greeks called a combination of verse-periods a system, giving the name "strophe" to such a system only when it was repeated once or more in unmoved form.

A simple form of Greek strophe is the Sapphic strophe. Like all Greek verse, it is composed of alternating long and short syllables (symbolized by — for long, u for short and x for either long or short) in this case arranged in the following manner:

— u — x — u u — u — —

— u — x — u u — u — —

— u — x — u u — u — x — u u — —

Far more complex forms are found in the odes of Pindar and the choral sections of Greek drama.

In choral poetry, it is common to find the strophe followed by a metrically identical antistrophe, which may – in Pindar and other epinician poets – be followed in turn by a metrically dissimilar epode, creating an AAB form.

== Origins and development ==
It is said that Archilochus first created the strophe by binding together systems of two or three lines. But it was the Greek ode-writers who introduced the practice of strophe-writing on a large scale, and the art was attributed to Stesichorus, although it is likely that earlier poets were acquainted with it. The arrangement of an ode in a splendid and consistent artifice of strophe, antistrophe and epode was carried to its height by Pindar.

== Variant forms ==
With the development of Greek prosody, various peculiar strophe-forms came into general acceptance, and were made celebrated by the frequency with which leading poets employed them. Among these were the Sapphic, the Elegiac, the Alcaic, and the Asclepiadean strophe, all of them prominent in Greek and Latin verse. The briefest and the most ancient strophe is the elegiac couplet, which consists of two verses of the same class of rhythm, the second producing a melodic counterpart to the first.

== Reproductions ==
The forms in modern English verse which reproduce most exactly the impression aimed at by the ancient ode strophe are the elaborate rhymed stanzas of such poems as Keats' Ode to a Nightingale or Matthew Arnold's The Scholar-Gipsy.

A strophic form of poetry called Muwashshah developed in Andalucia as early as the 9th century CE, which then spread to North Africa and the Middle East. Muwashshah was typically in classical Arabic, with the refrain sometimes in the local dialect.

== Contemporary usage ==
The term strophe is used in modern and post-modern criticism to indicate "long non-isomorphic units" of verse whereas the term "stanza [is used] for more regular ones".

== See also ==
- Strophic form
