= Antistrophe =

Second part of an ode sung by a Greek chorus

Antistrophe (Ancient Greek: ἀντιστροφή, "a turning back") is the portion of an ode sung by the chorus in its returning movement from west to east in response to the strophe, which was sung from east to west.

== Characteristics ==
=== Usage as a literary device ===
It has the nature of a reply and balances the effect of the strophe. Thus, in Gray's ode called "The Progress of Poesy" (excerpt below), the strophe, which dwelt in triumphant accents on the beauty, power and ecstasy verse, is answered by the antistrophe, in a depressed and melancholy key:

Man's feeble race what ills await,
Labour, and Penury, the racks of Pain,
Disease and Sorrow's weeping Train,
And Death, sad refuge from the storms of Fate,
(etc.)

When the sections of the chorus have ended their responses, they unite and close in the epode, thus exemplifying the triple form, in which the ancient sacred hymns of Greece were coined, from the days of Stesichorus onwards. As Milton says: "strophe, antistrophe and epode were a kind of stanza framed for the music then used with the chorus that sang".

=== Other semantic usage ===
Antistrophe was also a kind of ancient dance, wherein dancers stepped sometimes to the right, and sometimes to the left, still doubling their turns or conversions. The motion toward the left, they called antistrophe, from ἀντί, "against", and στροφή, of στρέφω, "I turn".
