= Epode =

Section, line, or type of poem in Ancient Greek poetry

According to one meaning of the word, an epode is the third part of an ancient Greek choral ode that follows the strophe and the antistrophe and completes the movement.

The word epode is also used to refer to the second, shorter line of a two-line stanza of the kind composed by Archilochus and Hipponax in which the first line consists of a dactylic hexameter or an iambic trimeter. (See Archilochian.) It can also be used (as in Horace's Epodes) to refer to poems written in such stanzas.

== Evolution ==
In the performance of a choral ode, at a certain point in time the choirs, which had previously chanted to the right of the altar or stage, and then to the left of it, combined and sang in unison, or permitted the coryphaeus to sing for them all, while standing in the centre.

The epode soon took its place in choral poetry, which it lost when that branch of literature declined. But it extended beyond the ode, and in the early dramatists we find numerous examples of monologues and dialogues framed on the epodical system. In Latin poetry the epode was cultivated, in conscious archaism, both as a part of the ode and as an independent branch of poetry. Of the former class, the epithalamia of Catullus, founded on an imitation of Pindar, present us with examples of strophe, antistrophe and epode; and it has been observed that the celebrated ode 1.12 of Horace, beginning Quem virum aut heroa lyra vel acri, possesses this triple character.

== Epodes of Horace ==
The word is now mainly familiar from the Epodon liber or the Book of Epodes, one of the early works of Horace. He says in the course of these poems that in composing them he was introducing a new form, at least in Latin literature, and that he was imitating the effect of the iambic distichs invented by Archilochus. Accordingly, the first ten of these epodes are composed in alternate verses of iambic trimeter and iambic dimeter, as at, for example, Epode 5.1–2:

At o deorum quicquid in caelo regit
terras et humanum genus

'But, o any of the gods in the heavens ruling
the lands and the human race.'

In the seven remaining epodes Horace diversified the measures, while retaining the general character of the distich. This group of poems belongs mostly to the early youth of the poet and displays a truculence and a controversial heat which are absent from his more mature writings. As he was imitating Archilochus in form, he believed himself justified in repeating the sarcastic violence of his fierce model. These particular poems of Horace, which are short lyrical satires, have appropriated almost exclusively the name of epodes, although they bear little enough resemblance to the epode of early Greek literature.

== See also ==
- Prosody (Latin)
