= Aristocleides =

5th-century BC Greek musician

Aristocleidas (Ancient Greek: Ἀριστοκλείδης) was a celebrated musician and citharode of ancient Greece. He was known as a master of the cithara, and traced his descent from the renowned Terpander. He lived around the time of the Persian War. He was the teacher of Phrynis of Mytilene. Some claimed that he came from Lesbos and was the person identified in the saying "after the Lesbian poet", which arose out of a tradition in Spartan competitions that gave primacy to Lesbian poets . The phrase was first referenced in a play by Cratinus and Aristotle also associated the poet in this saying with Terpander. Aristocleides' fame as one of the notable Lesbian diadokhê (along with Euainetidas and Phrynis of Mytilene) led some scholars to say that he was the subject of the proverb.
