= Philoxenus of Cythera =

Greek poet (c. 435/4 – 380/79 BC)

Philoxenus of Cythera (Greek: Φιλόξενος ὁ Κυθήριος; c. 435/4 – 380/79 BC) was a Greek dithyrambic poet, an exponent of the "New Music". He was one of the most important dithyrambic poets of ancient Greece.

== Life ==
Few details of Philoxenus' life are known. According to the Suda, Philoxenus was the son of Eulytides, from Cythera. On the conquest of the island by the Athenians, Philoxenus was taken as a slave to Athens, where he came into the possession of the dithyrambic poet Melanippides, who educated him.

Philoxenus lived for some time in Sicily, as the court-poet of Dionysius, tyrant of Syracuse. There, according to Athenaeus—probably based on an account by the 4th-century philosopher Phaenias of Eresus—Philoxenus tried to seduce Dionysius’ mistress Galateia, and was thrown into the quarries. However, according to Diodorus Siculus, Philoxenus' imprisonment in the quarries was the result of his refusal to praise Dionysius' bad poetry:

In Sicily Dionysius, the tyrant of the Syracusans, now that he was relieved of wars with the Carthaginians, enjoyed great peace and leisure. Consequently he devoted himself with much seriousness to the writing of poetry, and summoning men of repute in this line, he accorded them special honours and resorted to them, making use of them as instructors and revisers of his poems. Elated by the flattering words with which these men repaid his benefactions, Dionysius boasted far more of his poems than of his successes in war. Among the poets in his company was Philoxenus, the writer of dithyrambs, who enjoyed very high repute as a composer in his own line. After dinner, when the compositions of the tyrant, which were wretched, had been read, he was asked what was his judgement of the poetry. When he replied with a good deal of frankness, the tyrant, offended at his words, found fault with him that he had been moved by jealousy to use scurrilous language and commanded his servants to drag him off forthwith to the quarries. On the next day, however, when Philoxenus' friends made petition for a grant of pardon, Dionysius made up with him and again included the same men in his company after dinner. As the drinking advanced, again Dionysius boasted of the poetry he had written, recited some lines which he considered to be happily composed, and then asked, "What do you think of the verses?" To this Philoxenus said not a word, but called Dionysius' servants and ordered them to take him back to the quarries.

After leaving Sicily, according to the Suda, he lived for a while in the Greek colony of Taras (modern Taranto) in Italy, and died at Ephesus. According to the Parian Chronicle, he died in 380/79 BC, at the age of 55.

The great popularity of Philoxenus is attested by a complimentary resolution passed by the Athenian Senate in 393 BC. A character in a comedy by Antiphanes spoke of him as "a god among men"; Alexander the Great had his poems sent to him in Asia; the Alexandrian grammarians received him into the canon; and down to the time of Polybius his works were regularly learned and annually performed by the young men of Arcadia.

== Poetry ==
Philoxenus was a poet-musician, one of the most important of his era. He was a so-called "New Music" poet, representing a style that developed between the end of the 5th century BC and the first decades of the 4th century BC. He, along with other such "New Music" poets as Melanippides and Timotheus, introduced significant changes in music. These included adding to the number of strings on the cithara, introducing complex melodies with more notes and larger intervals between notes, and using multiple changes of harmonies and rhythms in a single work.

Philoxenus introduced other innovations, for example while the traditional dithyramb was a choral song accompanied by the aulos, Philoxenus' Cyclops sang a solo accompanied by the cithara. And, in another innovation for dithyrambic performance, the same character was apparently supplied with a costume, which included a leather bag, and sprigs of herbs.

According to the Suda, Philoxenus composed twenty-four dithyrambs, and a lyric poem on the descendants of Aeacus. His most important dythyramb was the Cyclops a pastoral burlesque on the love of the Cyclops Polyphemus for the nymph Galatea. It was parodied by Aristophanes in the Plutus.

Another work of Philoxenus (sometimes attributed to Philoxenus of Leucas, a notorious glutton) is the Deipnon ("Dinner"), of which considerable fragments have been preserved by Athenaeus. The poem gives an account of an elaborate dinner, probably intended as a satire on the luxury of the Sicilian court. In this poem, Philoxenus describes some cakes as "mixed with safflower, toasted, wheat-oat-white-chickpea-little thistle-little-sesame-honey-mouthful of everything, with a honey rim".

== Cyclops ==
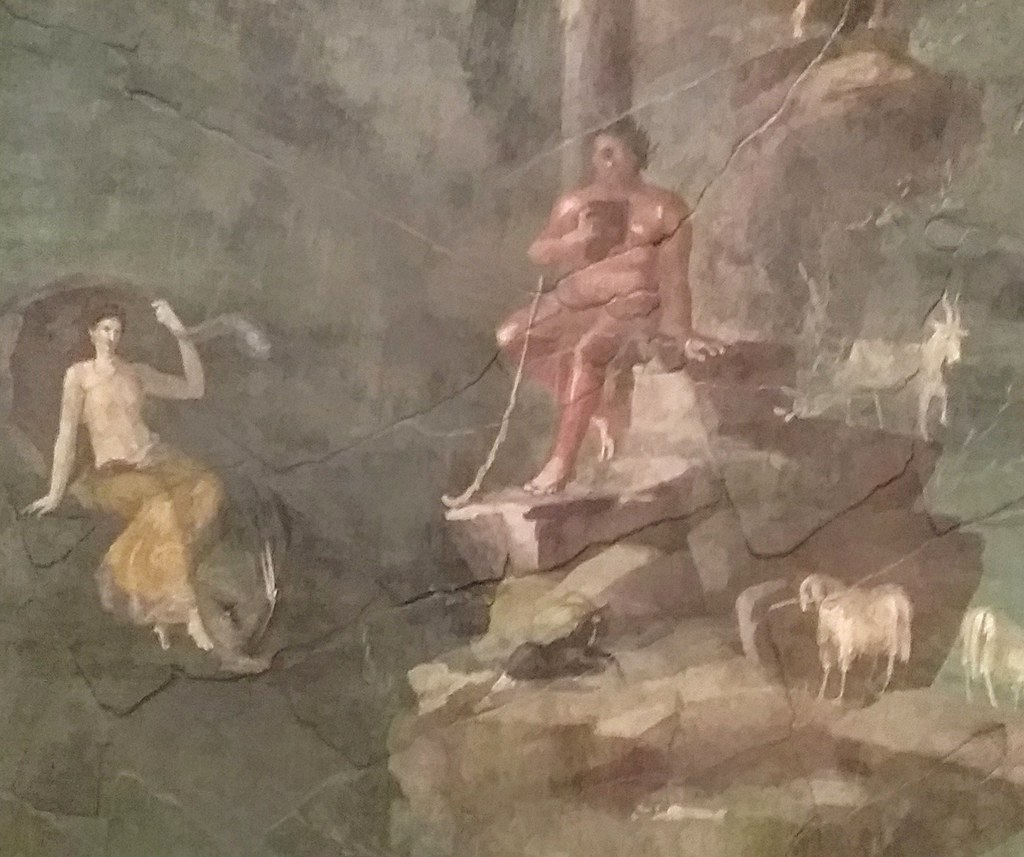
Detail of a 1st-century BC wall painting from a bedroom in the Villa of Agrippa Postumus at Boscotrecase showing a landscape with Galatea and Polyphemus with some of his flock

In his poem Cyclops or Galatea, Philoxenus took up the story of Polyphemus, the Cyclops famously encountered by Odysseus in the Odyssey. It was written to be performed in a wild and ecstatic song-and-dance form—the dithyramb, of which only fragments remain. Philoxenus' story occurs well before the one-eyed monster was blinded by Odysseus. Philoxenus was perhaps the first to provide a female love interest for the Cyclops. The object of Polyphemus’ romantic desire is a beautiful sea nymph named Galatea. Philoxenus’ Polyphemus is not a cave dwelling, monstrous brute, as in the Odyssey, but instead he is a bit like Odysseus himself in his vision of the world: He has weaknesses, he is adept at literary criticism, and he understands people.

The date of composition for Philoxenus' Cyclops is not precisely known, but it must be prior to 388 BC, when Aristophanes parodied it in his comedy Plutus (Wealth); and probably after 406 BC, when Dionysius I became tyrant of Syracuse, and when Philoxenus served as his court poet. Aristophanes' parody suggests that there had been a recent performance in Athens of Philoxenus' poem.

There were contradictory ancient accounts concerning Philoxenus' inspiration for the poem. According to a Scholiast on Theocritus' Idyll 6, the historian Duris (c. 340–c. 260 BC) said that there was a shrine to Galatea near Mount Etna built by Polyphemus, and that when Philoxenus visited the shrine and could think of no reason for it, he invented the story of Polyphemus' love for Galatea. However, in what is probably the earliest account, that of Phaenias', by way of Athenaes, Philoxenus' Cyclops was written, while the poet was imprisoned in the quarries, as a court satire, where, in the manner of a Roman à clef, the characters in Philoxenus' dithyramb: Polyphemus, Odysseus and the sea nymph Galatea, were meant to represent Dionysius, Philoxenus, and Dionysius' mistress, the aulos-player Galatea, respectively.

Philoxenus had his Polyphemus play the cithara, a professional lyre requiring great skill. The Cyclops playing such a sophisticated and fashionable instrument would have been quite a surprising juxtaposition for Philoxenus' audience, and perhaps signaled a competition between two genres of performance—the nome (a primitive music form of a poem set to music) and the dithyramb. So the character of the Cyclops, in this interpretation, would not represent Dionysius the tyrant of Sicily, but perhaps instead the cithara-playing poet Timotheus.

The romantic element, originated by Philoxenus, was revived by Hellenistic poets that were to follow, including: Theocritus, Callimachus, Hermesianax, and Bion of Smyrna.

=== Aristophanes' parody ===
The text of Aristophanes’ last extant play Plutus (Wealth) has survived, but with almost all of its choral odes missing, what remains for the chorus shows Aristophanes (as he does to some extent in all his plays) parodying a contemporary literary work—in this case Philoxenus’ Cyclops. With this parody Aristophanes, while poking fun at literary aspects of Philoxenus' dithyramb, is at the same time commenting on musical developments occurring in the fourth century BC, developing themes that run through the whole play. It also contains lines and phrases taken directly from Cyclops.

The slave Cario, tells the chorus that his master has brought home with him the god Wealth, and because of this they will all now be rich. The chorus wants to dance for joy. So Cario begins a different kind of performance, parodying Philoxenus' dithyramb. As a solo performer leading a chorus that sings and dances, Cario recreates the form of a dithyramb being performed. He first casts himself in the role of Polyphemus, and the chorus as his flock of sheep and goats:

And now I wish—threttanello!—to imitate the Cyclops and, swinging my feet to and fro like this, to lead you in the dance. But come on, children, shout and shout again the songs of bleating sheep and smelly goats and follow with your cocks skinned—for you’re going to eat the goat’s breakfast!

Cario vocally imitates the sound of a lyre ("threttanello") which is thought to be a reference to Philoxenus having Polyphemus play the lyre, and "to eat the goat’s breakfast" is an obscene joke referencing self-administered fellatio.

The chorus, however, does not want to play sheep and goats, they would rather be Odysseus and his men, and threaten to blind Cario (as the drunken Cyclops) with a wooden stake:

But we in turn will try—threttanello!—while we bleat to catch you as the Cyclops, still hungry, holding a sack of damp wild greens, and hung over to boot! Then while you happen to take a nap while leading your sheep, we’ll pick up a great half-burnt stake and blind you!

Philoxenus continues to be quoted in this scene from Aristophanes, and the chorus responds to Cario's obscene joke with their own comic description of a drunken Cyclops passing out while leading his sheep.

Aristophanes delivers a satiric rebuttal to a dithyramb that has wandered into territory more properly the domain of drama.

=== Aristotle’s comment ===
Philoxenus' Cyclops is also referred to in Aristotle's Poetics. Aristotle discusses representations of people in tragedy and comedy (“tragedy differs from comedy. The latter sets out to represent people as worse than they are to-day, the former as better”). Before making this point, he has indicated that as in comedy, it is the same in dithyrambic poetry, and cites as examples the Cyclops of both Timotheus and Philoxenus.
