= Phrynnis =

5th-century BC Greek musician and poet

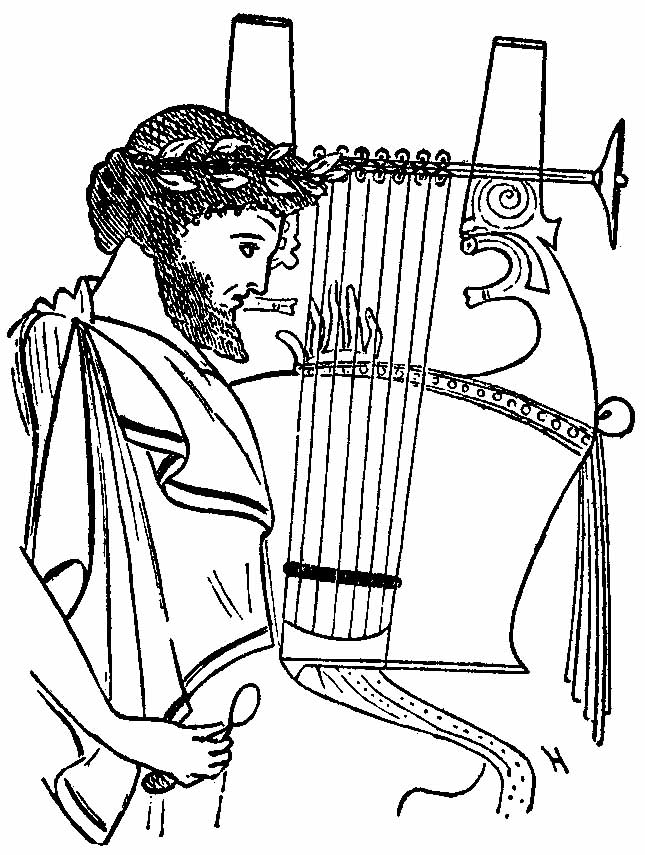
Representation of the poet at work.

Phrynnis or Phrynis (Ancient Greek: Φρύννις or Ancient Greek: Φρύνις) of Mytilene was a celebrated dithyrambic poet of ancient Greece, who lived roughly around the time of the Peloponnesian War. His career began no later than 446 BCE.

Phrynnis was born in Mytilene, on the island of Lesbos, but later lived and made his career at Athens. His father's name seems to have been "Camon" or "Cambon" but the true form is very doubtful. Respecting his own name, also, there is some doubt among scholars, but the form "Phrynnis" is the genuine Aeolic Greek form.

He belonged to the Lesbian school of citharoedic music, having been taught music by Aristocleides, a musician of the time of the Persian Wars, who claimed a lineal descent from the renowned Terpander. Before receiving the instructions of this musician, Phrynnis had been a flute-player, which may partly account for the liberties he took with the music of the cithara. His innovations and affectations are repeatedly attacked by the comic poets, especially Pherecrates and Aristophanes.

Among the innovations which he is said to have made, was the addition of two strings to the heptachord; and Plutarch relates that, when he went to Sparta, the Ephors cut off two of his nine strings, only leaving him the choice whether he would sacrifice the two lowest or the two highest. Some scholars consider this anecdote doubtful; for it is not improbable that the number of strings had been increased at an earlier period. What is not controversial is that Phrynnis earned the ire of these poets owing to his technique of "bending" or "turning" (kampai) the melody, a modulation that other poets thought "ruined" the music.

Phrynnis was the first who gained the victory in the musical contests established by Pericles, in connection with the festivals of the Panathenaic Games, probably in 445 BCE. He was one of the instructors of Timotheus of Miletus, who, however, defeated him on one occasion.

An ahistorical version of Phrynnis was used as a main character in the treatise called Phynnis Mitilenaeus by German musician and writer Wolfgang Printz in the 1670s. This was a sort of moral screed against "beer fiddlers", or Printz's caricature of "overly sensual" musicians.
