= Pericleitus =

Pericleitus was a Lesbian lyric musician of the school of Terpander, flourished shortly before Hipponax, that is, a little earlier than 550 BC. At the Lacedaemonian festival of the Carneia, there were musical contests with the cithara, in which the Lesbian musicians of Terpander's school had obtained the prize from the time of Terpander himself to that of Pericleitus, with whom the glory of the school ceased.
