= Citharode =

Professional musician in Classical antiquity

kitharode (citharode) (Note: There are an elaborate variety of spellings, each altered to pronounce correctly in different languages, and to incorporate partial translations; since there is no modern form of kithara, that is typically left un-translated. (Strictly speaking, kitharoedos / citharoedus translates to "zitherist", but that seems to never be used.) Variants include: Ancient Greek: κιθαρῳδός [kitʰarɔː'dós]; Latin: citharoedus (translit. Greek); citharode (Anglicised translit. Latin); kitharode (Anglicised translit. Greek); citharede (rare); citharoede (rare))
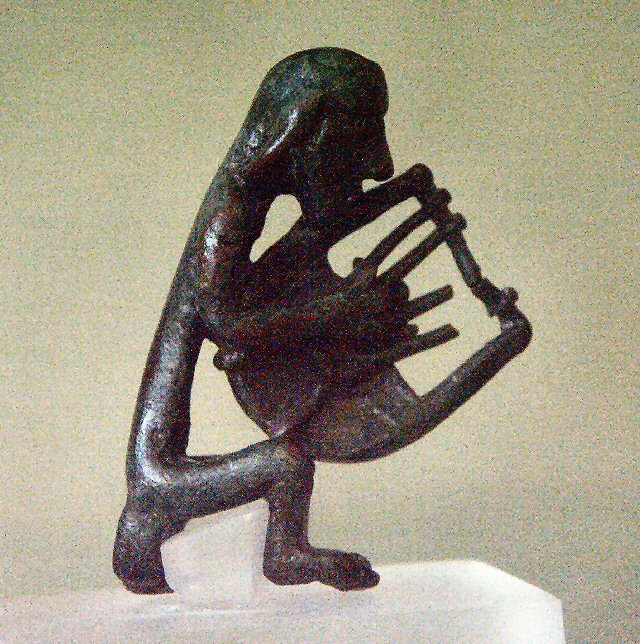
- Bronze cast figure of a kithara player from Crete.

Occupation
- Occupation type: professional performer
- Activity sectors: self-accompanied musical performance

Description
- Competencies: singing, strummed string instrument (lyre family), (Note: A kitharode would automatically be expected to be able to also play a barbiton, lyre, and phorminx, provided it was a version with the same number of strings as the standard kithara.) music theory, music notation (Note: It is unclear how far back Greek musical notation goes. It may have only been a competency of kitharodes during the late classical period; from some point, both kitharodes and auletes would have required to simultaneously read two separate systems of notation: One for instrumental music and the other for sung music.)
- Related jobs: Aulete / aulist (aulos player, "piper"), Citharist (non-singing kithara player)

A kitharode (Latinized citharode) (Ancient Greek: κιθαρῳδός [kitʰarɔː'dós]; Latin: citharoedus) was a professional performer in Classical antiquity who sang and played cithara to accompany their singing. A citharist was a performer who only played, and did not sing. Famous Greek citharodes included Terpander, Sappho, and Arion.

Citharodes remained common from classical Greece into the Roman imperial period and throughout antiquity; Roman emperor Nero was famously a citharode himself. In his day, a citharode sang a tragic monologue in full theatrical costume, including a mask.

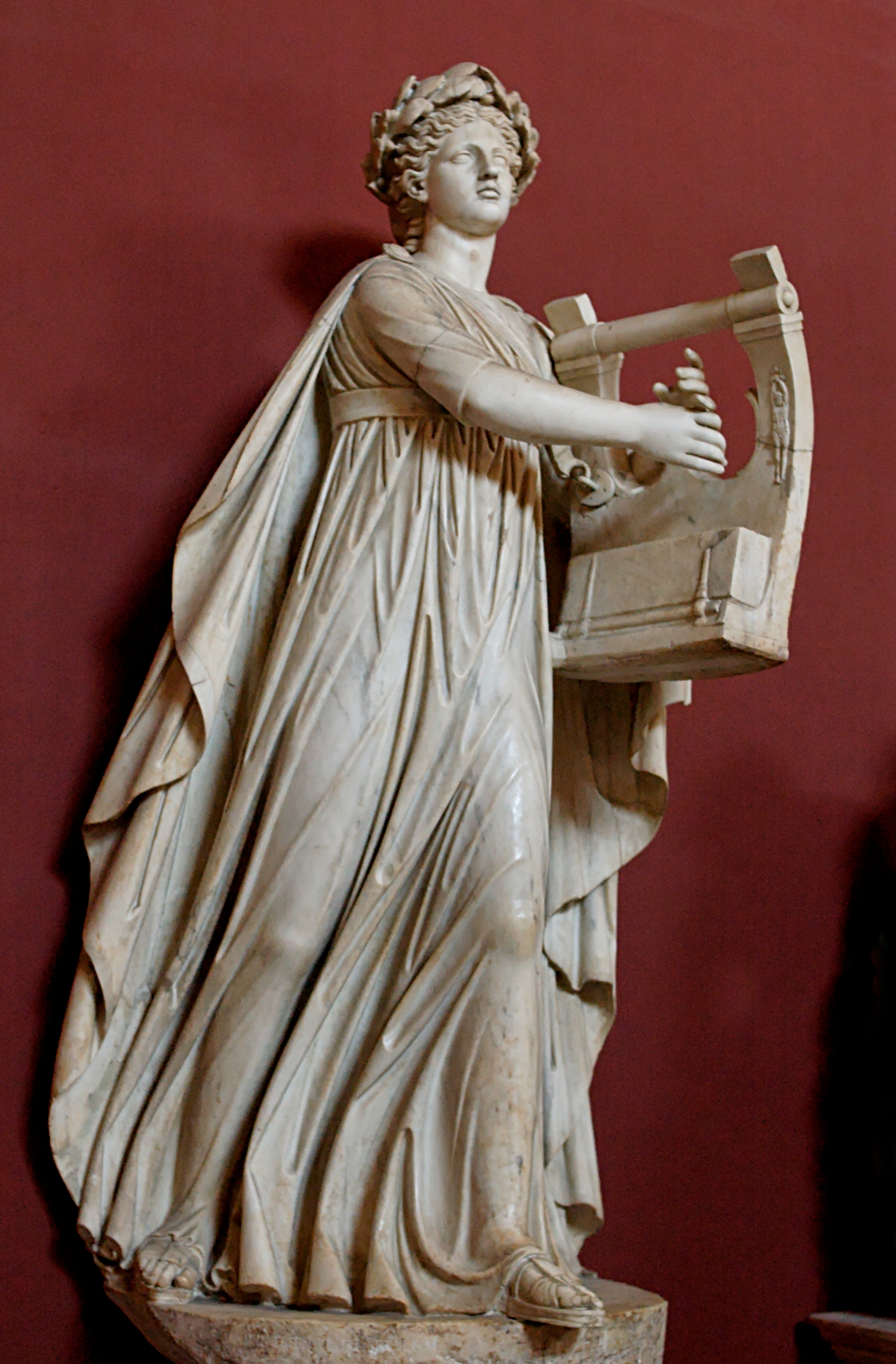
Apollo kitharoidos (Apollo holding a cithara and wearing the customary kitharōdos’ robes) and musagetes (leading the Muses). Marble, Roman artwork, 2nd century CE.

"Citharoedus" or "Citharede" was also an epithet of Apollo (Apollo Citharede), and the term is used to refer to statues which portray Apollo with his lyre.

== See also ==
- Aeneator
- Aoidos
- Apollo
- Arion
- Sappho
- Terpander

Relevant musical instruments

- aulete (aulos player)
- aulos (contemporaneous wind instrument)
- barbiton (bass kithara)
- kithara (professional instrument)
- lyre (folk instrument)
- phorminx (advanced folk inst.)
- rhapsode (professional singer)

Related type of statuary

- Apollo Citharoedus
