= Athenodoros of Teos =

Ancient Greek musician

Athenodoros (Ancient Greek: Ἀθηνόδωρος) of Teos was a musician of ancient Greece who lived in the 4th century BCE.

He was known as a player on the kithara, and was one of the performers who assisted at the festivities celebrated at the Susa weddings in 324 BCE, on the occasion of the marriage of Alexander the Great with his second wife, Stateira. Everything we know about him comes from the History of Alexander by Alexander's court historian Chares of Mytilene, and nothing further is known about his life.

There was also a tragedian of the same name, whose services were called into requisition on the same occasion.
