= Melanippides =

5th-century BC Greek poet

Melanippides of Melos (Greek: Μελανιππίδης), one of the most celebrated lyric poets in the use of dithyramb, and an exponent of the "new music."

== Biography ==
The life of Melanippides can only be fixed within rather uncertain limits. He is thought to have flourished around the middle of the 5th-century BC. He was younger than Lasus of Hermione (Plut. Mus. p. 1141, c.), and younger than Diagoras of Melos. He was a contemporary of the comic poet Pherecrates. He lived for some time at the court of Archelaus of Macedon, and died there in around 412 BC.

His high reputation as a poet is intimated by Xenophon, who makes Aristodemus give him first place among dithyrambic poets, alongside Homer, Sophocles, Polykleitos and Zeuxis, as the chief masters in their respective arts, and by Plutarch, who mentions him, with Simonides and Euripides, as among the most distinguished masters of music.

Melanippides did not, however, escape the censures which the old comic poets so often heap upon their lyric contemporaries for their corruption of the severe beauties of the ancient music. Pherecrates places him at the head of such offenders and charges him with relaxing and softening the ancient music by increasing the chords of the lyre to twelve (or perhaps ten) and thus paving the way for the further licences introduced by Cinesias, Phrynis, and Timotheus of Miletus. According to Aristotle, he altogether abandoned the antistrophic arrangement, and introduced long preludes (anabolai) in which the union, which was considered essential in ancient times, between music and the words of poetry, seems to have been severed.

Plutarch (or the author of the essay on music which bears his name) said that in his flute-music he subverted the old arrangement by which the flute-player was hired and trained by the poet, and was entirely subordinate to him. But there is probably some mistake in this, as the fragment of Pherecrates, which the author quotes in confirmation of his statement, contains not a word about flute-music, but attacks only the alterations in the lyre. On the other hand, Athenaeus cites a passage from the Marsyas of Melanippides, which seems to show that he rejected and despised flute-music altogether.

According to the Suda, Melanippides wrote lyric songs and dithyrambs. Several verses of his poems are still preserved. The titles of the poems Marsyas, Persephone and The Danaïdes have misled Fabricius and others into the supposition that Melanippides was a tragic poet, a mistake which has been made with respect to the titles of the dithyrambs of other poets. The fragments are collected by Bergk. We learn from Meleager of Gadara that some of the hymns of Melanippides had a place in his Garland.
