= Barbiton =

Ancient stringed instrument

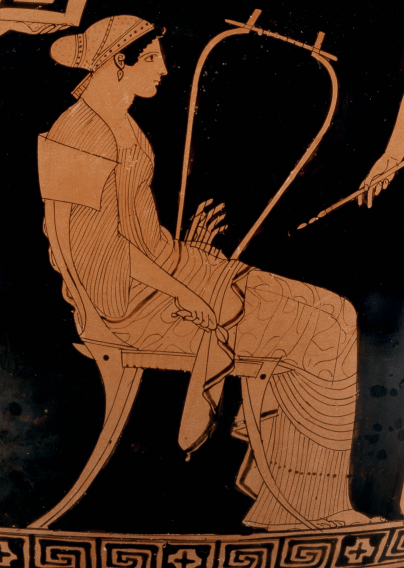
Greece 460-450 B.C. A woman holds a barbiton.

The barbiton, or barbitos (Gr: βάρβιτον or βάρβιτος; Lat. barbitus), is an ancient stringed instrument related to the lyre known from Greek and Roman classics.

The Greek instrument was a bass version of the kithara, and belonged in the zither family, but in medieval times, the same name was used to refer to the barbat; a different instrument that is a variety of lute.

== Error in the use of names ==
The barbat, or barbud, began being translated into Latin as barbiton sometime during the late Middle Ages, a mistaken practice which has passed into English and other European languages through long misuse. The barbat is an unrelated lute-family instrument developed in Persia, whereas the barbiton (a bass kithara) was developed in Greek-speaking western Anatolia, where it was popular, and spread into the rest of the Aegean.

Throughout this article barbiton refers only to the Anatolian / Aegean instrument, and barbat is the only name used to refer to the lute-family instrument from Persia.

Differences between the barbat and the barbiton
Barbat	Barbiton
The barbat has always had a finger board for changing the pitch of the strings.	The barbiton has never had a finger board; its strings’ pitch could not be changed without retuning.
Like all instruments in the lute family, different chords are played on the barbat by fingering the pitch of the strings.	Like all instruments in the lyre / kithara family, different chords were played on the strings by resting fingers against strings for the unwanted notes, to silence them.
For most chords all of the strings of the barbat would sound for any one chord.	For all chords, only a few of the barbiton's strings would sound; most of its strings were silent for any one chord.

Since neither instrument was familiar to European musicians of the late Middle Ages – both had fallen out of use in the occident sometime between the mid-Imperial period and the end of the Roman empire – the error was neither caught nor corrected. The mistake seems to be perpetually dredged up from the earlier erroneous texts.

== Descriptions of the Ancient Greek barbiton ==
The barbiton (bass kithara) was rare and considered exotic in the Hellenic world – only popular in Anatolia and the eastern Aegean. (Note: Schlesinger (1911) cites: Susemihl, Franz; Hicks, Robert Drew (1894). Aristotle, Politics. Vol. viii (6th ed.). pp. 604 (=1341a 40) and 632, Daremberg and Saglio, Dict. d'ant. gr. et rom.) There are much fewer descriptions of it than the well-regarded kithara, and some depictions of it on painted vases were made by painters and sculptors who may have rarely seen one themselves, if ever. Consequently, ethno-musicologists struggle to sort out the few available texts, vase paintings, and statuary.

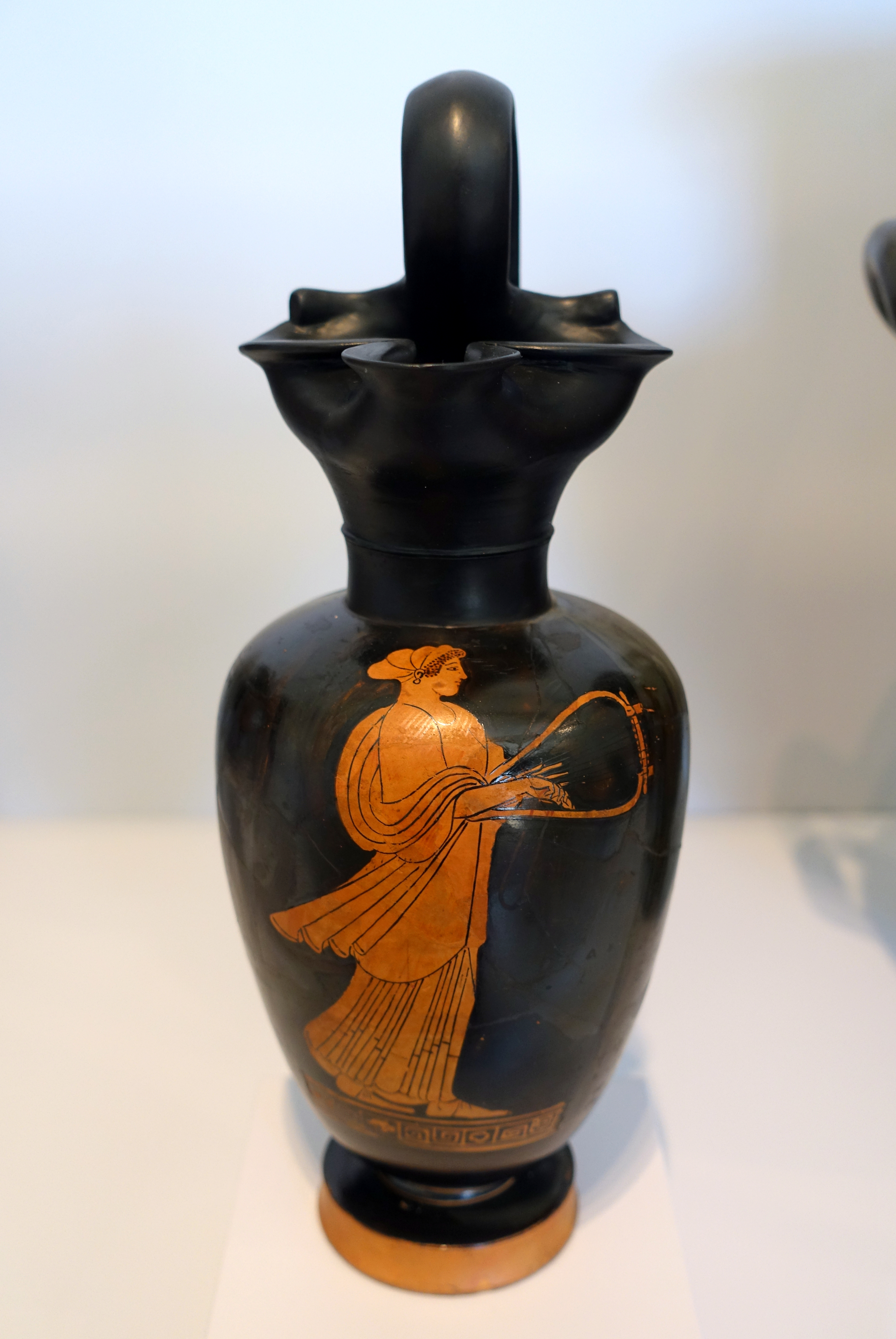
Woman playing a barbiton, Greek, Attic, 490–480 BC, terracotta, red-figure technique – Arthur M. Sackler Museum, Harvard University

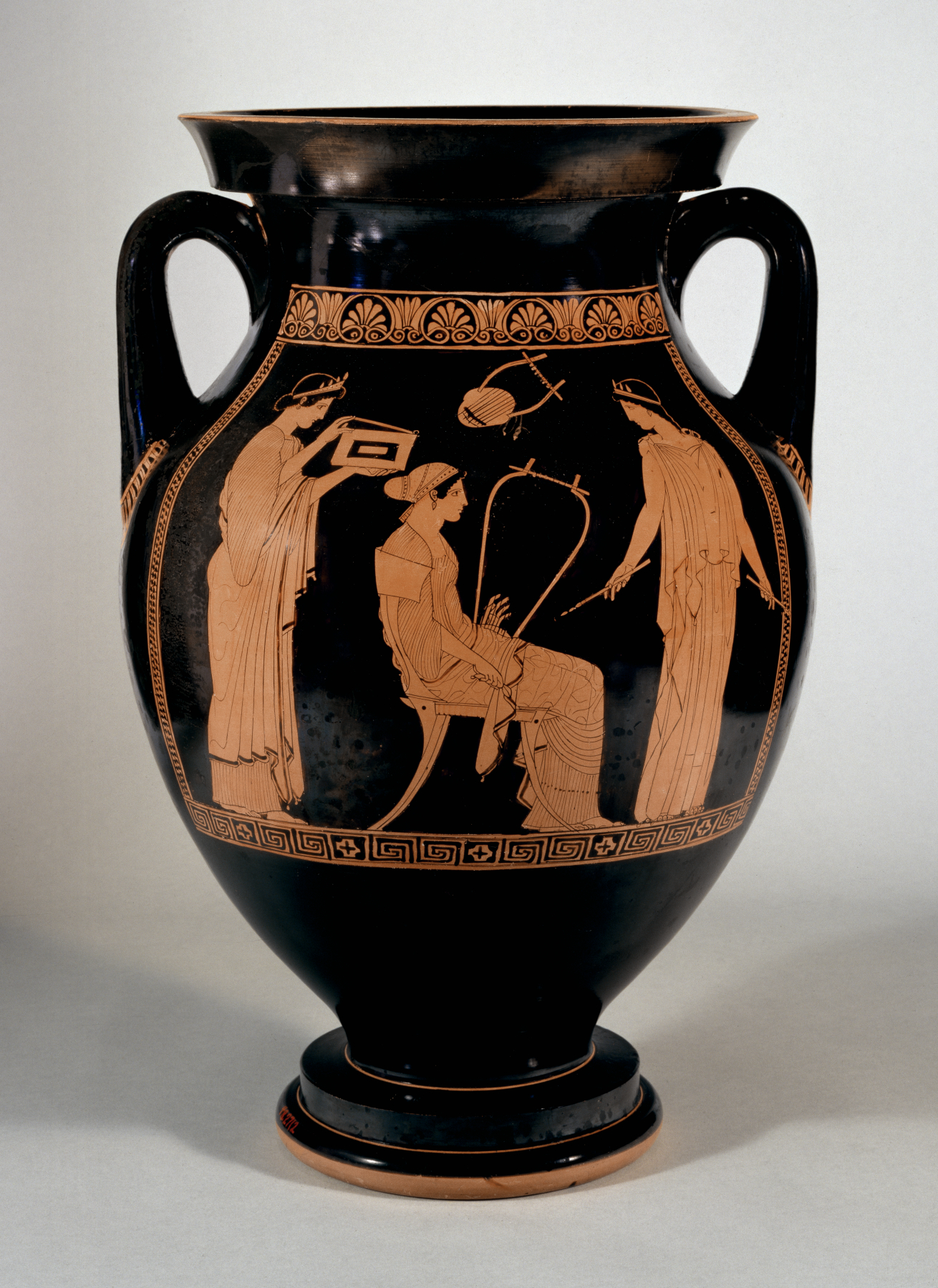
Woman with barbiton, from red-figure amphora, Greece, c. 460–450 B.C. The larger instrument would play deeper notes than a smaller lyre (seen hanging above the woman).

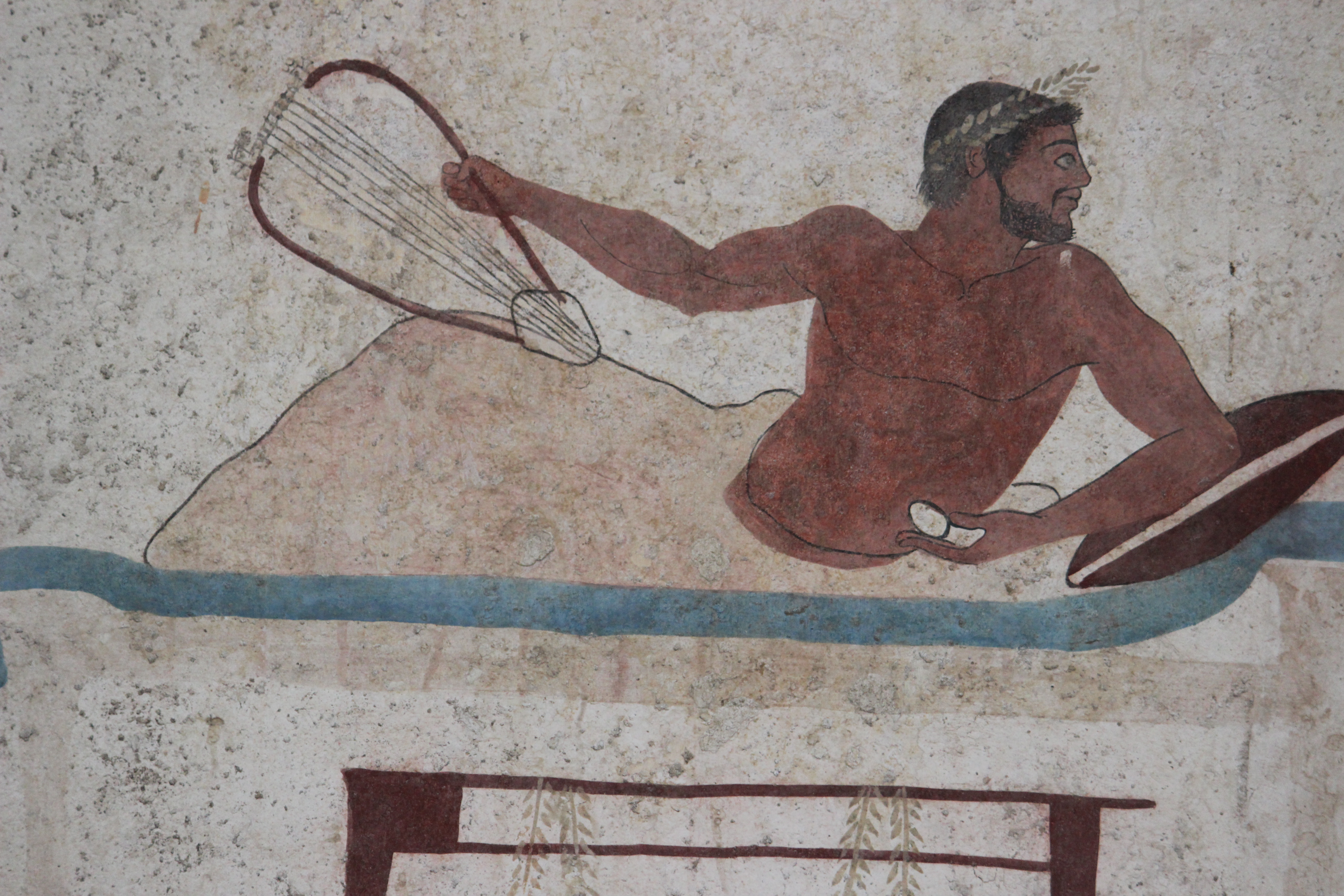
5th century BCE. Lyra or barbitos from the Tomb of the Diver.

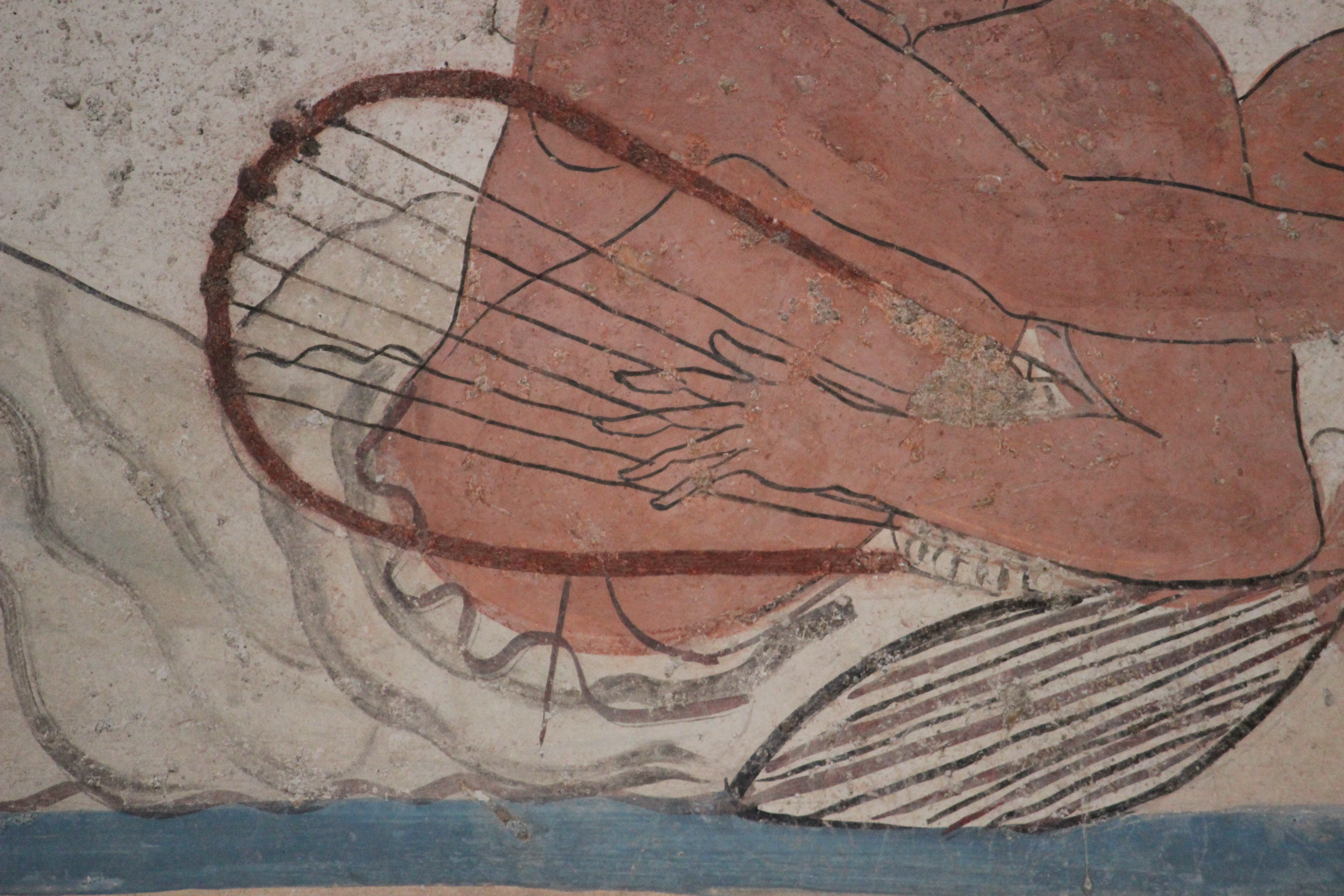
5th century BCE. Lyra or barbitos from the Tomb of the Diver.

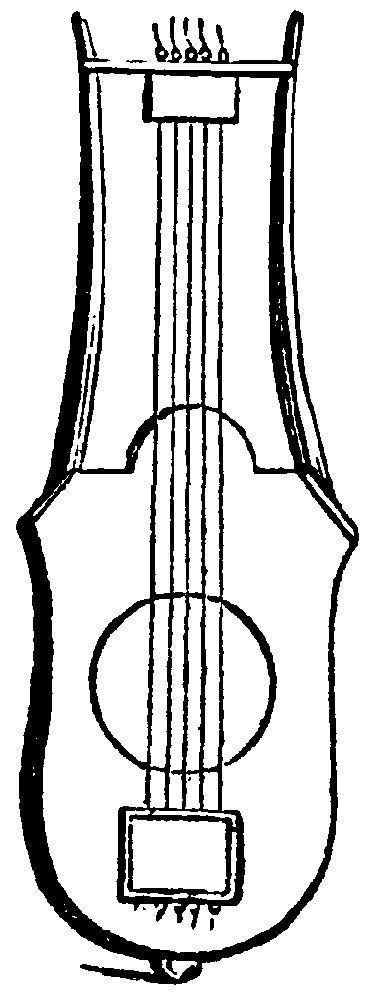
Barbitos in Nordisk familjebok (1904–1926). This lyre has features not seen in ancient artwork of lyres, especially the large circular soundhole.

=== String count ===
The Sicilian poet, Theocritus (xvi. 45), calls the barbitos an instrument of many strings, i.e. more than seven, which the Hellenes considered a perfect number, and matched the seven strings customary in the kithara.

=== Pitch ===
Anacreon (Note: Schlesinger (1911) cites: Bergk (1882) Poetae Lyrici Graeci, 4th ed., p. 291, fr. 143 [113]; and p. 311, 23 [1], 3; and 14 [9], 34, p. 306) (a native of Teos in Asia Minor) sings that his barbitos "only gives out erotic tones" – a remark which could have been metaphorical, but could also be a literal reference to the instrument's being tuned in the Greek harmonia called Ιαςτιαν (Iastian).

Pollux calls the barbiton a barymite instrument (from βάρυς, "heavy", and μίτος, "string"); both the literal and figurative meanings describing an instrument that produces very deep sounds. These would have been re-enforced by the barbiton's larger soundbox, compared to a kithara or a much smaller phorminx (folk lyre). The strings were twice as long as those of the phorminx and hence sounded about an octave lower.

Pindar (in Athen. xiv. p. 635), in the same line wherein he attributes the introduction of the instrument into Greece to Terpander, tells us one could magadize, i.e. play in two parts at an interval of an octave on the two instruments.

=== Popularity ===
Although in use in Asia Minor, Italy, Sicily, and Greece, it is evident that the barbiton never won for itself a place in the affections of ancient Greeks; it was regarded as a barbarian instrument affected by those only whose tastes in matters of art were exotic. It had fallen into disuse in the days of Aristotle, but reappeared under the Romans. (Note: See Schlesinger (1911) article "Lyre", p 1450, for more references to the classical authors.) The word barbiton was frequently used for the kithara or lyre.

=== Summary ===
In spite of the few meagre shreds of authentic information extant concerning this somewhat elusive instrument, it is possible nevertheless to identify the barbiton as it was known among the Greeks and Romans. From the Greek writers we know that it was a deep toned instrument, with pitch range of at least two octaves, that had enough features in common with the lyra and kithara, to warrant their classification as a family of related instruments.

== Barbat ==
A later, unrelated instrument, is described by the Persians and Arabs as a kind of rebab or lute, or a chelys-lyre, (Note: Schlesinger (1911) cites: Johnson's Persian-Arabic-English dictionary: barbat, a harp or lute, barbatzan, player upon lute, pl.barabit; barbal (Persian and Arabic), batbitus; genus testudinis, plerumque sex septamve chordis instructum (rotundam habet formam in Africa);) It was first introduced into Europe through Asia Minor by way of Greece, and centuries later into Spain by the Moors, amongst whom it was in the 14th century known as al-barbet. (Note: Schlesinger (1911) cites: Enumeration of Arab Musical Instruments. pp. xiv, c.)

At some period not yet determined, which we can but conjecture, the barbat approximated to the form of the large lute. The barbat is sometimes mistakenly translated as “barbiton”, but it is not like the instrument depicted on Greek vase paintings.

=== The real barbat ===
The barbat was a variety of rebab, a bass instrument, differing only in size and number of strings. This is quite in accordance with what we know of the nomenclature of musical instruments among Persians and Arabs, with whom a slight deviation in the construction of an instrument warranted a new name. (Note: Schlesinger (1911) cites: See Lucknow (1822); A review of this book in German with copious quotations by von Hammer-Purgstall (1826) See also Kiesewetter (1843), p. 91)

The word barbud applied to the barbiton is said to be derived (Note: Schlesinger (1911) cites: The Seven Seas, part i, p. 153; and Jahrb. d. Literatur, Bd. 36, p. 294.) from a famous musician living at the time of Chosroes II (590–628 CE), who excelled in playing the instrument. From a later translation of part of the same author into German, Schlesinger (1911), p. 80 specifically lists barbut (German: barbiton) and rubāb (German: laute), as Persian names of two distinct instruments. (Note: Schlesinger (1911) cites Ruckert (1874), p. 80 from which he obtained the following reference to Persian musical instruments: Die Sänger stehen bei seinem Gastmahl; in ihrer Hand Barbiton,^{(i)} und Leyer,^{(ii)} und Laute,^{(iii)} und Flöte,^{(iv)} und Deff (Handpauke). Mr. Ellis, of the Oriental Department of the British Museum, has kindly supplied the original Persian names translated above, i.e. (i) barbut, (ii) chang, (iii) rubāb, (iv nei.) The barbut and rubab thus were different instruments in Persian as late as 1874. There were only slight differences, if any, between the rebab and the lute before rebab became a bowed instrument: Before that point, both had vaulted backs, a pear-shaped body and joined neck, and gut strings, originally plucked by the fingers.

=== The barbat is not a Greek barbiton ===
The Greek barbiton, however, although it underwent many changes, retained until the end the characteristics of the instruments of the Greek kithara / lyra family, whose strings were strummed and plucked, whereas the rebab was sounded by means of the bow at the time of its introduction into Europe.

The instrument called barbiton was known in the early part of the 16th century (Note: Schlesinger (1911) cites: Jacob Locher (Basil, 1506) Navis Stultifera, titulus 7, illustration of a small harp and lute with the legend nec cytharum tangit nec barbiton.) and during the 17th century. It was a kind of theorbo or bass-lute, but with one neck only, bent back at right angles to form the head. Robert Fludd (Note: Schlesinger (1911) cites: Robert Fludd (Oppenheim, 1617) Historia Utriusque Cosmi, tom. i. tract ii. part ii. lib. iv. cap. i. p. 226.) gives a detailed description of it with an illustration:

Inter quas instrumenta non nulla barbito simillima effinxerunt cujus modi sunt illa quae vulgo appellantur theorba, quae sonos graviores reddunt chordasque nervosas habent.

Ordinary people called it a theorbo (vulgo appellantur theorba), but Fludd identified it with the instrument of classic Greece and Rome and called it a "barbiton" (barbito). This theorbo / barbiton had nine pairs of gut strings, each pair in unison.

Dictionaries of the 18th century follow Fludd's use of the name "barbiton". G. B. Doni (Note: Schlesinger (1911) cites: Lyra Barberina, vol. ii. index, and also vol. i. p. 29.) mentions the barbiton, defining it in his index as Barbitos seu major chelys italice tiorba, and deriving it from lyre and cithara in common with testudines, tiorbas and all tortoiseshell instruments. Claude Perrault, (Note: Schlesinger (1911) cites: Claude Perrault (Amsterdam, 1727) "La musique des anciens", Oeuvres complètes, tom. i. p. 306.) writing in the 18th century, states that "les modernes appellent notre luth barbiton" (the moderns call our lute barbiton). Constantijn Huygens (Note: Schlesinger (1911) cites: Constantijn Huygens (Haarlem, 1817) De Vita propria sermonum inter liberos libri duo. See also Edmund van der Straeten, La Musique aux Pays-Bas, vol. ii. p. 349.) writes that he learnt to play the "barbiton" in a few weeks, but that it took two years to learn the cittern.

== Modern sound reconstruction ==
The Greek barbitos is part of the Lost Sounds Orchestra, alongside other ancient instruments which Ancient Instruments Sound/Timbre Reconstruction Application (ASTRA) have recreated the sounds of, including the epigonion, the salpinx, the aulos, and the syrinx.

The sounds of the barbitos are being digitally recreated by the ASTRA project, which uses Physical modeling synthesis to simulate the barbitos sounds. Due to the complexity of this process the ASTRA project uses grid computing, to model sounds on hundreds of computers throughout Europe simultaneously.

== Mysterious third, unnamed, mixed lyre / rebab ==
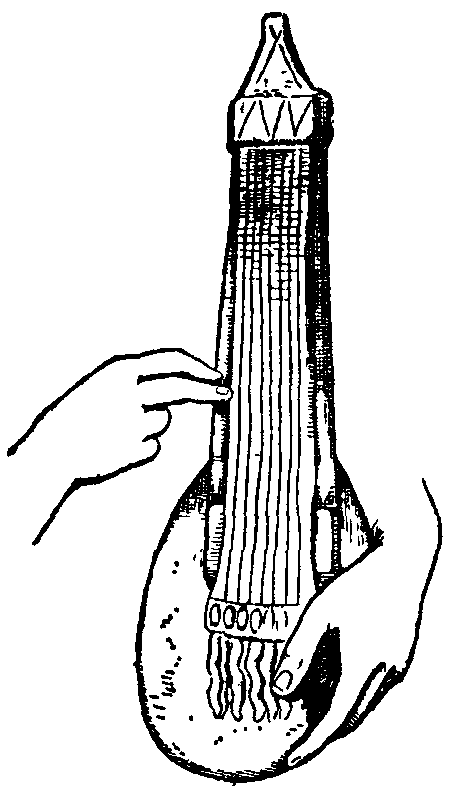
Barbiton, from a bas-relief in the Louvre, Achilles at Scyros.

Musicologist Kathleen Schlesinger identified a stringed instrument of unknown name that combines the characteristics of both lyre and rebab; It is represented in least four different ancient sculptures: (Note: Schlesinger (1911) cites: (a) See C. Clarac, Musée du Louvre, vol. i. pl. 202, no. 261. (b) Accompanying illustration. [See also Kathleen Schlesinger, "Orchestral Instruments", part ii., "Precursors of the Violin Family," fig. 108 and p. 23, pp. 106–107, fig. 144 and appendix.] (c) Sarcophagus in the cathedral of Girgenti in Sicily, illustrated by Carl Engel, Early History of the Violon Family, p. 112. A cast of preserved in the sepulchral basement at the British Museum. Domenico (Palermo, 1834) Lo Faso Pietra-Santa, le antichrita della Sicilia, vol. 3, pl. 45 (2), text p. 89. (d) C. Zoega (Giessen, 1812) Antike Basreliefe von Rom, atlas, pl. 98, sarcophagus representing a scene in the story of Hippolytus and Phaedra.) She writes:

It has the vaulted back and gradual narrowing to form a neck which are typical of the rebab and the stringing of the lyre. In outline it resembles a large lute with a wide neck, and the seven strings of the lyre of the best period, or sometimes nine, following the “decadent lyre”. Most authors in reproducing these sculptures showing it represent the instrument as boat-shaped and without a neck, as, for instance, Carl Engel. This is because the part of the instrument where neck joins body is in deep shadow, so that the correct outline can hardly be distinguished, being almost hidden by hand on one side and drapery on the other.

== See also ==
- Lyre
- Kithara
- Phorminx
