= Dithyramb =

Literary and music genre

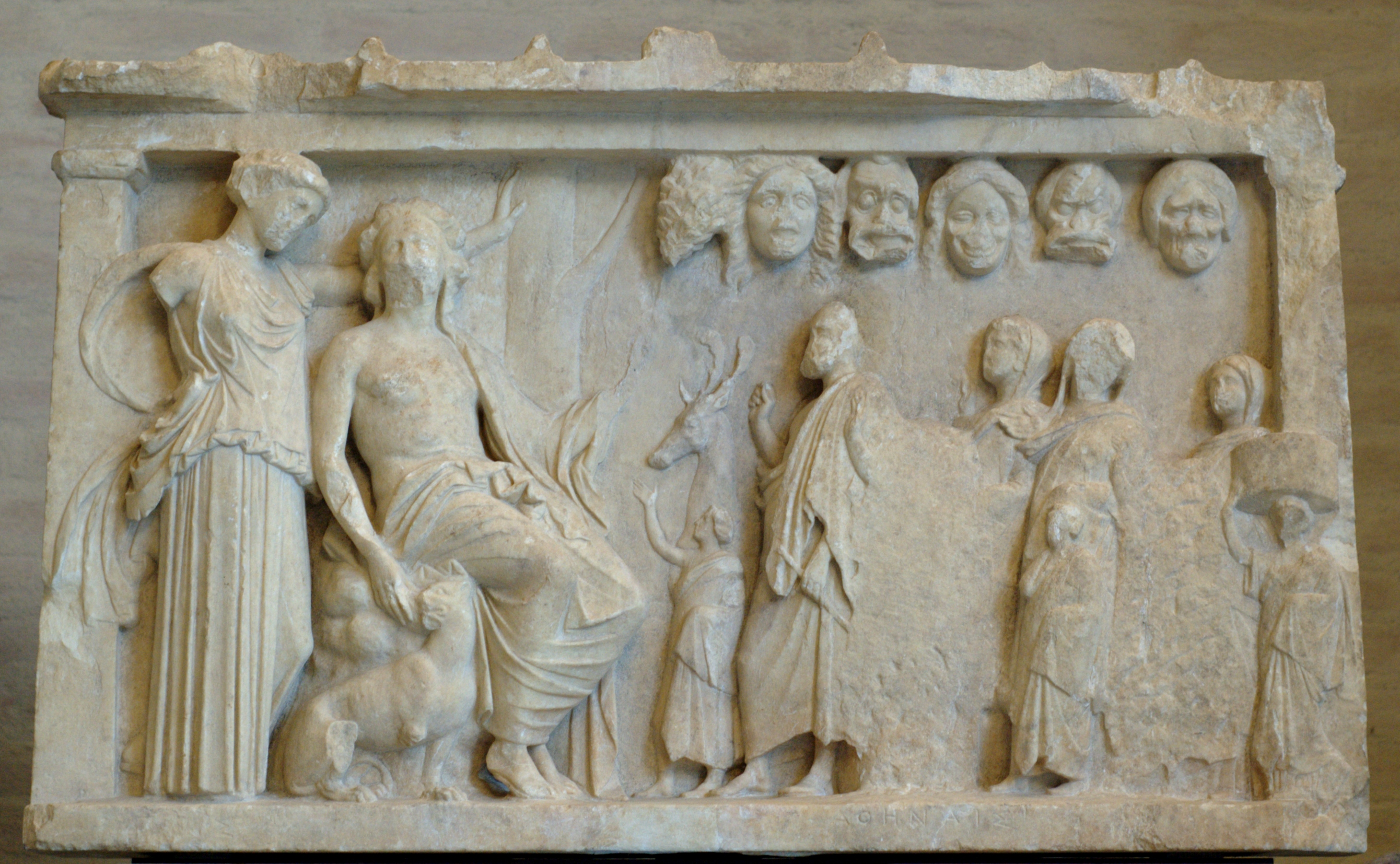
Attic relief (4th century BCE) depicting an aulos player and his family standing before Dionysos and a female consort, with theatrical masks displayed above

The dithyramb (/ˈdɪθɪræm/; Ancient Greek: διθύραμβος, dithyrambos) is an ancient Greek hymn sung and danced in honor of Dionysus, the god of wine and fertility; the term is also used as an epithet of the god. Plato, in The Laws, while discussing various kinds of music mentions "the birth of Dionysos, called, I think, the dithyramb." Plato also remarks in the Republic that dithyrambs are the clearest example of poetry in which the poet is the only speaker.

However, in The Apology Socrates went to the dithyrambic poets with some of their own most elaborate passages, asking their meaning, but got a response of, "Will you believe me?" which "showed me in an instant that not by wisdom do poets write poetry, but by a sort of genius and inspiration; they are like diviners or soothsayers who also say many fine things, but do not understand the meaning of them."

Plutarch contrasted the dithyramb's wild and ecstatic character with the paean. According to Aristotle, the dithyramb was the origin of Athenian tragedy. A wildly enthusiastic speech or piece of writing is still occasionally described as dithyrambic.

== History ==
Dithyrambs were sung by choirs at Delos, but the literary fragments that have survived are largely Athenian. In Athens, dithyrambs were sung by a Greek chorus of up to fifty men or boys dancing in circular formation, who may or may not have been dressed as Satyrs, probably accompanied by the aulos. They would normally relate some incident in the life of Dionysus or just celebrate wine and fertility.

The ancient Greeks laid out the criteria of the dithyramb as follows:

- special rhythm
- aulos accompaniment in Phrygian mode
- enriching text
- considerable narrative content
- originally antistrophic character

Competitions between groups, singing and dancing dithyrambs were an important part of the festivals of Dionysus, such as the Dionysia and Lenaia. Each tribe would enter two choirs, one of men and one of boys, each under the leadership of a coryphaeus. The names of the winning teams of dithyrambic contests in Athens were recorded. The successful choregos would receive a statue that would be erected—at his expense—as a public monument to commemorate the victory. However, most of the poets remain unknown.

The earliest mention of dithyramb, found by Sir Arthur Wallace Pickard-Cambridge, is in a fragment of Archilochus, who flourished in the first half of the seventh century BCE: "I know how to lead the fair song of the Lord Dionysus, the dithyramb, when my wits are fused with wine." As a literary composition for chorus, their inspiration is unknown, although it was likely Greek, as Herodotus explicitly speaks of Arion of Lesbos as "the first of men we know to have composed the dithyramb and named it and produced it in Corinth."

The word dithyramb has no known origin, but is frequently assumed not to be derived from Greek. An old hypothesis is that the word is borrowed from Phrygian or Pelasgian, and literally means "Vierschritt", i. e., "four-step", compare iamb and thriambus, but H. S. Versnel rejects this etymology and suggests instead a derivation from a cultic exclamation. Dithyrambs were composed by the poets Simonides and Bacchylides, as well as Pindar (the only one whose works have survived in anything like their original form).

Later examples were dedicated to other gods, but the dithyramb subsequently was developed (traditionally by Arion) into a literary form. According to Aristotle, Athenian tragedy developed from the dithyramb; the two forms developed alongside one another for some time. The clearest sense of dithyramb as proto-tragedy comes from a surviving dithyramb by Bacchylides, though it was composed after tragedy had already developed fully. Bacchylides' dithyramb is a dialogue between a solitary singer and a choir. It is suggestive of what tragedy may have resembled before Aeschylus added a second actor instead of the choir.

In the later 5th century BCE, the dithyramb "became a favorite vehicle for the musical experiments of the poets of the 'new music'." This movement included the poets Timotheus of Miletus, Cinesias, Melanippides, and Philoxenus of Cythera. By the 4th century BCE the genre was in decline, although the dithyrambic competitions did not come to an end until well after the Roman takeover of Greece.

== Modern examples ==
Dithyrambs are rare in English language literature. In German literature they appear more frequently, and from the 19th century several compositions were inspired by them.

=== Literature ===
John Dryden's "Alexander's Feast" (1697) is a notable example of an English language dithyramb.

Friedrich Schiller wrote a Dithyrambe in 1796. Friedrich Nietzsche composed a set of Dionysos-Dithyramben in 1888/89. The poetry cycle Dithyrambischer Herbst by Austrian poet Alfred Grünewald was published in 1920.

=== Music and dance ===
From the 19th century dithyrambs appear frequently in classical music, as well in vocal as instrumental compositions.

Franz Schubert wrote a song for bass voice based on Schiller's Dithyrambe (D 801, published as Op. 60 No. 2 in 1826). Schubert's earlier attempt at setting the same poem for a more extended vocal ensemble had remained unfinished (D 47, 1813). Schubert's Fantasie in C Major, Op. 15 (D.760), often called the "Wanderer Fantasy", was referred to as "the splendid Wanderer-Dithyramb" by Franz Liszt in his letter to Professor Siegmund Lebert of December 2, 1868. Johann Friedrich Reichardt (in Schillers lyrische Gedichte volume 2, published around 1809) and Wilhelm Taubert (Op. 144 No. 2, 1864) were other composers setting Schiller's poem. Other composers basing vocal music on dithyrambs include Giuseppe Verdi ("Brindisi", No. 6 of his 1845 Album di Sei Romanze), and Max Bruch (Op. 39, c. 1871). Othmar Schoeck's 1911 Dithyrambe, Op. 22 is based on an unnamed verse by Goethe.

Instrumental dithyrambs were composed by Robert Volkmann and Hermann Ritter. Nikolai Medtner composed several dithyrambs, including a set of three for solo piano as his Opus 10. Additionally, the final movement of his first violin sonata carries the title, and the last of his Vergessene Weisen Op. 40 is a Danza ditirambica.

The last movement of Igor Stravinsky's Duo Concertant for violin and piano is entitled Dithyrambe. Richard Edward Wilson's 1983 Dithyramb is for oboe and clarinet. Wolfgang Rihm composed a 30-minute work, Concerto, in 2000, with the subtitle Dithyrambe and a scoring for string quartet and orchestra.

In 1961 the American choreographer James Waring created a dance piece entitled Dithyramb with music and objects by the Fluxus artist George Brecht.

The Swedish composer, Ture Rangström, 1884–1947, wrote an early symphonic poem, "Dithyramb" in 1909, revised in 1948 by Kurt Atterberg.

== See also ==
- Iambus (genre)
- Thriambus

== Sources ==
- Armand D'Angour: "How the Dithyramb Got Its Shape." Classical Quarterly 47 (1997) 331–351.
- Feder, Lillian (1998). The Handbook Of Classical Literature. Da Capo Press. ISBN 978-0-306-80880-7.
- E. D. d Francis (1990). Image and Idea in Fifth Century Greece: Art and Literature After the Persian Wars. Routledge. ISBN 978-0-415-01914-9.
- Gosse, Edmund William (1911). "Dithyrambic Poetry" . Encyclopædia Britannica. Vol. 8 (11th ed.). pp. 323–324.
- Jane Ellen Harrison (1922). Prolegomena to the Study of Greek Religion. Princeton University Press. ISBN 978-0-691-01514-9.
- Harvey, A. E. 1955. "The Classification of Greek Lyric Poetry." Classical Quarterly 5.
- Aristóteles (1987). Poetics I. Hackett Publishing. ISBN 978-0-87220-033-3.
- Pickard-Cambridge, Sir Arthur Wallace. 1927. Dithyramb Tragedy and Comedy. Second edition revised by T.B.L. Webster, 1962. Oxford: Oxford University Press, 1997. ISBN 0-19-814227-7.
- —. 1946. The Theatre of Dionysus in Athens.
- —. 1953. The Dramatic Festivals of Athens.
- Sourvinou-Inwood, Christiane. 2003. Tragedy and Athenian Religion. Oxford: Oxford UP.
- Constantine Athanasius Trypanis (1981). Greek Poetry: From Homer to Seferis. Chicago : University of Chicago Press. ISBN 978-0-226-81316-5.
- Wiles, David (2004). The Masks of Menander: Sign and Meaning in Greek and Roman Performance. Cambridge University Press. ISBN 978-0-521-54352-1.
