= Thriambus =

Hymn to Dionysus,

A thriambus (also spelled thriamb, thriambas, or thriambos; Greek θρίαμβος) is a hymn to Dionysus, sung in processions in his honour, and at the same time an epithet of the god himself, according to Diodorus (4.5.2):

Thriambus is a name that has been given him, they say, because he was the first of those of whom we have a record to have celebrated a triumph (thriambos) upon entering his native land after his campaign, this having been done when he returned from India with great booty.

It was loaned into Old Latin via Etruscan as triumpus, in Classical Latin taking the form triumphus, the Roman triumph where the victorious general takes the role of Dionysus as leader of the procession, later associated with Iuppiter rather than Dionysus. Arrian traces the custom to Alexander the Great when he states (Anabasis 6b.28):

Certain authors have said (though to me the statement seems incredible) that Alexander led his forces through Carmania lying extended with his Companions upon two covered waggons joined together, the flute being played to him; and that the soldiers followed him wearing garlands and sporting. Food was provided for them, as well as all kinds of dainties which had been brought together along the roads by the Carmanians. They say that he did this in imitation of the Bacchic revelry of Dionysus, because a story was told about that deity, that after subduing the Indians he traversed the greater part of Asia in this manner and received the appellation of Thriambus, and that for the same reason the processions in honour of victories after war were called thriambi.

The term's etymology is connected with the word θρῖον "fig leaf" by Aemilius Luetcke (1829) who refers to the epithet Συκίτης "of the fig tree" of Dionysus.

An old hypothesis is that the word is borrowed from Phrygian or Pelasgian, and literally means "Dreischritt", i. e., "three-step", compare iamb and dithyramb, but H. S. Versnel rejects this etymology and suggests instead a derivation from a cultic exclamation.

From the time of Roman Greece (2nd century BC), the Greek term increasingly narrows to a translation of Latin triumphus. In Modern Greek, θρίαμβος is used in the same generalized meaning as English triumph.

== See also ==
- Bacchanalia
- Dithyramb
- Iamb
- Roman triumph
