= Phorminx =

Type of musical instrument

Phorminx is also a genus of cylindrical bark beetles.

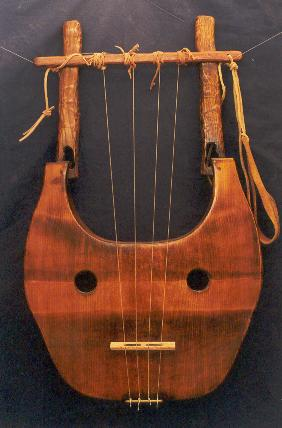
A phorminx

The phorminx (Ancient Greek: φόρμιγξ) was one of the oldest of the Ancient Greek stringed musical instruments, in the yoke lutes family, intermediate between the lyre and the kithara. It consisted of two to seven strings, richly decorated arms and a crescent-shaped sound box. It most probably originated from Mesopotamia. While it seems to have been common in Homer's day accompanying the rhapsodes, it was supplanted in historical times by the seven-stringed kithara. Nevertheless, the term "phorminx" continued to be used as an archaism in poetry.

The term "phorminx" is also sometimes used in both ancient and modern writing to refer to all four instruments of the lyre family collectively:

- Barbitos
- Kithara
- Lyre
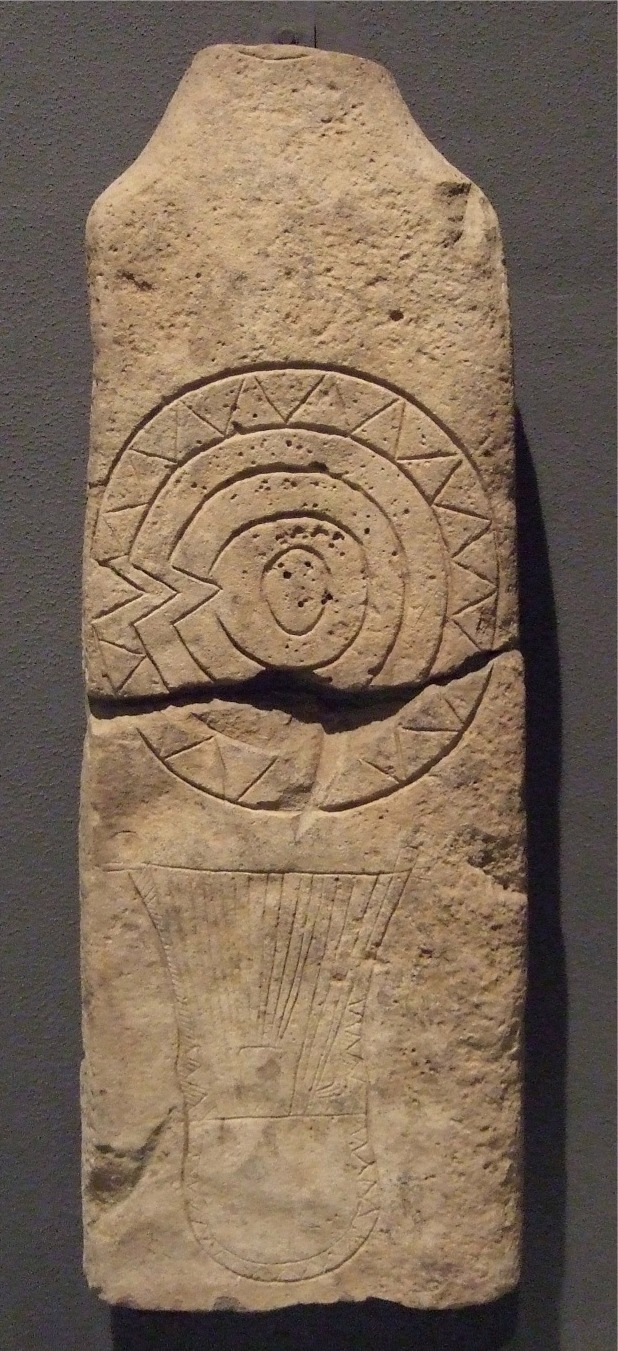
1250-750 B.C., Zargoza, Spain. Lyre in Spain similar to phorminx, engraved on the Funerary stela of Valpamas.
