= Terpander =

7th-century BC Greek poet

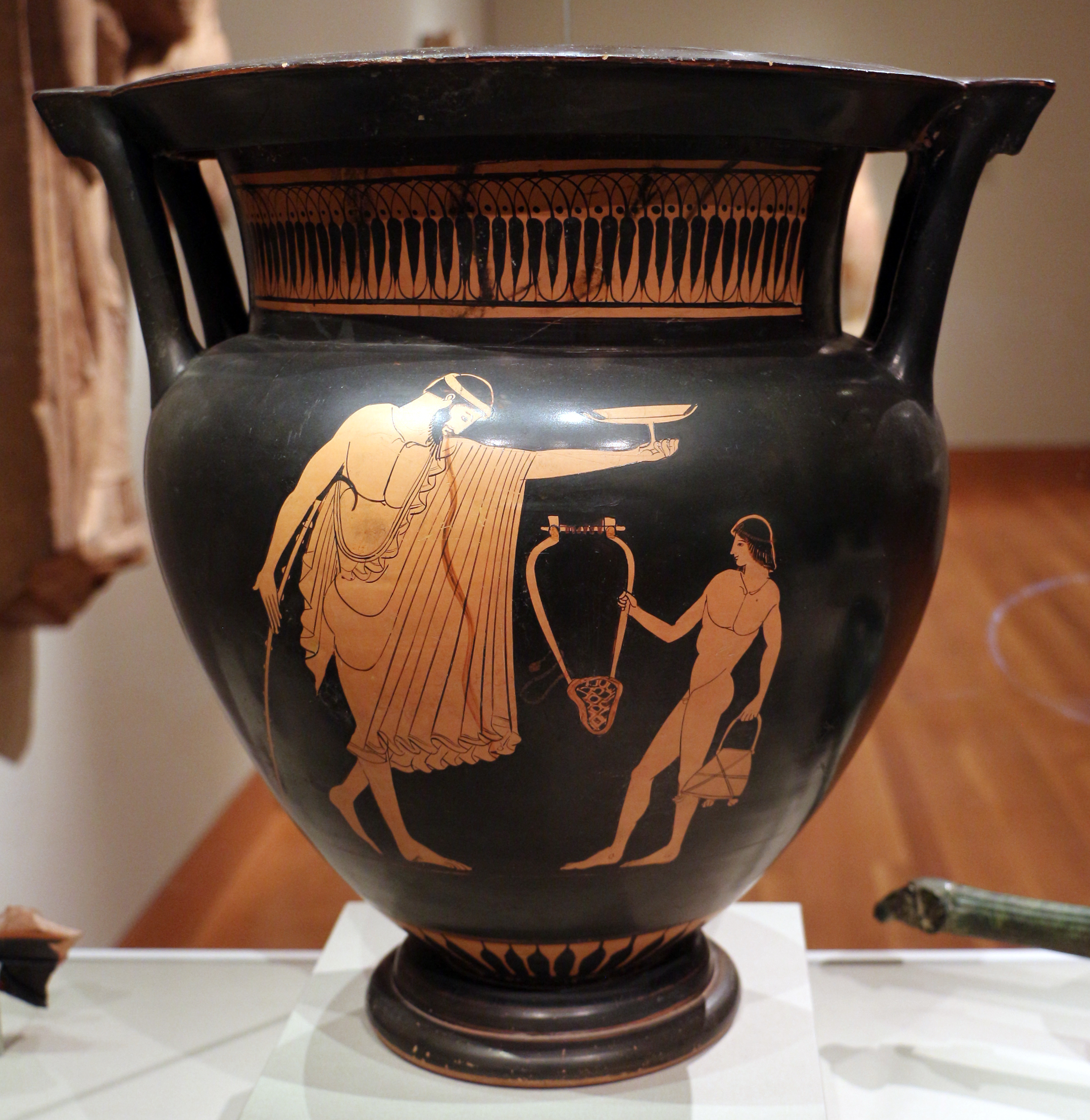
A citharede

Terpander (Ancient Greek: Τέρπανδρος Terpandros), of Antissa in Lesbos, was a Greek poet and citharede who lived about the first half of the 7th century BC. He was the father of Greek music and through it, of lyric poetry, although his own poetical compositions were few and in extremely simple rhythms. He simplified rules of the modes of singing of other neighboring countries and islands and formed, out of these syncopated variants, a conceptual system. Though endowed with an inventive mind, and the commencer of a new era of music, he attempted no more than to systematize the musical styles that existed in the music of Greece and Anatolia. Terpander is perhaps the earliest historically certain figure in the music of Ancient Greece.

== Biography ==
He gained a reputation as a singer and composer, but after having killed a man in a brawl, he was exiled.

About the time of the Second Messenian War, he settled in Sparta, to where, according to some accounts, he had been summoned by command of the Delphic Oracle to settle the differences that had arisen between different classes in the state. Here he gained the prize in the musical contests at the festival of Carneia.

He is regarded as the real founder of Greek classical music and lyric poetry, but as to his innovations in music, our information is imperfect. According to Strabo, he increased the number of strings in the lyre from four to seven; others take the fragment of Terpander on which Strabo bases his statement to mean that he developed the citharoedic nomos (sung to the accompaniment of the cithara or lyre) by making the divisions of the ode seven instead of four. The seven-stringed lyre was probably already in existence. Terpander is also said to have introduced several new rhythms in addition to the dactylic and to have been famous as a composer of drinking-songs (skolia).

No poems attributed to Terpander survive complete, and very few lines of his are quoted by later Greek writers; it must be regarded as doubtful whether any of his work was recorded in writing.

Terpander is said to have died, around Skiades ("shady place" of the Carneia), by choking on a fig when the fruit was thrown in appreciation of one of his performances.

== See also ==
- Orpheus
- Pericleitus, a pupil of Terpander
- Philammon
- Chrysothemis
- Piorian Maenads
