= Kithara =

Ancient Greek musical instrument

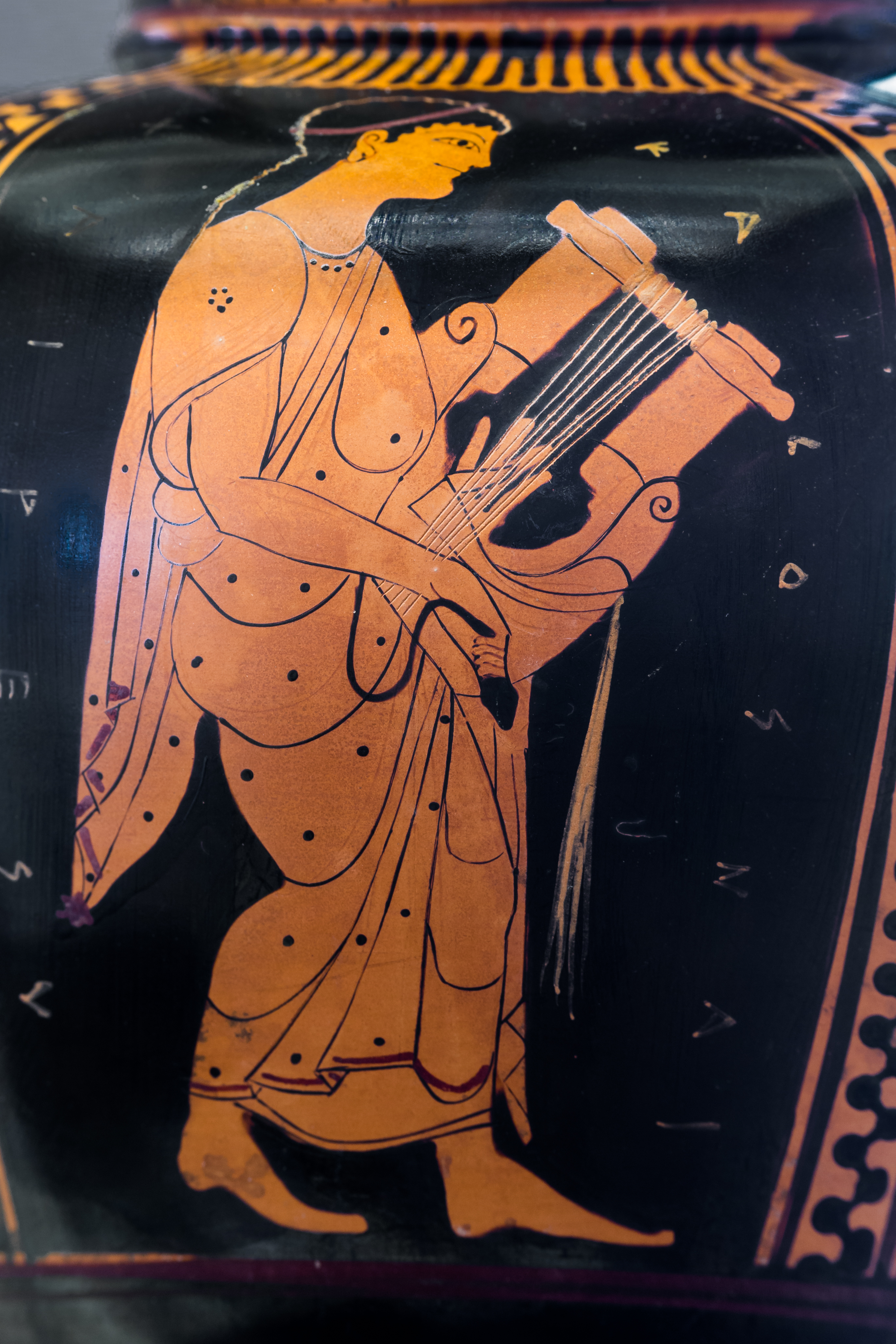
Young kithara player, in costume, by the Goluchow painter; Athens, c. 520 BCE

The kithara (Greek: κιθάρα, romanized: kithára), Latinized as cithara, was an ancient Greek musical instrument in the yoke lutes family. It was a seven-stringed professional version of the lyre, which was regarded as a rustic, or folk instrument, appropriate for teaching music to beginners. As opposed to the simpler lyre, the cithara was primarily used by professional musicians, called kitharodes. In modern Greek, the word kithara has come to mean "guitar"; etymologically, the word guitar derives from kithara.

== Origin and uses ==
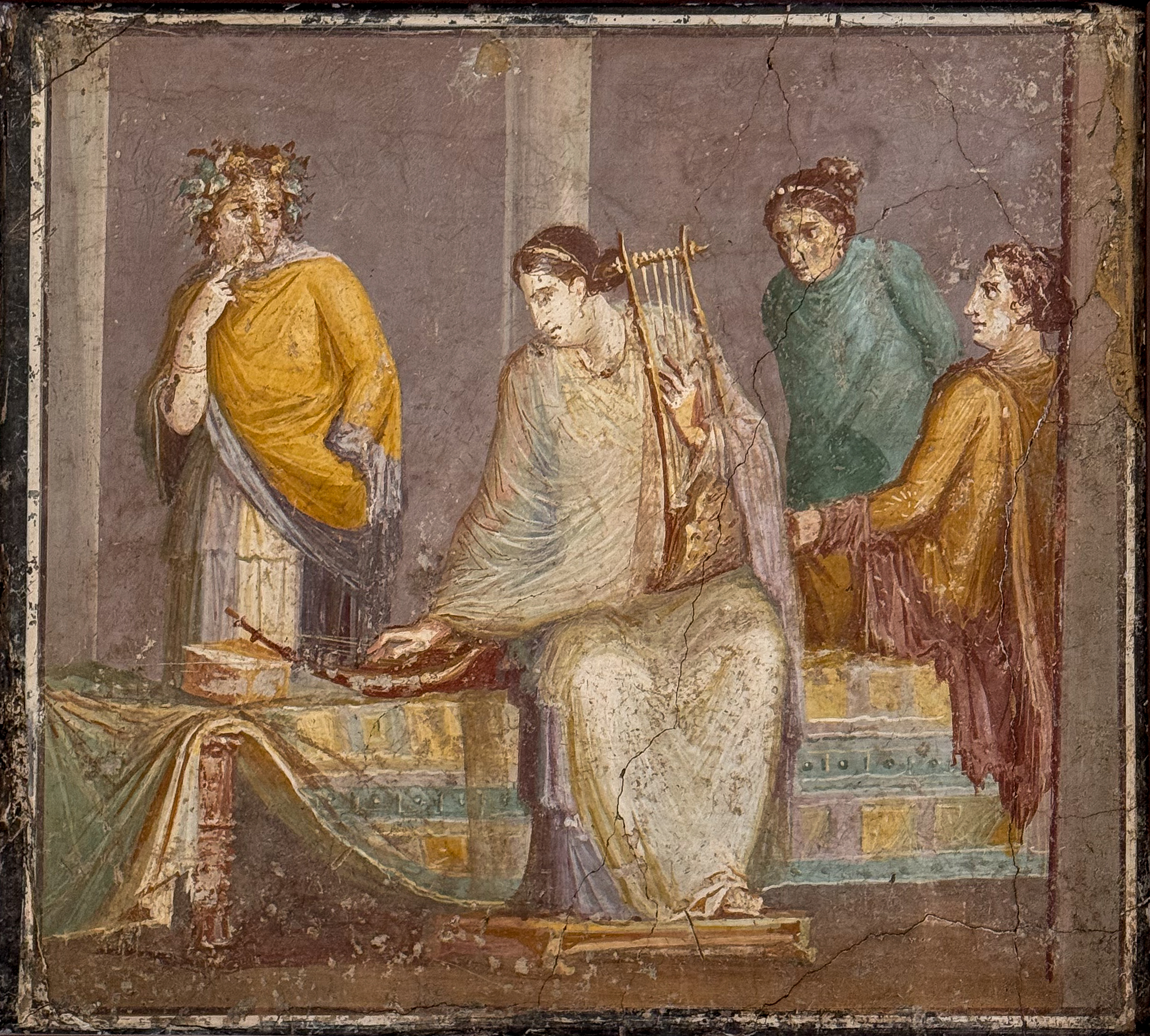
Ancient Roman fresco depicting women in a peristyle, listening to another woman play a kithara and sambuca.

The cithara originated from Minoan-Mycenaean swan-neck lyres developed and used during the Aegean Bronze Age. Scholars such as M.L. West, Martha Maas, and Jane M. Snyder have made connections between the cithara and stringed instruments from ancient Anatolia.

Whereas the basic lyra was widely used as a teaching instrument in boys’ schools, the cithara was a virtuoso's instrument and generally known as requiring a great deal of skill. The cithara was played primarily to accompany dance, epic recitations, rhapsodies, odes, and lyric songs. It was also played solo at the receptions, banquets, national games, and trials of skill. Aristotle said that these string instruments were not for educational purposes but for pleasure only. It was played by strumming the strings with a stiff plectrum made of dried leather, held in the right hand with elbow outstretched and palm bent inwards. The strings with undesired notes were damped with the straightened fingers of the left hand.

== Construction ==
The cithara had a deep, wooden sound box composed of two resonating tables, either flat or slightly arched, connected by ribs or sides of equal width. At the top, its strings were knotted around the crossbar or yoke (zugon) or to rings threaded over the bar, or wound around pegs. The other ends of the strings were secured to a tail-piece after passing over a flat bridge, or the tail-piece and bridge were combined.

Most vase paintings show citharas with seven strings, in agreement with ancient authors, but those same authors also mention that occasionally an especially skillful kitharode would use more than the conventional seven strings.

== Apollo as a kitharode ==
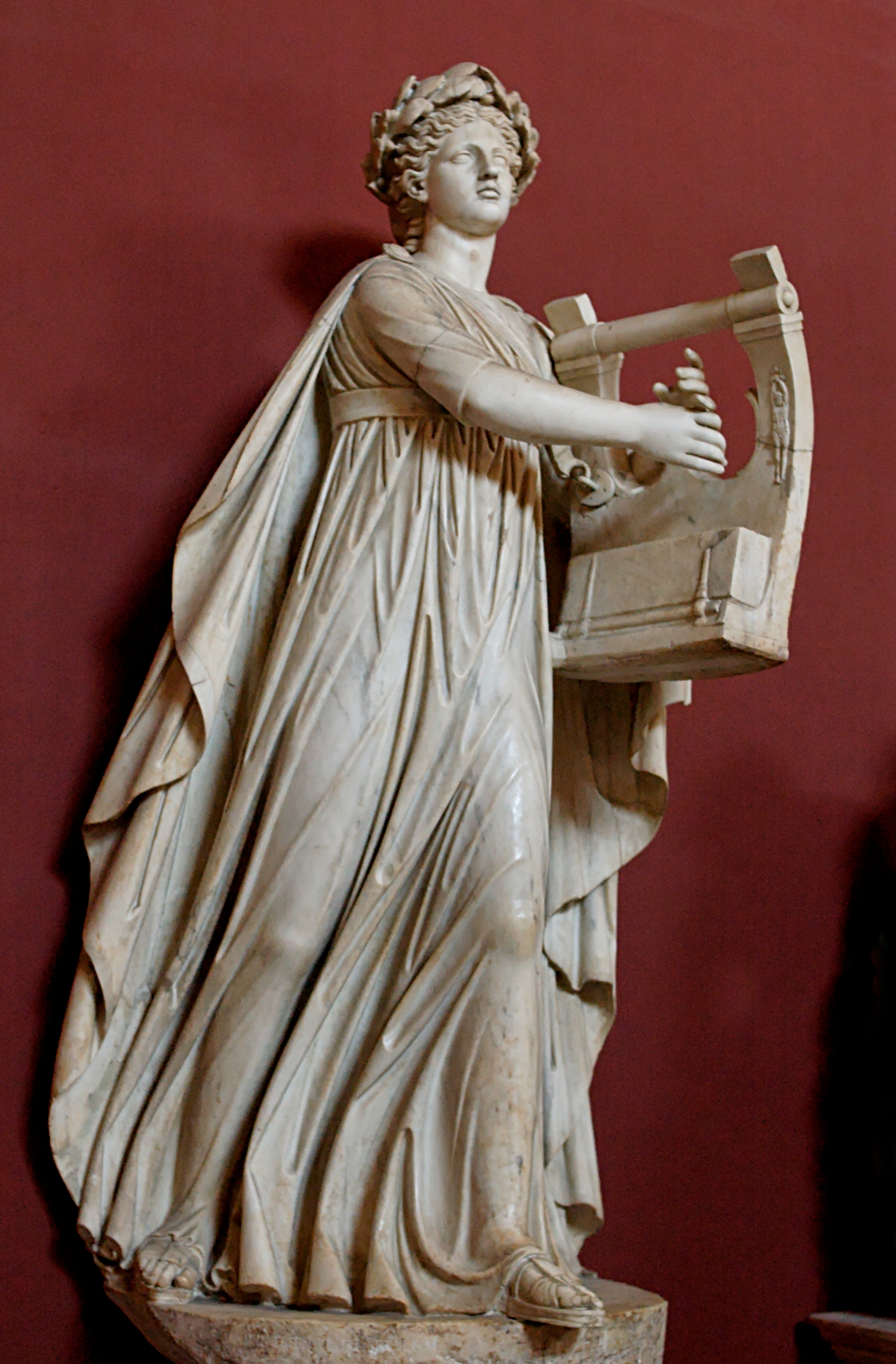
Apollo kitharoidos (Apollo holding a cithara and wearing the customary kitharōdos’ robes) and musagetes (leader of the Muses). Marble, Roman artwork, 2nd century CE.

The cithara is said to have been the invention of Apollo, the god of music. Apollo is often depicted playing a cithara instead of a lyre, often dressed in a kitharode’s formal robes. Kitharoidos, or Citharoedus, is an epithet given to Apollo, which means "cithara-singer" or "one who sings to the cithara".

An Apollo Citharoedus or Apollo Citharede, is the term for a type of statue or other image of Apollo with a cithara. Among the best-known examples is the Apollo Citharoedus at the Vatican Museums, a colossal marble statue of the 2nd century CE by an unknown Roman sculptor.

== Famous cithara players ==
- Phrynnis (Ancient Greek: Φρῦνις) of Lesbos: The Suda mentions that Phrynnis was the first to play the cithara at Athens and won at the Panathenaea; by cithara is probably meant the new 12-stringed instrument invented by Melanippides of Melos.
- Athenodoros of Teos, who played at the Susa weddings of Alexander the Great
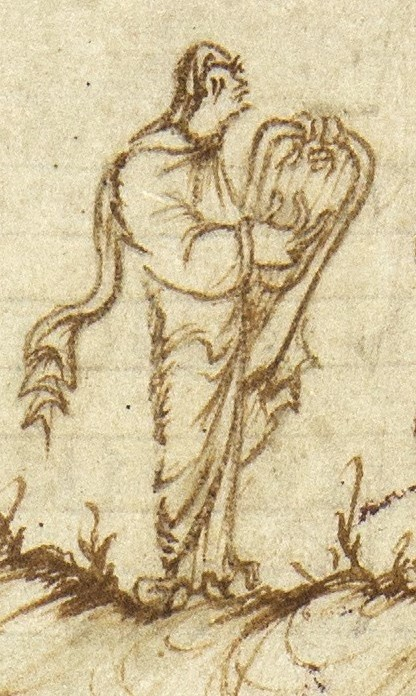
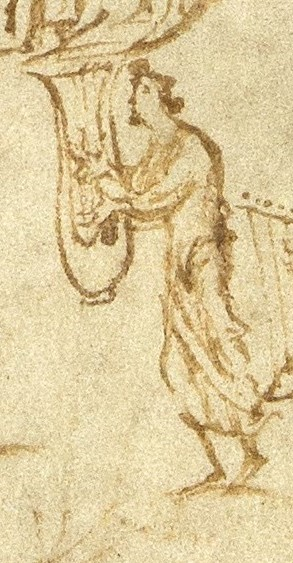
Two sketches of string instrument players (citharas, lyres or rottas?) from the Utrecht Psalter, drawn by an Anglo-Saxon artist in Reims, c. 850 CE.

== Other instruments called "cithara" ==
In the Middle Ages, cythara was also used generically for stringed instruments, including lyres, but also including lute-like instruments. (Note: "Cithara was the Latin name for the Greek kithara, a lyre-like instrument. It was often used as a generic term for 'plucked stringed instrument' by writers discussing a variety of instruments in medieval and Renaissance times, but when a player used this name for his instrument, [...] he was probably making a claim that his instrument was the one that had the magic to readily manipulate the listener's emotional states as the original kithara (with a similar large plectrum) had a reputation of doing, to the ancient Greeks.") (Note: "There is evidence of citharae shaped like a lute, that is with a neck and an elongated body, even before the twelfth century: the Golden Psalter of St. Gall depicts King David wielding an instrument that has a broad neck, a circular pegbox (without pegs depicted), and three strings, and whose total length is three times as long as its body, which is of a circular shape. This instrument resembles a lute more than a cithara, but it is associated with David. Further evidence appears in The Stuttgart Psalter [...] This psalter contains several images of an instrument having a long neck and a narrow body with parallel sides, sloping shoulders, and a pear-shaped pegbox. In the text, next to all these miniatures, the instrument is called a cithara.") The use of the name throughout the Middle Ages looked back to the original Greek kithara, and its abilities to sway people's emotions.

== Biblical references ==
An instrument called the kinnor is mentioned a number of times in the Bible, generally translated into English as "harp" or "psaltery", but historically rendered as "cithara". Psalm 42 in the Latin Vulgate (Psalm 43 in other versions), says,

"Confitebor tibi in cithara, Deus, Deus meus,"

which is translated in the Douay-Rheims version as

"To thee, O God my God, I will give praise upon the harp."

The King James version renders this verse as

"Yea, upon the harp will I praise thee, O God my God."

The cithara is also mentioned in other places in the Latin Vulgate version of the Bible, including Genesis 4:21, 1 Kings (1 Samuel) 16:16, 1 Paralipomenon (1 Chronicles) 25:3, Job 30:31, Psalms 32:2, Psalms 56:9, Psalms 70:22, Psalms 80:3, Psalms 91:4, Psalms 98:5, Psalms 107:3, Psalms 146:7, Psalms 150:3, Isaiah 5:12, Isaiah 16:11, 1 Machabees 3:45, 1 Corinthians 14:7, Revelation 5:8 and 15.2.

The kaithros mentioned in the Book of Daniel may have been the same instrument.

== Gallery ==
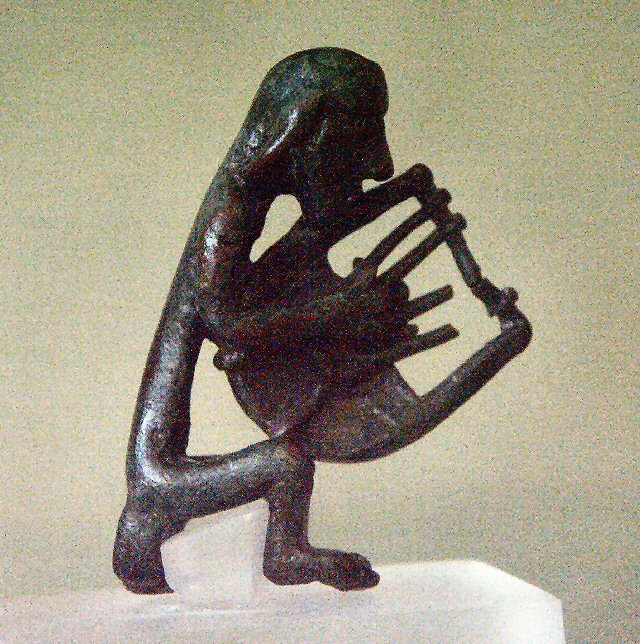
Bronze figurine from Crete, c. 850 BCE

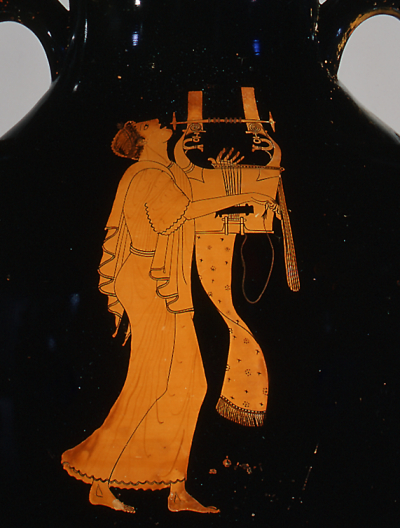
Kithara player by the Berlin Painter c. 490 BCE

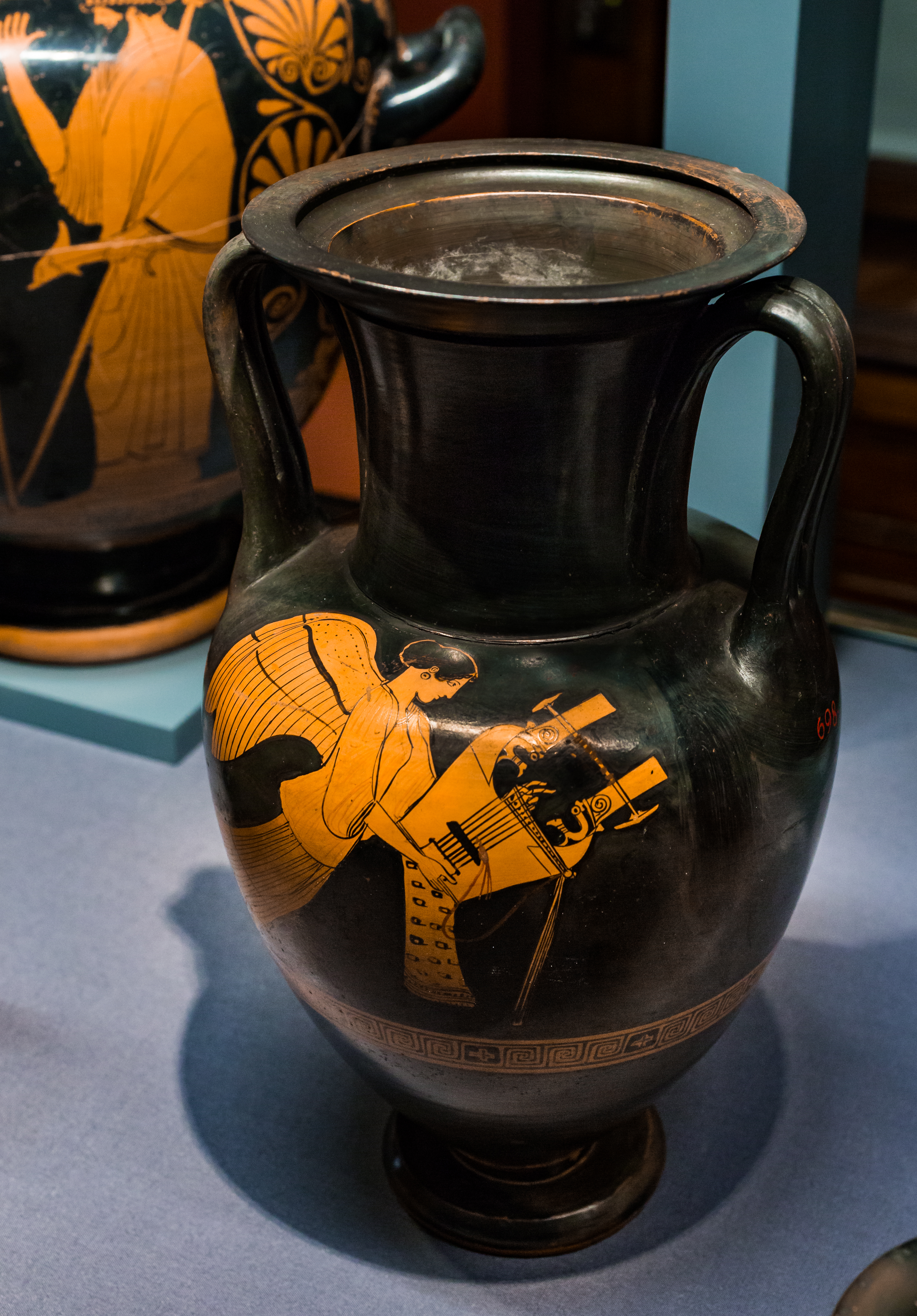
Nike flying with kithara by the Providence Painter, c. 480 BCE

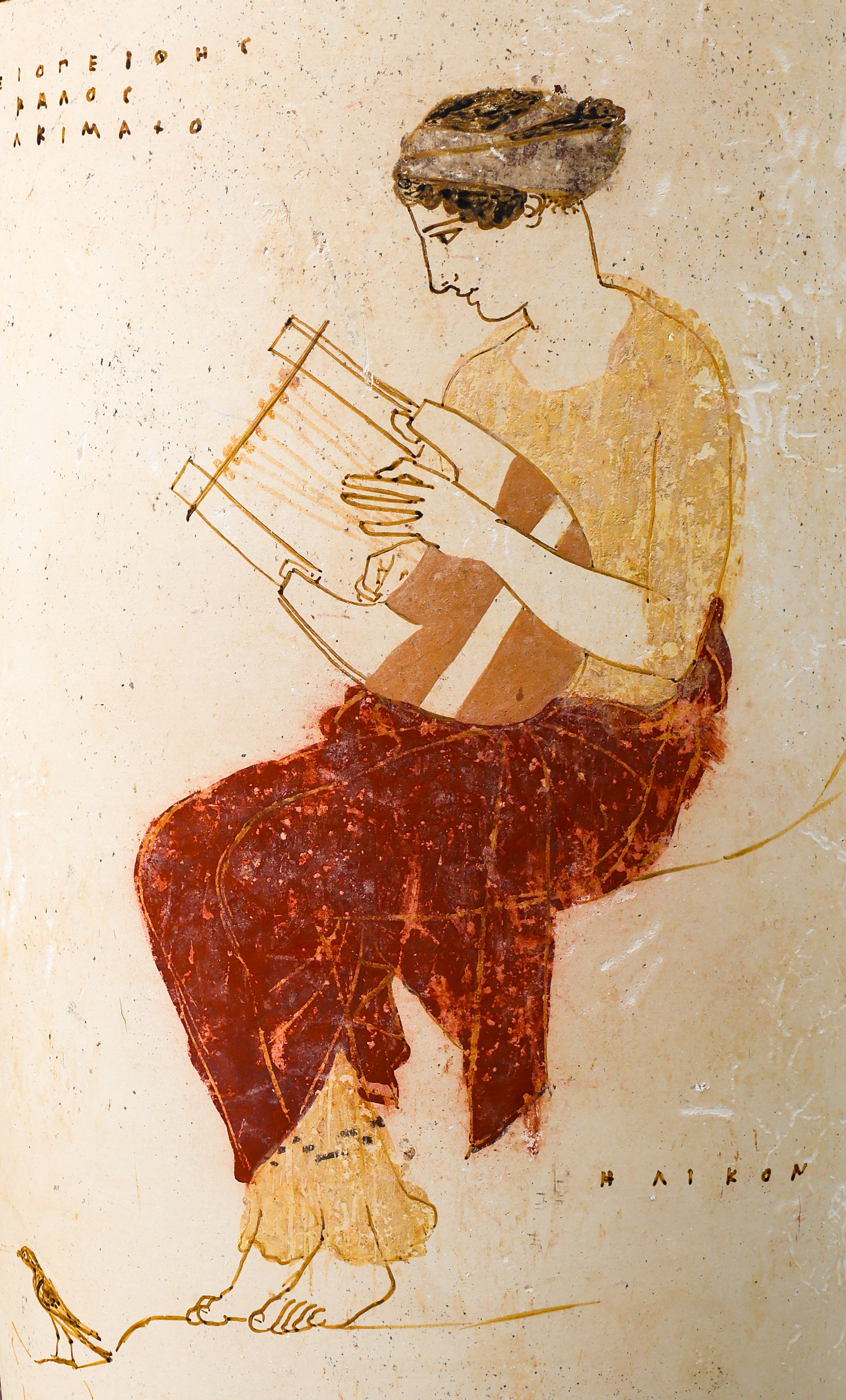
Kithara player 445–435 BCE from vase, painting by the Achilles Painter

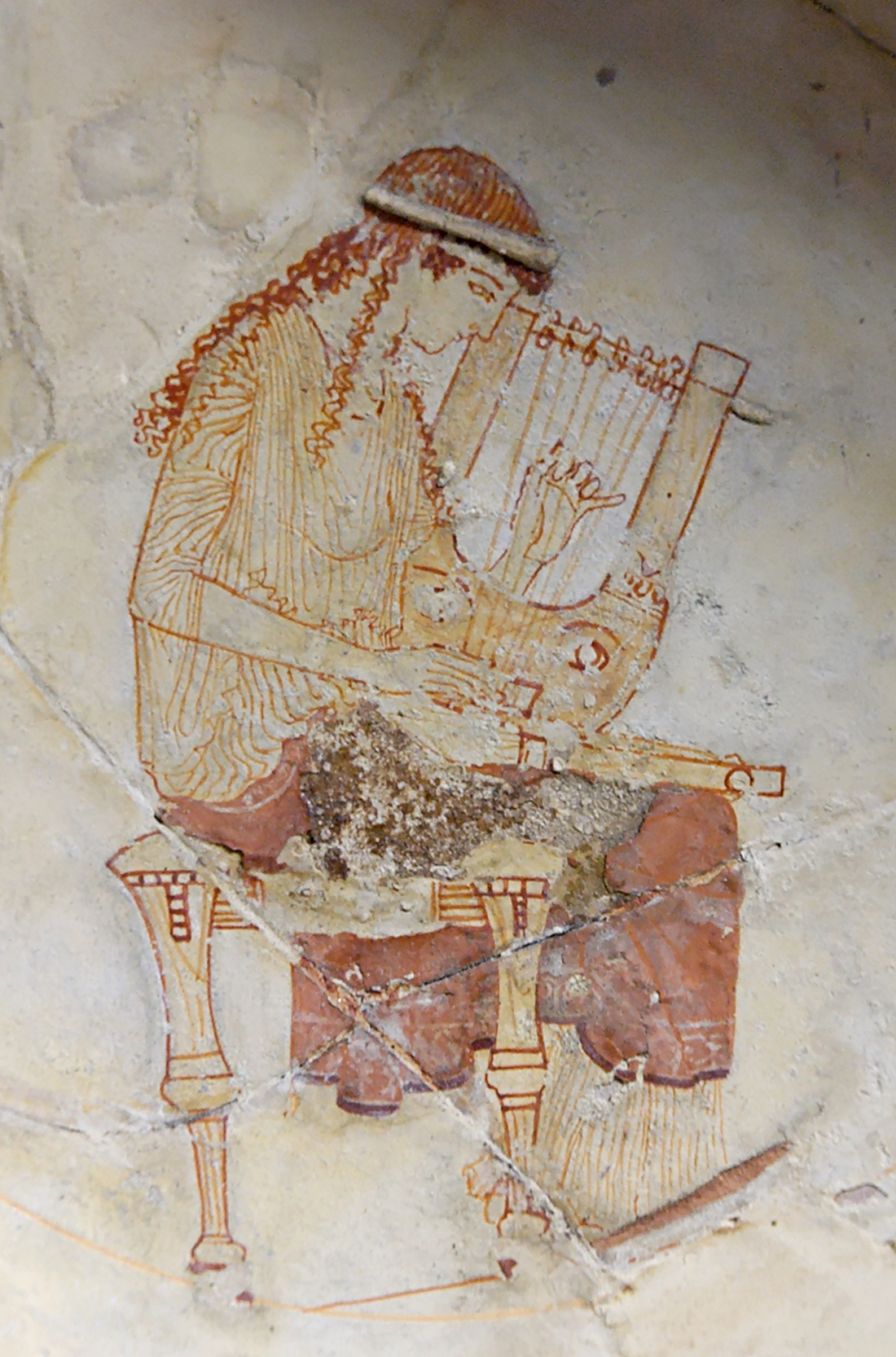
Muse tuning two phorminges. The phorminx was an intermediate stage, as the cithara developed from the lyre. Detail from an Attic white-ground cup from Eretria, c. 465 BCE.

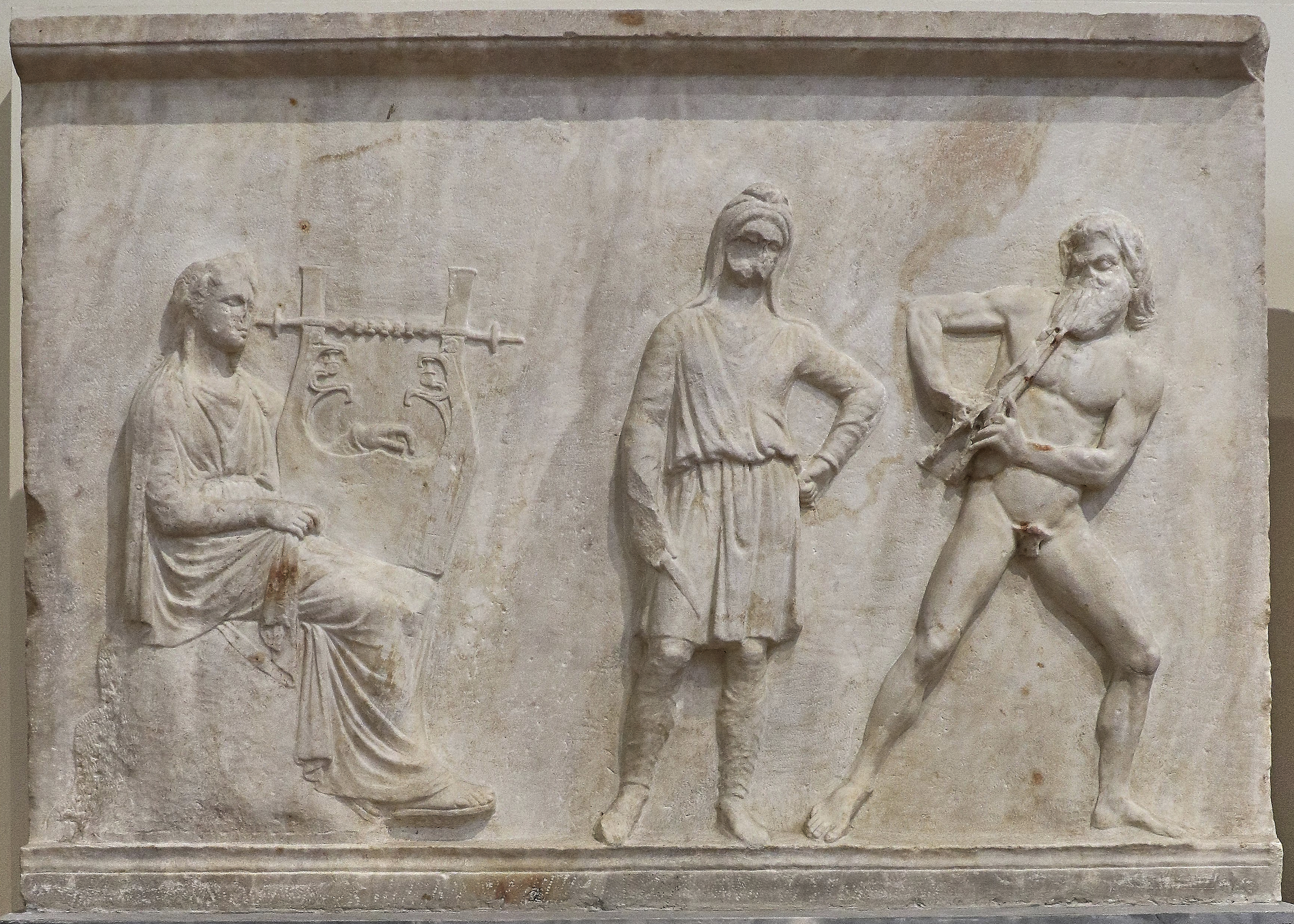
Apollo and Marsyas, 4th century BC

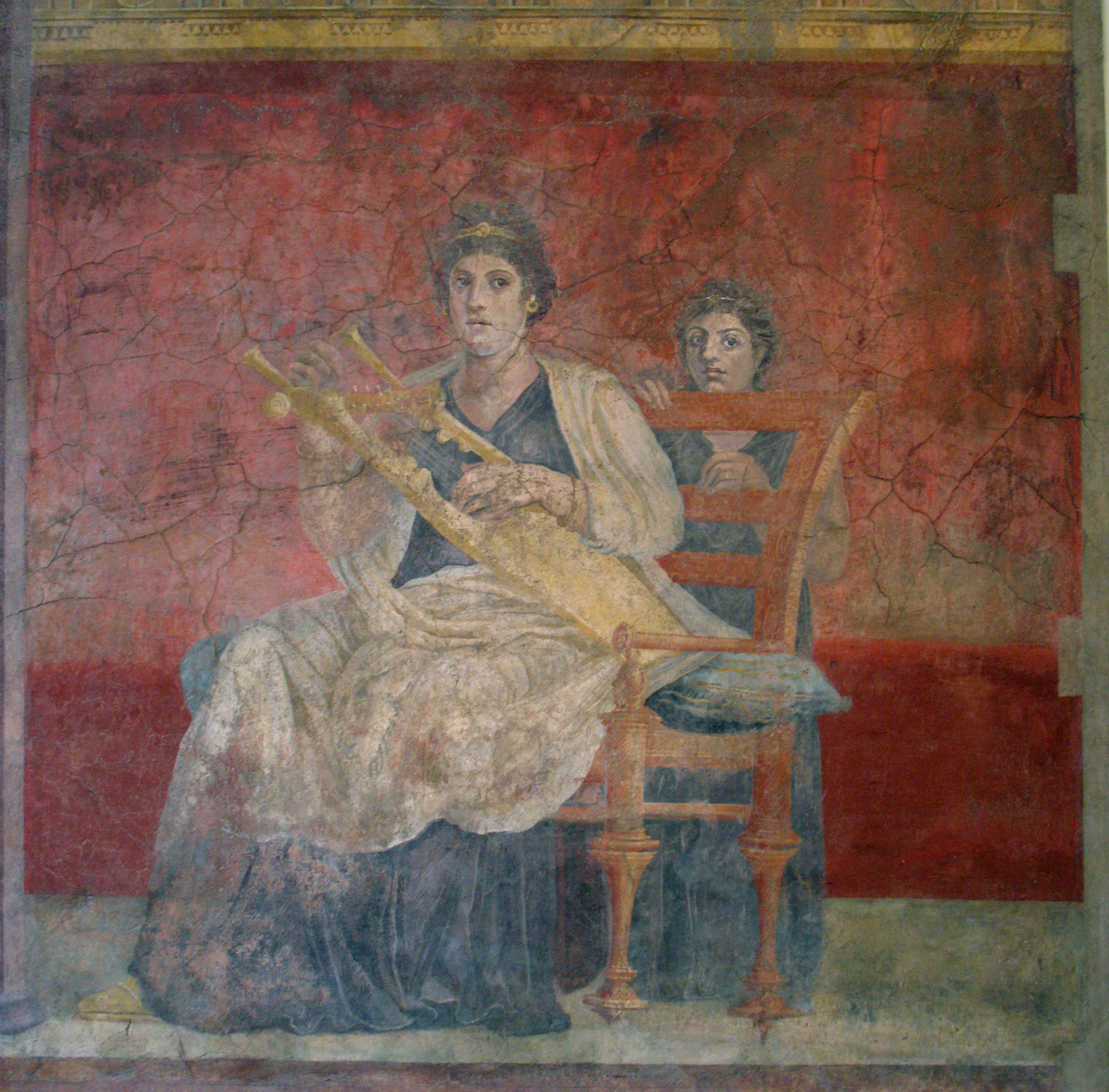
A Roman representation of a woman playing the cithara (Villa Boscoreale, c. 40–30 BC).

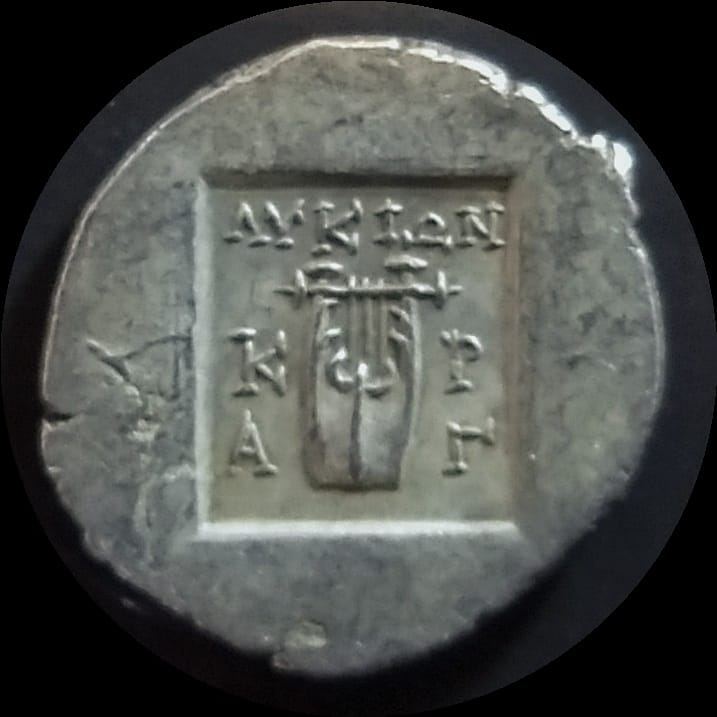
Cithara on the reverse of a hemidrachm from Cragus (Lycian League).

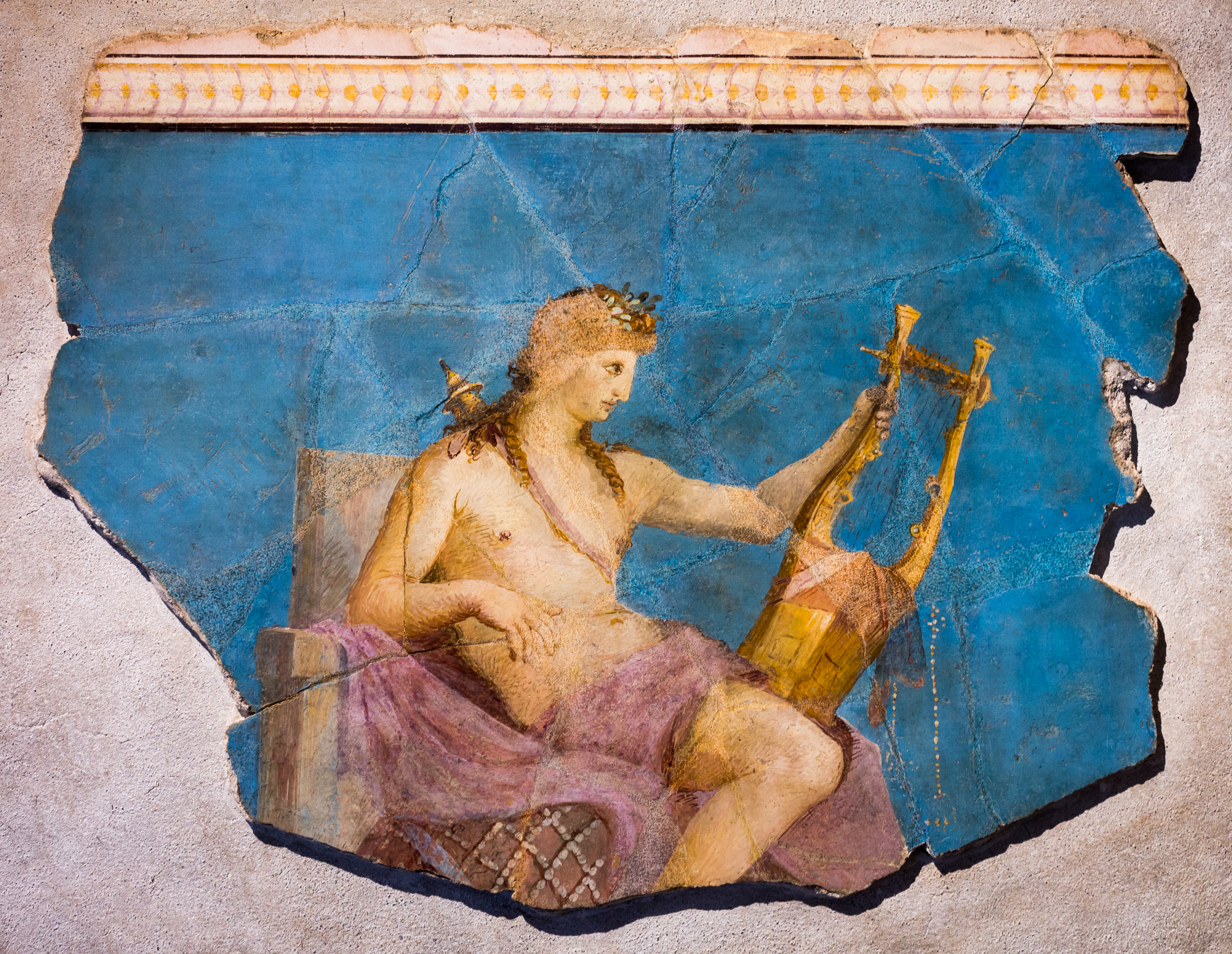
Apollo Kitharoidos. Painted plaster, Roman artwork from the Augustan period.

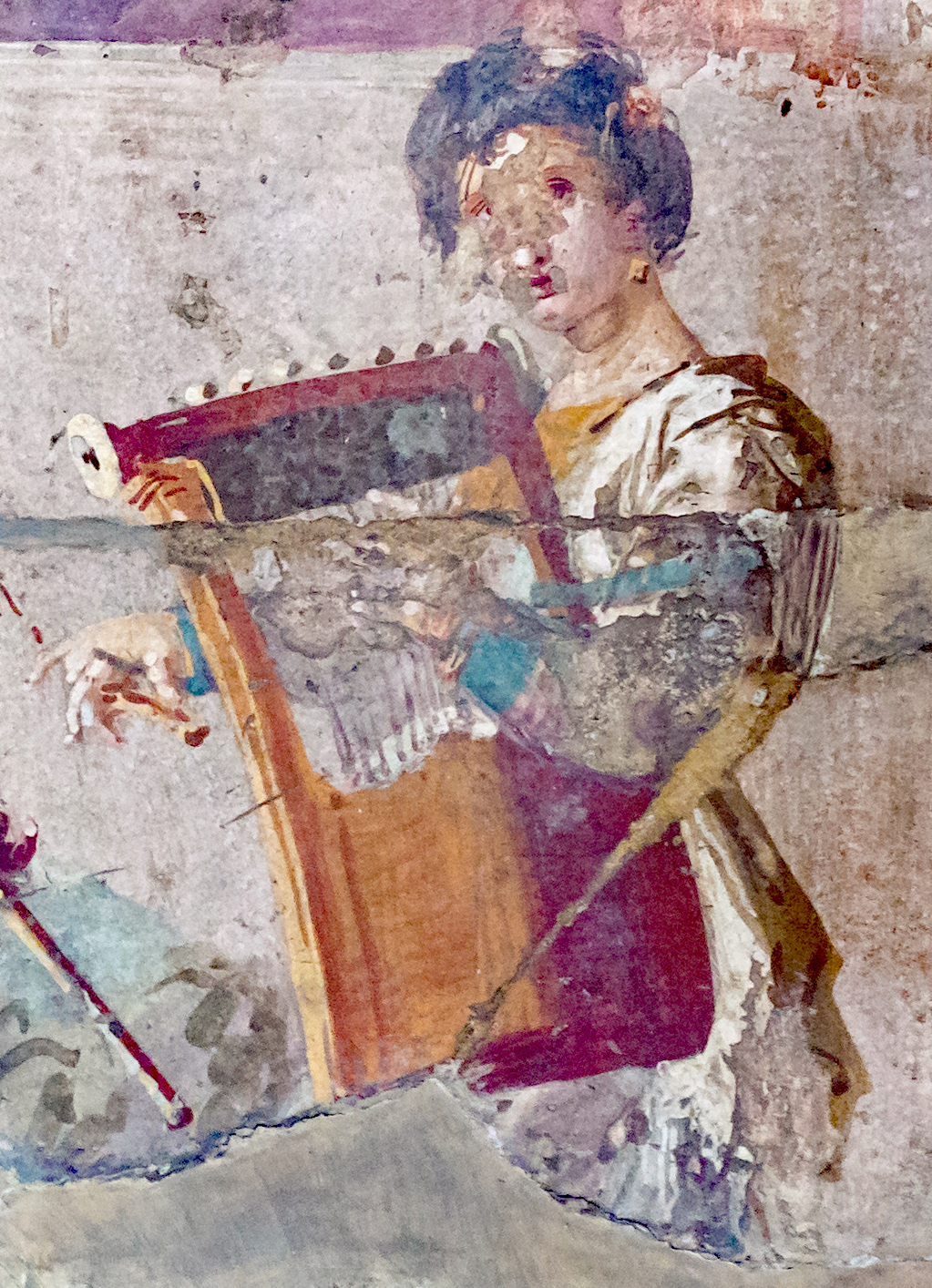
1st century CE, Herculaneum. Woman playing kithara; 2 straps are visible that holds the instrument up while she uses both hands to play (one blue, one yellow).

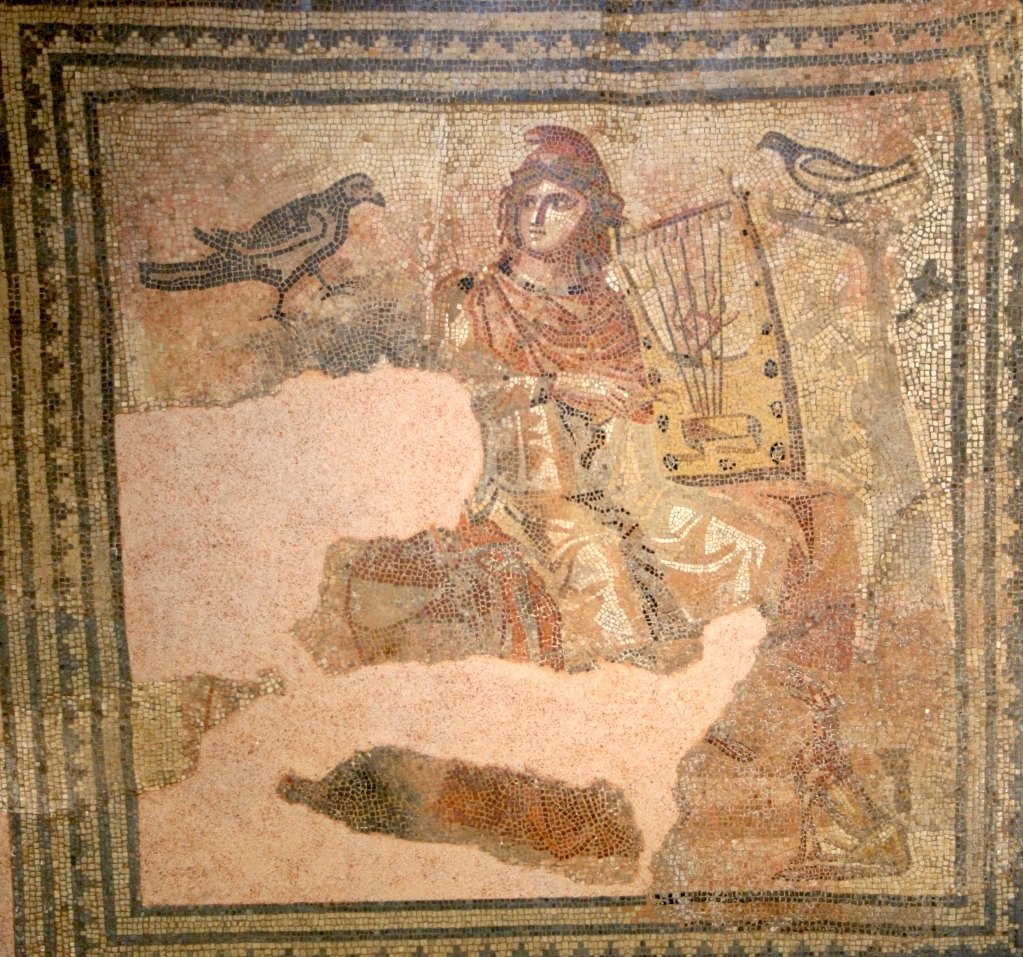
Orpheus Mosaic in Rottweil

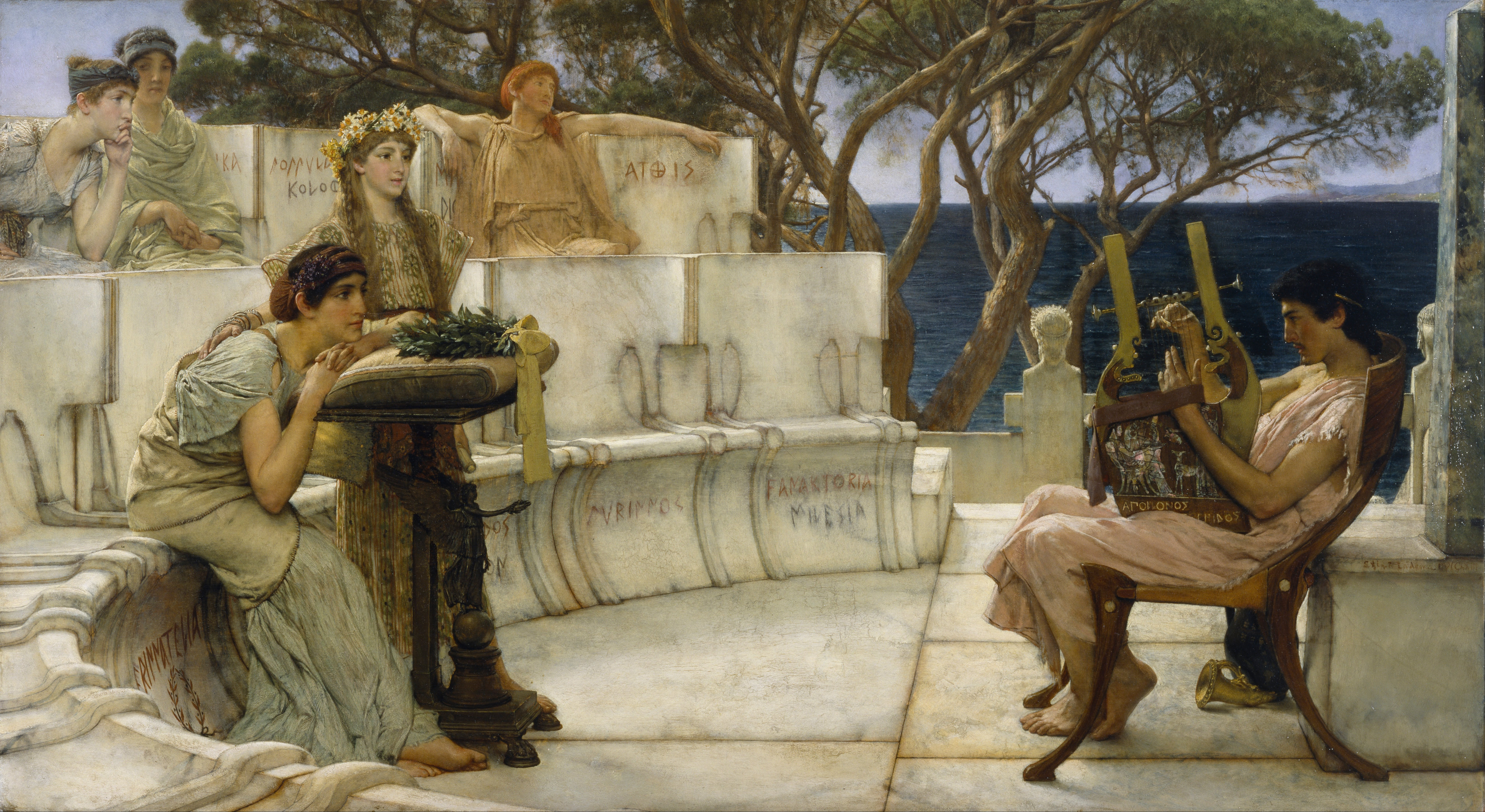
Alcaeus of Mytilene playing a cithara while Sappho listens in Sappho and Alcaeus by Lawrence Alma-Tadema (1881; The Walters Art Museum).

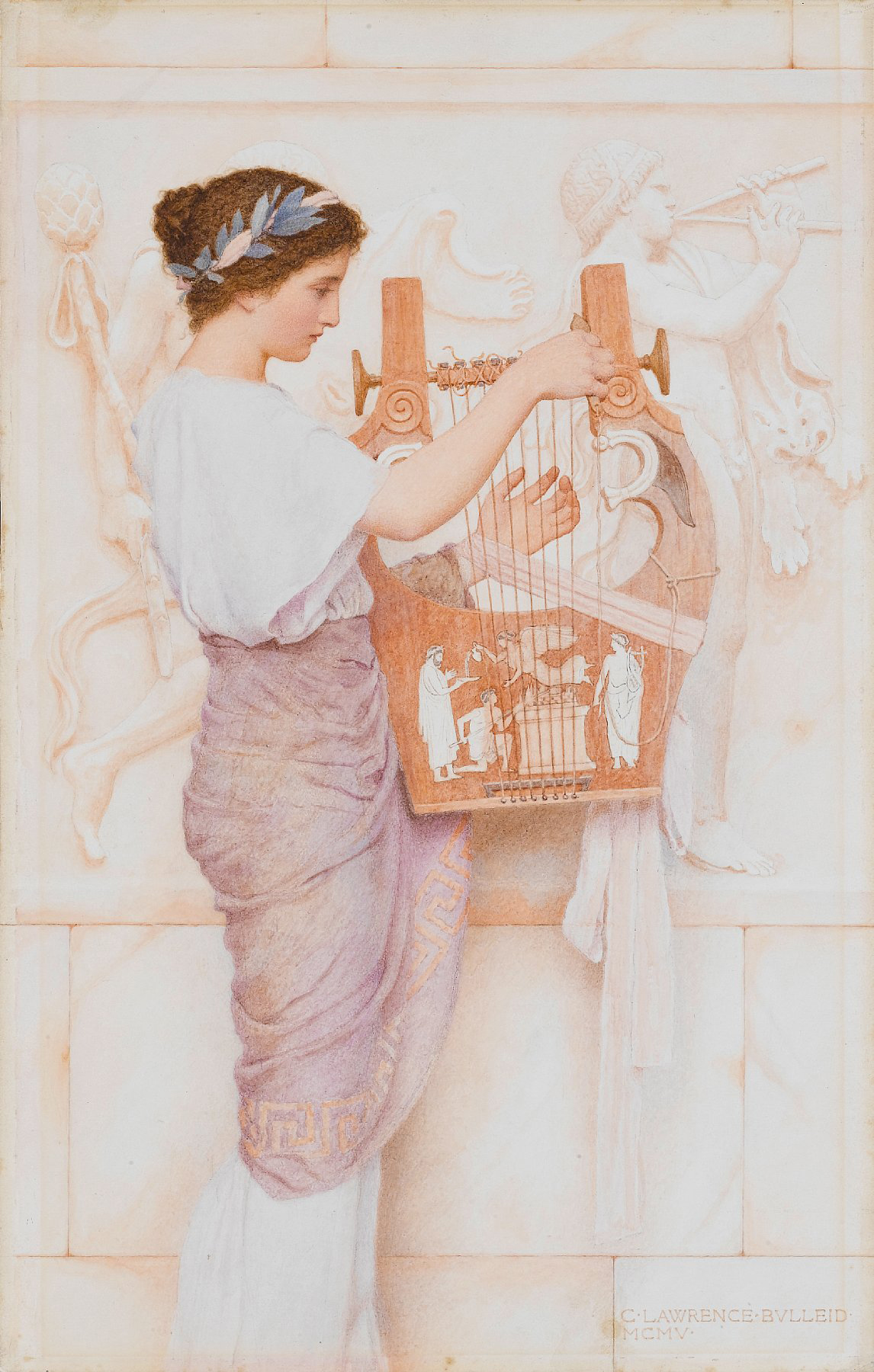
Girl with Lute by George Lawrence Bulleid, 1905

A reconstruction of the so-called Apollo's kithara in Kotsanas Museum of Ancient Greek Technology, Athens, Greece.

== See also ==
- Ancient Greece
- Ancient Greek music
- Ancient Rome
- Barbiton
- Cythara
- Gittern, an instrument whose name is derived from Kithara
- Guitar
- Harp
- Kinnor
- Kitharode
- Lyre
- Phorminx
- Pandura
- Rotte
- Sitar
- Zither

== Sources ==
- Anderson, Warren D. (1994). Music and Musicians in Ancient Greece. Ithaca, NY: Cornell University Press. ISBN 0-8014-3083-6.
- Ciabattoni, Francesco (2010). Dante's Journey to Polyphony. Toronto, Buffalo and London: University of Toronto Press. ISBN 9781442620230.
- Maas, Martha; Snyder, Jane McIntosh (1989). Stringed Instruments of Ancient Greece. New Haven, CT: Yale University Press. ISBN 978-030003686-2.
- Segerman, Ephraim (1999). "A Short History of the Cittern". The Galpin Society Journal. 52: 77–107. doi:10.2307/842519. JSTOR 842519.
- Vorreiter, Leopold (1975). "The Swan-Neck Lyres of Minoan-Mycenaean Culture". The Galpin Society Journal. 28: 93–97. doi:10.2307/841575. JSTOR 841575.
- West, Martin Litchfield (1992). Ancient Greek Music. Oxford: Oxford University Press. ISBN 0-19-814975-1.
