= Timotheus of Miletus =

Greek harpist and poet (c. 446 – 357 BC)

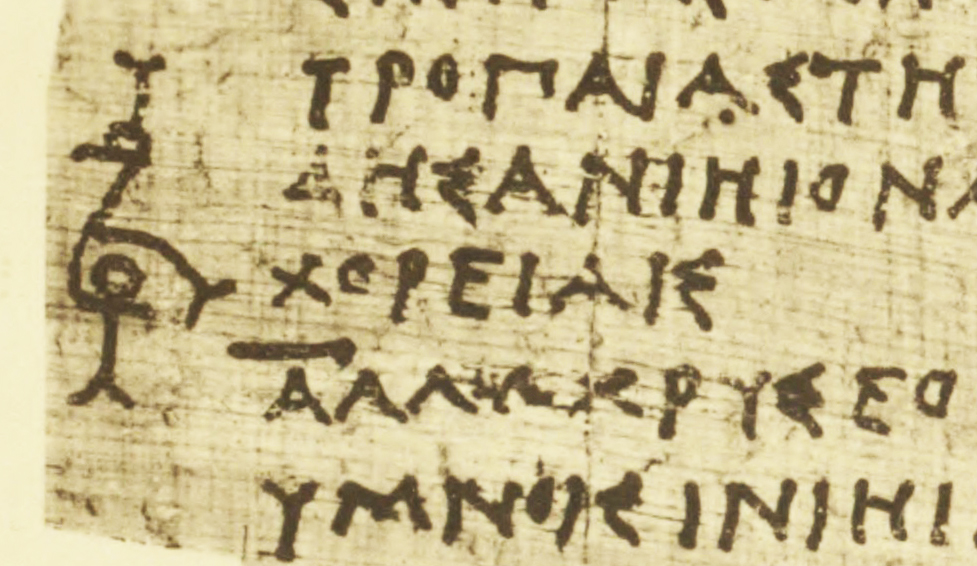
A depiction of coronis in the margin of Timotheus' Persians.

Timotheus of Miletus (Ancient Greek: Τιμόθεος ὁ Μιλήσιος; c. 446 – 357 BC) was a Greek musician and dithyrambic poet, an exponent of the "new music." He added one or more strings to the lyre, whereby he incurred the displeasure of the Spartans and Athenians (E. Curtius, Hist of Greece, bk. v. ch. 2). He composed musical works of a mythological and historical character.

He spent some years in the court of Archelaus I of Macedon.

Fragments of Timotheus' poetry survive, published in Denys Page, Poetae Melici Graeci. A papyrus fragment of his Persians (one of the oldest Greek papyri in existence), discovered at Abusir has been edited by U. von Wilamowitz-Mollendorff (1903), with discussion of the nome, meter, number of strings of the lyre, date of the poet and fragment.

== Conflation ==
In post-Classical literature Timotheus of Miletus is sometimes confused with another famous musician, the aulete Timotheus in the court of Alexander the Great.

Rabelais speaks of the musician in Chapter 23 of Gargantua "Ponocrates also made him forget everything he learned with his former preceptors, as Timotheus did with those of his disciples who were trained by other musicians." Rabelais implies that Timotheus believed other musicians to have merely inculcated bad habits.
