= Pythian 1 =

Ancient Greek poem by Pindar

- by Pindar
- Written: 470 BC
- Language: ancient Greek
- Genre: Victory Ode
- Meter: Dactylo-epitrite
- Lines: 100

Pindar's First Pythian Ode is an ancient Greek epinicion praising Hiero of Syracuse for a victory in the Pythian Games. It was to be sung at a grand musical festival, celebrating Hiero of Syracuse's achievements and the founding of the new city, Aetna. Most of Pindar's signature characteristics and signature style appear in this poem. Pindar utilizes religion, local mythology, and his poetic genius to create an ode that outlasts the occasion itself. The motif of the ode is harmony: harmony of the lyre and moral harmony of a life formed by justice, liberality, and the pleasure of the gods. The one follows the other and link together as one true source of imperishable honor of a man.

== Hiero of Syracuse ==
Hiero, tyrant of Syracuse, had been the recipient of Pindar's First Olympian Ode in 476 BC. His victory in the Pythian games comes in the wake of a number of significant military accomplishments: his defeat of the Carthaginians at the Battle of Himera and of the Etruscans in the naval Battle of Cumae. Both events are alluded to in the poem. Special attention, however, is afforded to Hiero's foundation of the city of Aetna. He had founded the settlement near Mount Etna for his son Deinomenes the Younger to rule and proclaimed himself one of its citizens upon winning the chariot race at Delphi.

== Typhon ==
Most of Pindar's victory odes contain a mythical narrative as part of their encomiastic strategy. Pythian 1 features the story of Typhon, a mythical giant who challenged Zeus' primacy and was consequently buried beneath Mount Etna. The poem envisions his imprisonment as the cause for a volcanic eruption of Etna, which it then goes on to describe. The eruption constitutes an elaborate ecphrasis and has been considered by critics to be central to the poem's interpretation.

== Structure ==
The structure of the poem features of an oratorio with rapid transitions from one tone energy to another. From vibrancy to tranquility, from joy to sadness, held together by harmonies of rhythm and language. The mood is Dorian and the rhythm is dactylo-epitrite. Of the five triads, first two deal with harmony; the third and fourth consists of Hiero's work as a founder and warrior, and the last triad is praise disguised under sage counsel. Overall structure follow:

Str.1 - Ant.1 - Ep.1; Str.2 - Ant.2 - Ep.2; Str.3 - Ant.3 - Ep.3; Str.4 - Ant.4 - Ep.4; Str.5 - Ant.5 - Ep.5

Musical phrases within the larger rhythmic period of the strophe and anti-strophe are uniformly balanced off against one another in points of constituent metrical feed, in the pattern:

I 2.5; 4; 5.2; II 4.2; 3.4; 4.2; III 5.3.5

But in the epodes the pattern is:

I 5.2.5.3; II 4.4; III 3.2; 2.3.2; 2.3; IV 4.4; 3; 4.4

== English translations ==
- Pythian 1, translated into English verse by Gilbert West (1749)
- Pythian 1, translated into English verse by C. A. Wheelwright (1846)
- Pythian 1, translated into English prose by Ernest Myers (1874)

== Bibliography ==
- Fearn, D. (2017) Pindar's Eyes (Oxford)
- Fries, Almut (2023). Pindar's First Pythian ode: text, introduction and commentary. Berlin/Boston (Mass.): Walter de Gruyter. ISBN 9783111126005.
- Nisetich, F. (1980) Pindar's Victory Songs (Baltimore)
- Race, W. (1997) Pindar: Olympian Odes. Pythian Odes (Cambridge, MA)
