= Pherenikos =

Ancient Greek racehorse

Pherenikos (Greek: Φερένικος; Latin: Pherenicus) was an Ancient Greek chestnut racehorse victorious at the Olympic and Pythian Games in the 470s BC. Pherenikos, whose name means "victory-bearer", was "the most famous racehorse in antiquity". Owned by Hieron I, tyrant of Syracuse, Pherenikos is celebrated in the victory odes of both Pindar and Bacchylides.

== Career ==
In Pythian Ode III, Pindar recalls "the crowns of the Pythian Games" which Pherenikos had won previously; according to the scholiasts or ancient commentators, Hieron was victorious in the single horse race at Delphi during the twenty-sixth and twenty-seventh iterations of the games, in 482 and 478 BC; alternatively "crowns" may simply function as a poetic plural. In 476 BC, Hieron was victorious in the single horse race at Olympia; this victory is celebrated by Pindar in Olympian I and Bacchylides in Ode 5, with Pherenikos named and prominent in both; the date is confirmed by the list of Olympian victors in Papyrus Oxyrhynchus 222, which includes a further Olympic victory for Hieron in 472, also mentioned in the scholia. Whether Pherenikos was the winning horse also on this last occasion is unknown; if first victorious in 482, it would suggest a long career, but the shape of the course may have called for horses with experience as well as speed.

== Celebration ==
In Olympian I, the graceful Pherenikos speeds to victory beside the Alpheus, "ungoaded in the race"; giving his body freely, he elevates his master, and plants sweet thoughts in people's minds (lines 18–22). In Ode 5, the "golden-maned" Pherenikos is "storm-swift" (a hapax), racing like the North Wind, and his jockey by metaphor a "helmsman"; the poet swears, touching the earth, that "never yet in a race has dust raised by horses in front sullied him"; and the speeding horse brings victory to "hospitable" Hieron (lines 37–49; also 176–86). A fragment of an encomium by Bacchylides preserved in another of the Oxyrhynchus Papyri (1361) praises Pherenikos once more: victorious with his "swift hooves" at Delphi and Olympia, he brought grace to his master. According to Maurice Bowra, since both poets speak of the same horse, this enables comparison of their respective approaches to the epinikion or victory ode: Bacchylides "enters thoroughly into the excitement of the race", while Pindar's concern, more than "beauty as revealed in action", is moral character and kleos.

== See also ==
- Jockey of Artemision
- Panhellenic Games
- Hippodrome
