= Olympian 1 =

Pindar's 1st Olympic Ode

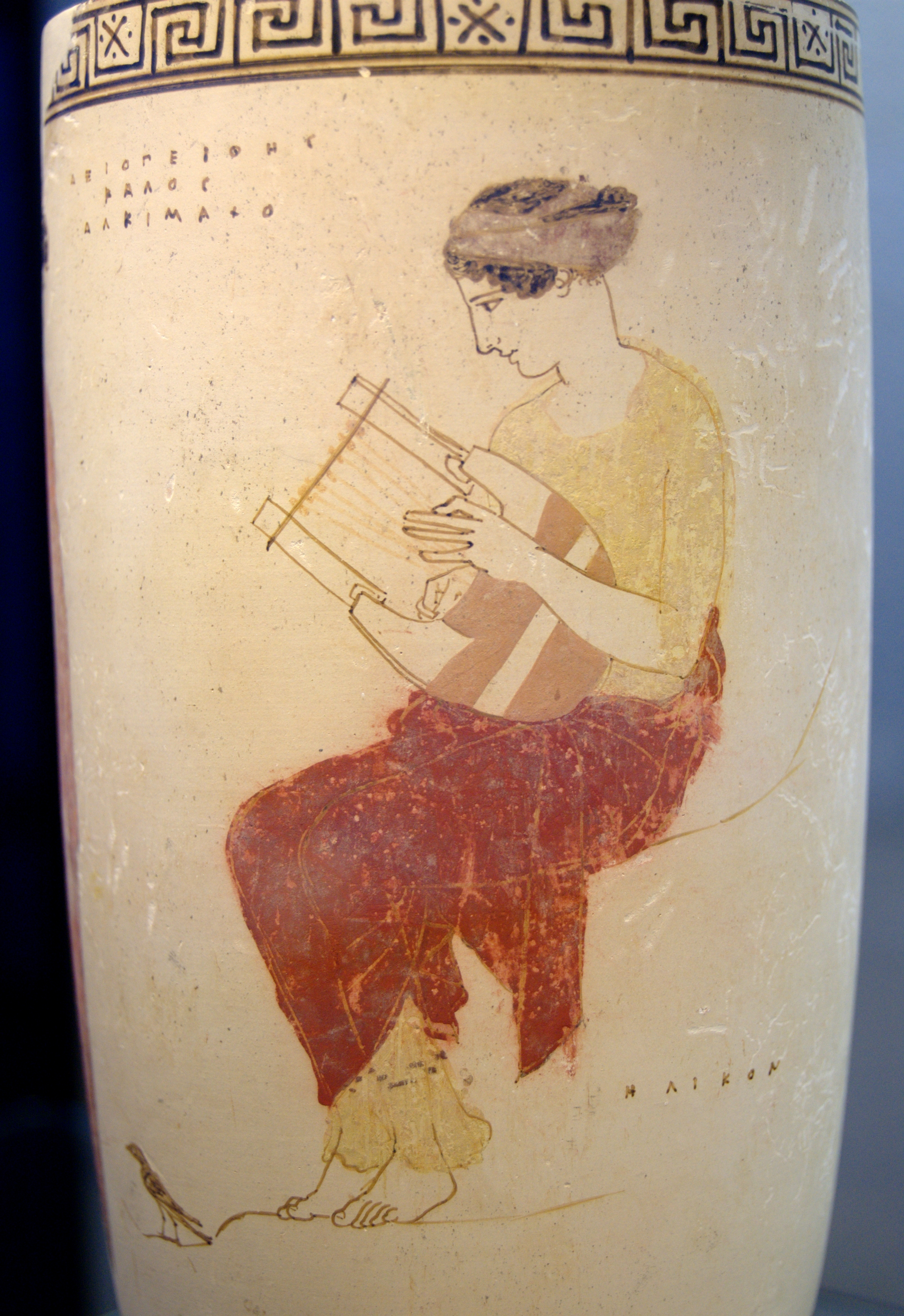
Pindar composed his victory ode for performance, in the Aeolian mode (line 102) and to the accompaniment of the phorminx: "Come, take the Dorian lyre down from its peg" (lines 17-18). On this white-ground lekythos by the Achilles Painter, c. 450 BC, a female figure is seated on a rock labelled Helicon, the mountain sacred to the Muses, thus identifying her as one of the nine. She plays the phorminx while the small bird by her feet may represent accompanying song

The Greek lyric poet Pindar composed odes to celebrate victories at all four Panhellenic Games. Of his fourteen Olympian Odes, glorifying victors at the Ancient Olympic Games, the First was positioned at the beginning of the collection by Aristophanes of Byzantium since it included praise for the games as well as of Pelops, who first competed at Elis (the polis or city-state in which the festival was later staged). It was the most quoted in antiquity and was hailed as the "best of all the odes" by Lucian. Pindar composed the epinikion in honour of his then patron Hieron I, tyrant of Syracuse, whose horse Pherenikos and its jockey were victorious in the single horse race in 476 BC.

== Poetry ==
The ode begins with a priamel, where the rival distinctions of water and gold are introduced as a foil to the true prize, the celebration of victory in song. Ring-composed, Pindar returns in the final lines to the mutual dependency of victory and poetry, where "song needs deeds to celebrate, and success needs songs to make the areta last". Through his association with victors, the poet hopes to be "famed in sophia among Greeks everywhere" (lines 115-6). Yet a fragment of Eupolis suggests Pindar's hopes were frustrated, his compositions soon "condemned to silence by the boorishness of the masses".

== Pelops ==
At the heart of the ode is Pindar's "refashioning" of the myth of Pelops, king of Pisa, son of Tantalus, father of Thyestes and Atreus, and hero after whom the Peloponnese or "Isle of Pelops" is named. Pindar rejects the common version of the myth, wherein Tantalus violates the reciprocity of the feast and serves up his dismembered son Pelops to the gods (lines 48-52); Pelops' shoulder is of gleaming ivory (line 35) since Demeter, in mourning for Kore, unsuspectingly ate that part. Instead Pindar has Pelops disappear because he is carried off by Poseidon. After his "erotic complaisance", Pelops appeals to Poseidon for help, "if the loving gifts of Cyprian Aphrodite result in any gratitude" (lines 75-76); the god grants him a golden chariot and horses with untiring wings (line 87); with these Pelops defeats Oenomaus in a race and wins the hand of his daughter Hippodameia, avoiding the fate of death previously meted out upon a series of vanquished suitors.

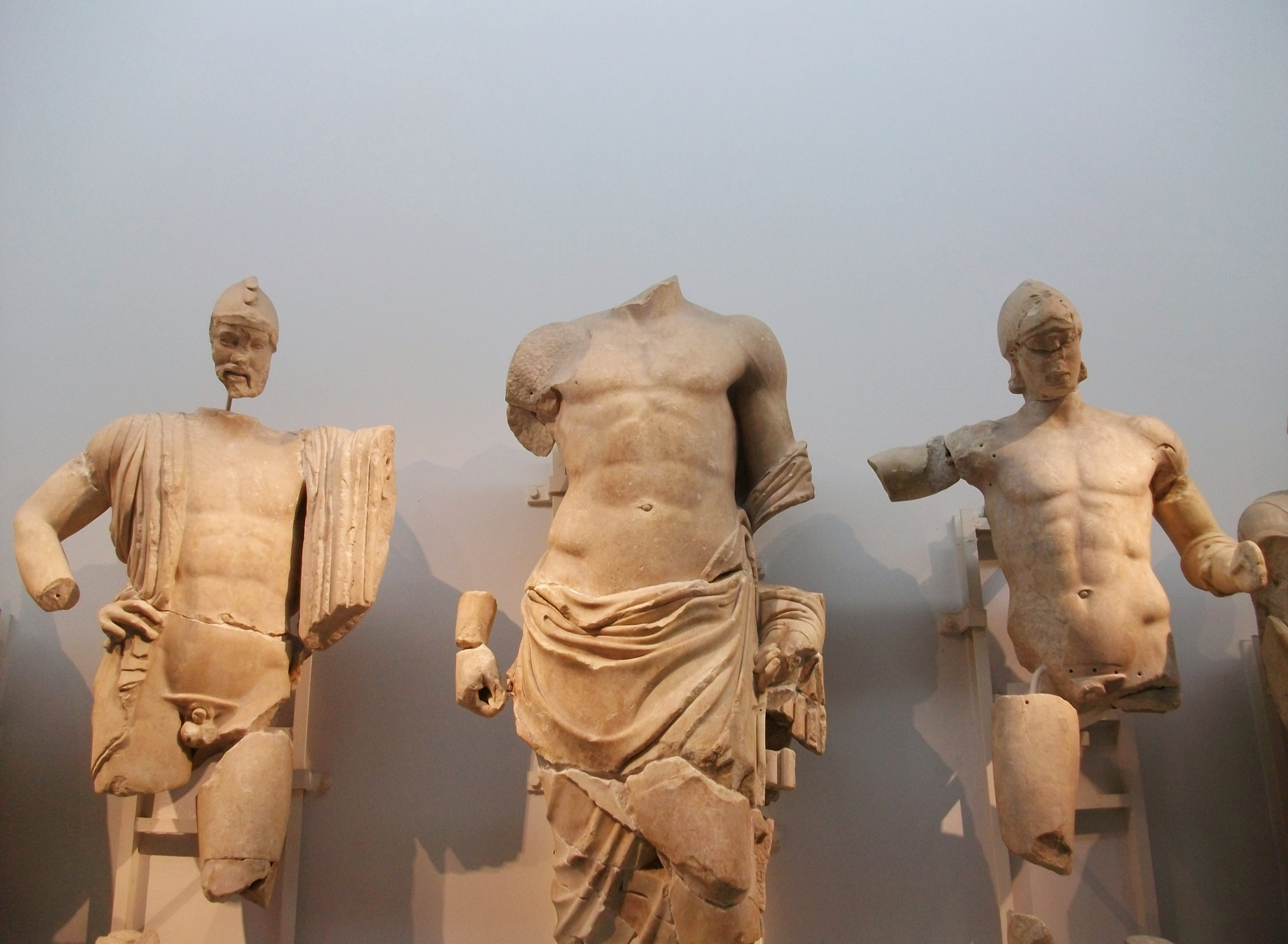
Zeus flanked by Oenomaus and Pelops from the centre of the east pediment of the Temple of Zeus at Olympia, carved from Parian marble between 470 and 457 BC; the sculptural programme is described at length by Pausanias (V.10) ; the defeat of Oenomaus by Pelops provided a "legendary parallel" for the ousting from control of the festival of the Pisatans by the Eleans

In Homo Necans, Walter Burkert reads in these myths a reflection of the sacrificial rites at Olympia. The cultic centres of the sanctuary were the altar of Zeus, the stadium, and the tomb of Pelops, where "now he has a share in splendid blood-sacrifices, resting beside the ford of the Alpheus" (lines 90-93). According to Philostratus, after sacrifice and the laying of the consecrated parts upon the altar, the runners would stand one stadion distant from it; once the priest had given the signal with a torch, they would race, with the winner then setting light to the offerings. Pindar, subordinating the foot race to that of the four-horse chariot, "could reflect the actual aetiology of the Olympics in the early 5th century [BC]".

== Patronage ==
According to Maurice Bowra, the main purpose of the poem is "Pindar's first attempt to deal seriously with the problems of kingship", and especially "the relations of kings with the gods". Hieron, "Pindar's greatest patron" and honorand in four odes and a now-fragmentary encomium, is likened to a Homeric king, as he "sways the sceptre of the law in sheep-rich Sicily" (lines 12-13). Pindar incorporates the ideology of xenia or hospitality into his ode, setting it in the context of a choral performance around Hieron's table, to the strains of the phorminx (lines 15-18). Yet the poet keeps his distance; the central mythological episode is concerned with chariot racing, a more prestigious competition than the single horse race; and Pindar warns Hieron that there are limits to human ambition (line 114).

== English translations ==
- Olympian 1, translated into English verse by Ambrose Philips (1748)
- Olympian 1, translated into English verse by C. A. Wheelwright (1846)
- Olympian 1, translated into English prose by Ernest Myers (1874)

== See also ==
- Ode 5 by Bacchylides (celebrating the same victory)
- Curse of the Atreids
- Greek hero cult
- Nine lyric poets
- Kleos
- Papyrus Oxyrhynchus 222
