= Pindar's Eighth Nemean Ode =

Ancient Greek poem

Nemean 8
- by Pindar
- Written: 459 BC (?)
- Language: ancient Greek
- Genre: Victory Ode
- Meter: Dactylo-epitrite
- Lines: 51

Pindar's Eighth Nemean Ode is an ancient Greek epinikion celebrating a victory of Deinias of Aegina. The poem's exact occasion is uncertain, but a success in the diaulos race at the Nemean games is presumed to be the athletic contest in question. While its presumptive date of composition is 459 BC, the poem is known for its treatment of the Aeacidae and the suicide of Ajax.

== Recipient ==
The ode is addressed to Deinias of Aegina and his father Megas, who had won a similar victory and is mentioned as having recently died. Both are little known figures whose victories in the Nemean games are only recorded by Pindar's poem.

== Myth ==
As is common in Pindaric victory odes, Nemean 8 features a mythical narrative. In honour of the legendary king of Aegina, Aeacus, the poem is concerned with his son Ajax and his failed attempt to win the arms of the deceased Achilles. In line with other treatments of the myth (for example, in Sophocles' Ajax), the arms are instead given to Odysseus, which causes Ajax to take his own life by plunging into a sword.

== Works cited ==
- Fearn, D. (2017) Pindar's Eyes: Visual and Material Culture in Epinician Poetry (Oxford)
- Nisetich, F. (1980) Pindar's Victory Songs (Baltimore)
- Race, W. (1997) Pindar: Nemean Odes. Isthmian Odes. Fragments (Cambridge, MA)
