= Battle of Cumae (474 BC) =

Battle between Cumae and the Etruscans

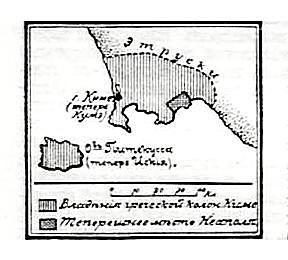
- Map illustrating the battle (in Russian)
Date	474 BC
Location	In the Bay of Naples
Result	Greek victory
Territorial changes	Loss of Etruscan territory in Italy to the Romans, Samnites, and Gauls

Belligerents
Syracuse, Sicily; Cumae	Etruscans

Commanders and leaders
Hiero I of Syracuse	Etruscan kings

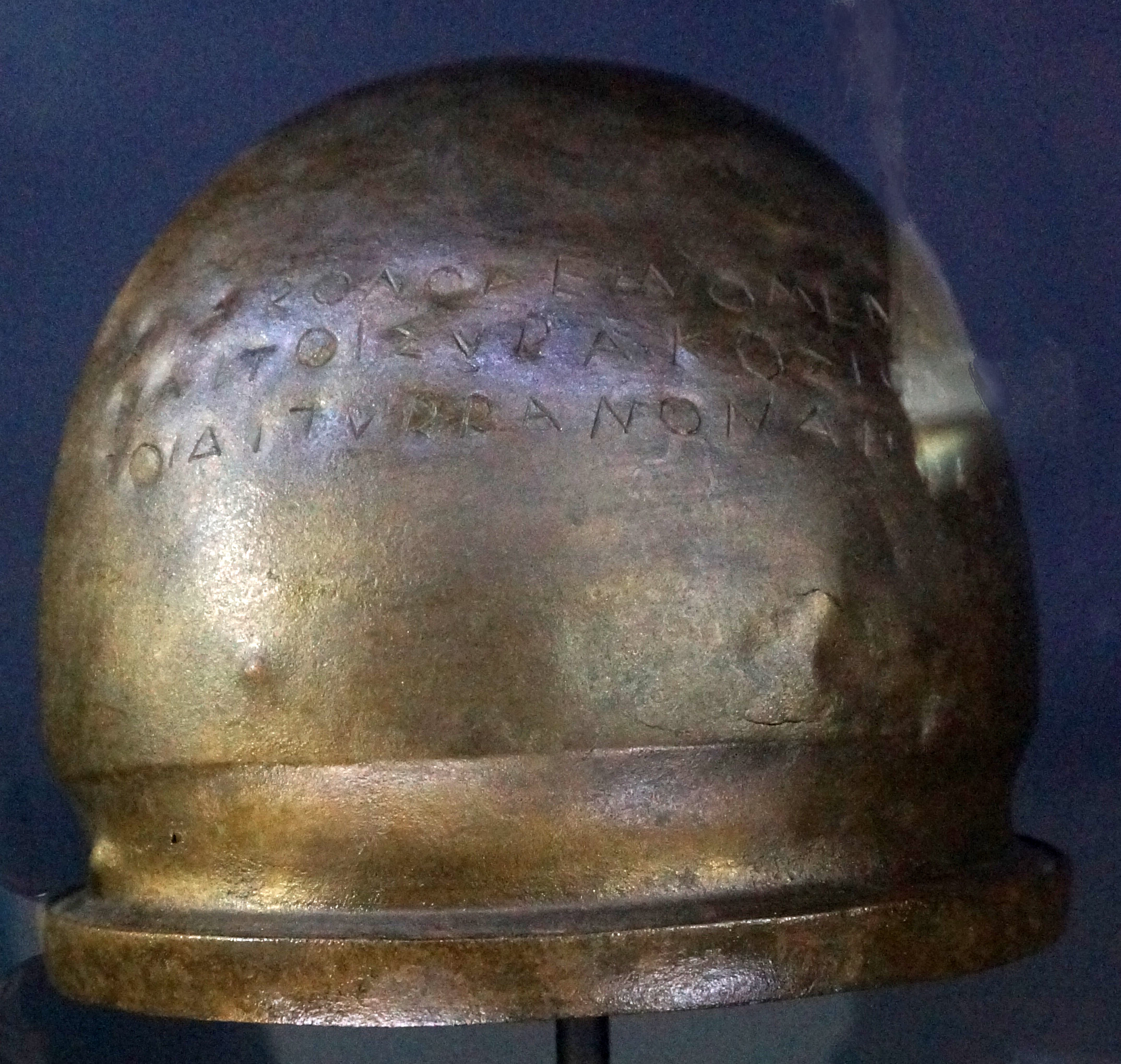
Helmet commemorating the Battle of Cumae now in the British Museum's collection

The Battle of Cumae was a naval battle fought by the combined navies of Syracuse and Cumae against the Etruscans in 474 BC.

The city of Cumae in southern Italy was founded by Greek settlers in the 8th century BC in an area near the southern frontier of Etruscan control. By 504 BC, the southern Etruscans had been defeated by the Cumaeans, but they still maintained a powerful force. In 474 BC, they were able to raise a fleet to launch a direct attack on Cumae.

The Cumaeans called on the tyrant Hiero I of Syracuse for military assistance. He allied with naval forces from the Greek cities of southern Italy to defend against Etruscan expansion towards the south. They met and defeated the Etruscan fleet at Cumae in the Bay of Naples.

After their defeat, the Etruscans lost much of their political influence in Italy. They later joined the failed Athenian expedition against Syracuse (415 BC), which contributed even further to their decline. They lost their naval supremacy, and their territories were gradually taken over by the Romans, Samnites and Gauls.

The Syracusans dedicated a captured Etruscan helmet at the great Panhellenic sanctuary at Olympia, which was later found in the German excavations there. The battle was honored in Pindar's first Pythian Ode.
