= Pindar =

5th-century BC Greek lyric poet

- Πίνδαρος
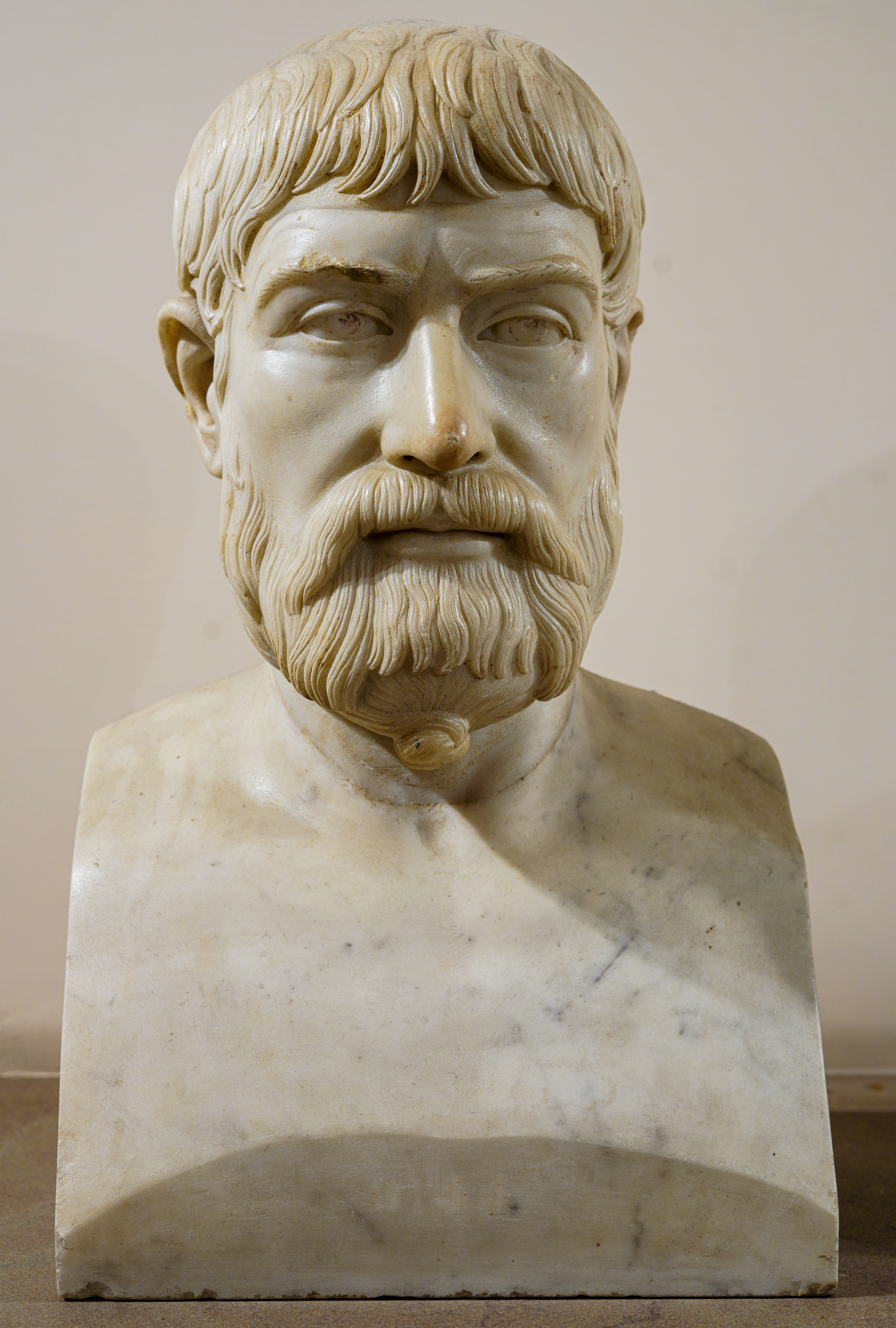
- Pindar, Roman copy of Greek 5th century BC bust (Museo Archeologico Nazionale, Naples)
- Born: c. 518 BC; Cynoscephalae, Boiotia
- Died: c. 438 BC (aged approximately 80); Argos
- Occupation: Lyric poet
- Writing career
- Genre: Poetry

Pindar (/ˈpɪndər/; Ancient Greek: Πίνδαρος Pindaros [píndaros]; Latin: Pindarus; c. 518 BC – c. 438 BC) was an Ancient Greek lyric poet from Thebes. Of the canonical nine lyric poets of ancient Greece, his work is the best preserved. Quintilian wrote, "Of the nine lyric poets, Pindar is by far the greatest, in virtue of his inspired magnificence, the beauty of his thoughts and figures, the rich exuberance of his language and matter, and his rolling flood of eloquence, characteristics which, as Horace rightly held, make him inimitable." His poems can also, however, seem difficult and even peculiar. The Athenian comic playwright Eupolis once remarked that they "are already reduced to silence by the disinclination of the multitude for elegant learning".

Pindar was the first Greek poet to reflect on the nature of poetry and on the poet's role. His poetry illustrates the beliefs and values of Archaic Greece at the dawn of the Classical period.

== Biography ==
=== Sources ===
Five ancient sources contain all the recorded details of Pindar's life. One of them is a short biography discovered in 1961 on an Egyptian papyrus dating from at least 200 AD (P.Oxy.2438). The other four are collections that were not finalized until some 1600 years after his death:

- A brief biography of Pindar and his tomb in Boeotia, from Pausanias's "descriptions of Greece" [9.23.2]-[9.23.5].
- Commentaries on Pindar by Eustathius of Thessalonica;
- Vita Vratislavensis, found in a manuscript at Wrocław, author unknown;
- a text by Thomas Magister;
- some meagre writings attributed to the lexicographer Suidas.

Although these sources are based on a much older literary tradition, going as far back as Chamaeleon of Heraclea in the 4th century BC, they are generally viewed with scepticism today: much of the material is clearly fanciful. Scholars both ancient and modern have turned to Pindar's own work – his victory odes in particular – as a source of biographical information: some of the poems touch on historic events and can be accurately dated. The 1962 publication of Elroy Bundy's ground-breaking work Studia Pindarica led to a change in scholarly opinion: the Odes were no longer seen as expressions of Pindar's personal thoughts and feelings, but rather as public statements "dedicated to the single purpose of eulogizing men and communities." It has been claimed that biographical interpretations of the poems are due to a "fatal conjunction" of historicism and Romanticism. In other words, we know almost nothing about Pindar's life based on either traditional sources or his own poems. However, the pendulum of intellectual fashion has begun to change direction again, and cautious use of the poems for some biographical purposes is considered acceptable once more.

πολλὰ γὰρ πολλᾷ λέλεκται: νεαρὰ δ᾽ ἐξευ-
ρόντα δόμεν βασάνῳ
ἐς ἔλεγχον, ἅπας κίνδυνος.

Story is vast in range: new ways to find
and test upon the touchstone,
Here danger lies. (Note: Pindar (1972) p. 212. The three lines here, and in Bowra's Greek, are actually two lines or stichoi in Greek prosody. Stichoi however are often too long to be preserved as single lines in published form, and they are then broken into metrical units, or cola, the break indicated by indentation. This practice is observed both in Greek and in translations, but it is a modern convenience or preference and it has no historical authority: "...nullam habet apud codices auctoritatem neque veri simile est Pindarum ita carmina manu propria conscripsisse.")

=== Life ===
==== Infancy to adulthood ====
Pindar was born circa 518 BC (the 65th Olympiad) in Cynoscephalae, a village in Boeotia, not far from Thebes. His father's name is variously given as Daiphantus, Pagondas or Scopelinus, and his mother's name was Cleodice. It is told that in his youth, or possibly infancy, bees built a honeycomb in his mouth and this was the reason he became a poet of honey-like verses. (An identical fate has been ascribed to other poets of the archaic period.) Pindar was about twenty years old in 498 BC when he was commissioned by the ruling family in Thessaly to compose his first victory ode (Pythian 10). He studied the art of lyric poetry in Athens, where his tutor was Lasos of Hermione, and he is also said to have received some helpful criticism from Corinna.

The early to middle years of Pindar's career coincided with the Greco-Persian Wars during the reigns of Darius and Xerxes. This period included the first Persian invasion of Greece, which ended at the Battle of Marathon in 490 BC, and the second Persian invasion of Greece (480–479 BC). During the second invasion, when Pindar was almost forty years old, Thebes was occupied by Xerxes' general, Mardonius, who with many Theban aristocrats subsequently perished at the Battle of Plataea. It is possible that Pindar spent much of this time at Aegina. His choice of residence during the earlier invasion in 490 BC is not known, but he was able to attend the Pythian Games of that year, where he first met the Sicilian prince, Thrasybulus, nephew of Theron of Acragas. Thrasybulus had driven the winning chariot; and he and Pindar were to form a lasting friendship, paving the way for his subsequent visit to Sicily.

==== Middle age ====
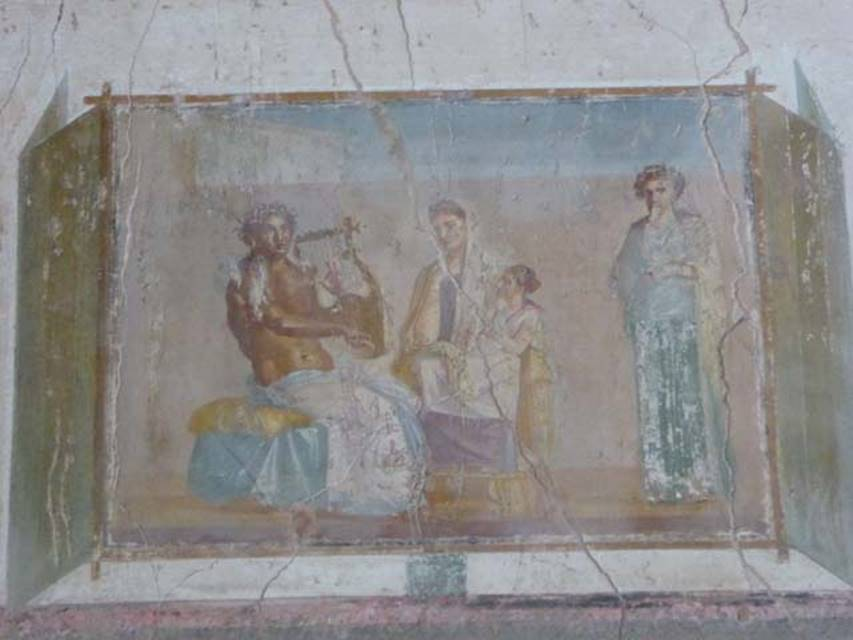
Enthroned Pindar with lyre, Muse and poetess. Antique fresco in Pompeii

Pindar seems to have used his odes to advance his, and his friends', personal interests. In 462 BC he composed two odes in honour of Arcesilas, king of Cyrene, (Pythians 4 and 5), pleading for the return from exile of a friend, Demophilus. In the latter ode Pindar proudly mentions his own ancestry, which he shared with the king, as an Aegeid or descendant of Aegeus, the legendary king of Athens. The clan was influential in many parts of the Greek world, having intermarried with ruling families in Thebes, in Lacedaemonia, and in cities that claimed Lacedaemonian descent, such as Cyrene and Thera. The historian Herodotus considered the clan important enough to deserve mention (Histories IV.147). Membership of this clan possibly contributed to Pindar's success as a poet, and it informed his political views, which are marked by a conservative preference for oligarchic governments of the Doric kind.

Pindar might not actually claim to be an Aegeid since his 'I' statements do not necessarily refer to himself. The Aegeid clan did however have a branch in Thebes, and his reference to 'my ancestors' in Pythian 5 could have been spoken on behalf of both Arcesilas and himself – he may have used this ambivalence to establish a personal link with his patrons.

He was possibly the Theban proxenos or consul for Aegina and/or Molossia, as indicated in another of his odes, Nemean 7, in which he glorifies Neoptolemus, a national hero of Aegina and Molossia. According to tradition, Neoptolemus died disgracefully in a fight with priests at the temple in Delphi over their share of some sacrificial meat. Pindar diplomatically glosses over this and concludes mysteriously with an earnest protestation of innocence – "But shall my heart never admit that I with words none can redeem dishonoured Neoptolemus". Possibly he was responding to anger among Aeginetans and/or Molossians over his portrayal of Neoptolemus in an earlier poem, Paean 6, which had been commissioned by the priests at Delphi and which depicted the hero's death in traditional terms, as divine retribution for his crimes.

Some doubt this biographical interpretation of Nemean 7 since it is largely based on marginal comments by scholiasts and Pindaric scholiasts are often unreliable. The fact that Pindar gave different versions of the myth may simply reflect the needs of different genres, and does not necessarily indicate a personal dilemma. Nemean 7 in fact is the most controversial and obscure of Pindar's victory odes, and scholars ancient and modern have been ingenious and imaginative in their attempts to explain it, so far with no agreed success.

In his first Pythian ode, composed in 470 BC in honour of the Sicilian tyrant Hieron, Pindar celebrated a series of victories by Greeks against foreign invaders: Athenian and Spartan-led victories against Persia at Salamis and Plataea, and victories by the western Greeks led by Theron of Acragas and Hieron against the Carthaginians and Etruscans at the battles of Himera and Cumae. Such celebrations were not appreciated by his fellow Thebans: they had sided with the Persians and had incurred many losses and privations as a result of their defeat. His praise of Athens with such epithets as bulwark of Hellas (fragment 76) and city of noble name and sunlit splendour (Nemean 5) induced the authorities in Thebes to fine him 5,000 drachmae, to which the Athenians are said to have responded with a gift of 10,000 drachmae. According to another account, the Athenians even made him their proxenus or consul in Thebes. His association with the fabulously rich Hieron was another source of annoyance at home. It was probably in response to Theban sensitivities over this issue that he denounced the rule of tyrants (i.e. rulers like Hieron) in an ode composed shortly after a visit to Hieron's sumptuous court in 476–75 BC (Pythian 11).

Pindar's actual phrasing in Pythian 11 was "I deplore the lot of tyrants" and though this was traditionally interpreted as an apology for his dealings with Sicilian tyrants like Hieron, an alternative date for the ode has led some scholars to conclude that it was in fact a covert reference to the tyrannical behaviour of the Athenians, although this interpretation is ruled out if we accept the earlier note about covert references. According to yet another interpretation Pindar is simply delivering a formulaic warning to the successful athlete to avoid hubris. It is highly unlikely that Pindar ever acted for Athenians as their proxenus or consul in Thebes.

Lyric verse was conventionally accompanied by music and dance, and Pindar himself wrote the music and choreographed the dances for his victory odes. Sometimes he trained the performers at his home in Thebes, and sometimes he trained them at the venue where they performed. Commissions took him to all parts of the Greek world – to the Panhellenic festivals in mainland Greece (Olympia, Delphi, Corinth and Nemea), westwards to Sicily, eastwards to the seaboard of Asia Minor, north to Macedonia and Abdera (Paean 2) and south to Cyrene on the African coast. Other poets at the same venues vied with him for the favours of patrons. His poetry sometimes reflects this rivalry. For example, Olympian 2 and Pythian 2, composed in honour of the Sicilian tyrants Theron and Hieron following his visit to their courts in 476–75 BC, refer respectively to ravens and an ape, apparently signifying rivals who were engaged in a campaign of smears against him – possibly the poets Simonides and his nephew Bacchylides. Pindar's original treatment of narrative myth, often relating events in reverse chronological order, is said to have been a favourite target for criticism. Simonides was known to charge high fees for his work and Pindar is said to have alluded to this in Isthmian 2, where he refers to the Muse as "a hireling journeyman". He appeared in many poetry competitions and was defeated five times by his compatriot, the poet Corinna, in revenge of which he called her Boeotian sow in one of his odes (Olympian 6. 89f.).

It was assumed by ancient sources that Pindar's odes were performed by a chorus, but this has been challenged by some modern scholars, who argue that the odes were in fact performed solo. It is not known how commissions were arranged, nor if the poet travelled widely: even when poems include statements like "I have come" it is not certain that this was meant literally. Uncomplimentary references to Bacchylides and Simonides were found by scholiasts but there is no reason to accept their interpretation of the odes. In fact, some scholars have interpreted the allusions to fees in Isthmian 2 as a request by Pindar for payment of fees owed to himself. His defeats by Corinna were probably invented by ancient commentators to account for the Boeotian sow remark, a phrase moreover that was completely misunderstood by scholiasts, since Pindar was scoffing at a reputation that all Boeotians had for stupidity.

==== Old age and death ====
His fame as a poet drew Pindar into Greek politics. Athens, the most important city in Greece throughout his poetic career, was a rival of his home city, Thebes, and also of the island state Aegina, whose leading citizens commissioned about a quarter of his Victory Odes. There is no open condemnation of the Athenians in any of his poems but criticism is implied. For example, the victory ode mentioned above (Pythian 8) describes the downfall of the giants Porphyrion and Typhon and this might be Pindar's way of covertly celebrating a recent defeat of Athens by Thebes at the Battle of Coronea (447 BC). The poem ends with a prayer for Aegina's freedom, long threatened by Athenian ambitions.

Covert criticism of Athens (traditionally located in odes such as Pythian 8, Nemean 8 and Isthmian 7) is now dismissed as highly unlikely, even by scholars who allow some biographical and historical interpretations of the poems.

One of his last odes (Pythian 8) indicates that he lived near a shrine to the oracle Alcmaeon and that he stored some of his wealth there. In the same ode he says that he had recently received a prophecy from Alcmaeon during a journey to Delphi ("...he met me and proved the skills of prophecy that all his race inherit") but he does not reveal what the long-dead prophet said to him nor in what form he appeared. (Note: There are several other accounts of supernatural visitations relating to Pindar (see for example C.M. Bowra, Pindar, pages 49–51). According to a scholium, he and a pupil, Olympichus, once saw a mysterious flame on a mountain, attended by strange noises. Pindar then beheld Rhea, the Mother of the Gods, advancing in the form of a wooden image. Pausanias (9.25.3) reported that he set up a monument near his home, dedicated conjointly to Pan and the Mother of the Gods (Δινδυμήνη). According to Eustathius (Proem. 27, p. 298. 9 Dr) and Vit. Ambr. (p. 2. 2 Dr.), Pan was once heard between Cithaeron and Helicon singing a paean composed to him by Pindar (fr. 85).) The ode was written to commemorate a victory by an athlete from Aegina.

Pindar doesn't necessarily mean himself when he uses the first person singular. Many of his 'I' statements are generic, indicating somebody engaged in the role of a singer i.e. a 'bardic' I. Other 'I' statements articulate values typical of the audience, and some are spoken on behalf of the subjects celebrated in the poems. The 'I' that received the prophecy in Pythian 8 therefore might have been the athlete from Aegina, not Pindar. In that case the prophecy must have been about his performance at the Pythian Games, and the property stored at the shrine was just a votive offering.

Nothing is recorded about Pindar's wife and son except their names, Megacleia and Daiphantus.

About ten days before he died, the goddess Persephone appeared to him and complained that she was the only divinity to whom he had never composed a hymn. She said he would come to her soon and compose one then.

Pindar lived to about eighty years of age. He died around 438 BC while attending a festival at Argos. His ashes were taken back home to Thebes by his musically gifted daughters, Eumetis and Protomache.

==== Post mortem ====
One of Pindar's female relatives claimed that he dictated some verses to her in honour of Persephone after he had been dead for several days. Some of Pindar's verses were inscribed in letters of gold on a temple wall in Lindos, Rhodes. At Delphi, where he had been elected a priest of Apollo, the priests exhibited an iron chair on which he used to sit during the festival of the Theoxenia. Every night, while closing the temple doors, they intoned: "Let Pindar the poet go unto the supper of the gods!"

Pindar's house in Thebes became one of the city's landmarks. When Alexander the Great demolished Thebes in 335 BC, as punishment for its resistance to Macedonian expansionism, he ordered the house be left intact out of gratitude for verses praising his ancestor, Alexander I of Macedon.

=== Values and beliefs ===
Pindar's values and beliefs have been inferred from his poetry. No other ancient Greek poet has left so many comments about the nature of his art. He justified and exalted choral poetry at a time when society was turning away from it. It "... had for two centuries reflected and shaped the sentiments, the outlook, and the convictions of the Greek aristocracies ... and Pindar spoke up for it with passionate assurance". His poetry is a meeting ground for gods, heroes and men – even the dead are spoken of as participants: "Deep in the earth their heart listens".

His view of the gods is traditional but more self-consistent than Homer's and more reverent. He never depicts gods in a demeaning role. He seems indifferent to the intellectual reforms that were shaping the theology of the times. Thus an eclipse is not a mere physical effect, as contemplated by early thinkers such as Thales, Anaximander and Heraclitus, nor was it even a subject for bold wonder, as it was for an earlier poet, Archilochus; instead Pindar treated an eclipse as a portent of evil. (Note: Paean 9.13–20). The eclipse is mentioned in a fragment quoted by Stobaeus, addressed to the Thebans: Is it some sign of war you bring? / Or blight on crops, or snow-fall's strength / Beyond all telling, or murderous strife at home, / Or emptying of the sea on land, / Or frost binding the earth, or south-wind in summer / With a flood of furious rain, / Or will you drown the land and raise / A new breed of men from the beginning?)

Gods are the embodiment of power, uncompromisingly proud of their nature and violent in defense of their privileges. There is some rationalization of religious belief, but it is within a tradition at least as old as Hesiod, where abstractions are personified, such as "Truth the daughter of Zeus". Sometimes the wording suggests a belief in 'God' rather than 'a god' (e.g. "What is God? Everything"), (Note: fr. 129: τί θεός; τὸ πάν) but the implications are not given full expression and the poems are not examples of monotheism. Nor do they vocalize a belief in Fate as the background to the gods, unlike the plays of Aeschylus for example. Pindar subjects both fortune and fate to divine will (e.g. "child of Zeus ... Fortune").

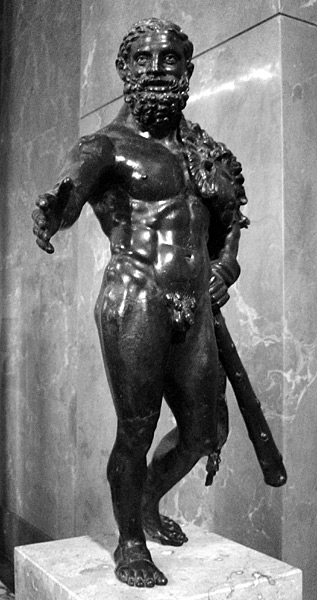
A short Heracles: Pindar once ignored the traditional image of Heracles, the supreme example of the heroic physique, and described him as short in order to compare him with a short patron.

He selects and revises traditional myths so as not to diminish the dignity and majesty of the gods. Such revisionism was not unique. Xenophanes had castigated Homer and Hesiod for the misdeeds they ascribed to gods, such as theft, adultery and deception, and Pythagoras had envisioned those two poets being punished in Hades for blasphemy. A subtle example of Pindar's approach can be found in his treatment of the myth of Apollo's rape of the nymph Cyrene. As the god of the Delphic oracle, Apollo is all-knowing, yet in keeping with his anthropomorphic nature he seeks information about the nymph from a third party, in this case the centaur Chiron. Chiron however affirms the god's omniscience with an elegant compliment, as if Apollo had only pretended to be ignorant: "You, Sire, who know the appointed end of all, and all paths..." (Note: Chiron's compliment to Apollo: "You, Sire, who know / The appointed end of all, and all paths: / How many leaves in April the earth puts forth, / How many grains of sand / In the sea and rivers / Are troubled by the waves and the swirling winds, / And what shall be, and whence it shall come / You see with clear eyes.") Apollo's abduction of the nymph is not presented as a shameful act. Pindar's gods are above such ethical issues and it is not for men to judge them by ordinary human standards. Indeed, the finest breeds of men resulted from divine passions: "For Pindar a mortal woman who is loved by a god is an outstanding lesson in divine favours handsomely bestowed".

Being descendants of divine unions with privileged mortals, mythical heroes are an intermediate group between gods and men, and they are sympathetic to human ambitions. Thus, for example, Pindar not only invokes Zeus for help on behalf of the island of Aegina but also its national heroes Aeacus, Peleus and Telamon. Unlike the gods, however, heroes can be judged according to ordinary human standards and they are sometimes shown in the poems to demean themselves. Even in that case, they receive special consideration. Thus Pindar refers obliquely to the murder of Phocus by his brothers Peleus and Telamon ("I am shy of speaking of a huge risk, hazarded not in right"), telling the audience that he will not talk of it ("silence is a man's wisest counsel"). (Note: Nemean Odes 5.14–18: I am shy of speaking of a huge risk / Hazarded not in right, / How they left the famous island, / And what fate drove strong men from the Vineland. / I shall halt. Truth does not always / Gain more if unflinching / She reveals her face; / And silence is often a man's wisest counsel.) The Theban hero Heracles was a favourite subject but in one poem he is depicted as small in order to be compared with a small Theban patron who had won the pankration at the Isthmian Games: a unique example of Pindar's readiness to shape traditional myths to fit the occasion, even if not always flattering to the mythical hero. A hero's status is not diminished by an occasional blemish but rests on a summary view of his heroic exploits.

Some of his patrons claimed divine descent, such as Diagoras of Rhodes, but Pindar makes all men akin to gods if they realize their full potential: their innate gifts are divinely bestowed, and even then success still depends on the gods' active favour. In honouring such men, therefore, Pindar was honouring the gods too. His statements about life after death were not self-consistent but that was typical for the times. Traditional ambivalence, as expressed by Homer, had been complicated by a growth of religious sects, such as the Eleusinian Mysteries and Pythagoreanism, representing various schemes of rewards and punishments in the next life. However, for the poet, glory and lasting fame were men's greatest assurance of a life well-lived. He presents no theory of history apart from the view that Fortune is variable even for the best men, an outlook suited to moderation in success, courage in adversity. Notions of 'good' and 'bad' in human nature were not analysed by him in any depth nor did he arrive at anything like the compassionate ethics of his near contemporary, Simonides of Ceos. His poems are indifferent to the ordinary mass of people. They are dismissed with phrases such as "the brute multitude" (Pythian Ode 2.87). Nor are the poems concerned with the fate of rich and powerful men once they lose their wealth and social status (compared for example with the bitter and disillusioned poems of Theognis of Megara). They are more interested in what successful men do with their good fortune: success brings obligations, and religious and artistic activities need patrons.

Whereas the Muses inspired Homer with relevant information and with the language to express it, Pindar seems to receive only their inspiration: his role is to shape that inspiration with his own wisdom and skill. Like his patrons, whom he immortalizes in verse, he owes his success to hard work as well as to innate gifts; though he hires himself out, he has a vocation. The Muses are to him as an oracle is to a prophet, and lesser poets are to him as ravens are to an eagle; the art of such men is as hackneyed as garland-making; his is magical:

εἴρειν στεφάνους ἐλαφρόν: ἀναβάλεο: Μοῖσά τοι
κολλᾷ χρυσὸν ἔν τε λευκὸν ἐλέφανθ᾽ ἁμᾷ
καὶ λείριον ἄνθεμον ποντίας ὑφελοῖσ᾽ ἐέρσας.

To plait garlands is easy. Strike up! The Muse
Welds together gold and white ivory
And the lily-flower snatched from the sea's dew.

== Works ==
Pindar's strongly individual genius is apparent in all his extant compositions but, unlike Simonides and Stesichorus for example, he created no new lyrical genres. He was however innovative in his use of the genres he inherited – for example, in one of his victory odes (Olympian 3), he announces his invention of a new type of musical accompaniment, combining lyre, flute and human voice (though our knowledge of Greek music is too sketchy to allow us to understand the full nature of this innovation).

Although he probably spoke Boeotian Greek, he composed in a literary language that tended to rely more on the Doric dialect than his rival Bacchylides, but less insistently than Alcman. There is an admixture of other dialects, especially Aeolic and epic forms, and an occasional use of some Boeotian words.

He composed "choral" songs yet it is by no means certain that they were all sung by choirs – the use of choirs is testified only by the generally unreliable scholiasts.

Scholars at the Library of Alexandria collected his compositions in seventeen books organized according to genre:

- 1 book of hymnoi – "hymns"
- 1 book of paianes – "paeans"
- 2 books of dithyramboi – "dithyrambs"
- 2 books of prosodia – "processionals"
- 3 books of parthenia – "songs for maidens"
- 2 books of hyporchemata – "songs for light dances"
- 1 book of enkomia – "songs of praise"
- 1 book of threnoi – "laments"
- 4 books of epinikia – "victory odes"

Of this vast and varied corpus, only the epinikia – odes written to commemorate athletic victories – survive in complete form; the rest survive only by quotations in other ancient authors or from papyrus scraps unearthed in Egypt. Even in fragmentary form however, they reveal the same complexity of thought and language that are found in the victory odes.

Dionysius of Halicarnassus singled out Pindar's work as an outstanding example of austere style (αὐστηρὰ ἁρμονία) but he noted its absence in the maiden songs or parthenia. One surviving fragment of a maiden song does seem to be different in tone, due however to the fact that it is spoken in the character of a girl:

ἐμὲ δὲ πρέπει παρθενήια μὲν φρονεῖν
γλώσσᾳ τε λέγεσθαι.

emè dè prépei parthenḗia mèn phroneîn
glṓssāi te légesthai.

I must think maidenly thoughts
And utter them with my tongue.

Enough of his dithyrambic poetry survives for comparison with that of Bacchylides, who used it for narrative. Pindar's dithyrambs are an exuberant display of religious feeling, capturing the wild spirit of Dionysus and pointing forward to the ecstatic songs of Euripides' Bacchae. In one of these, dedicated to the Athenians and written to be sung in Spring, he depicts the divine energy of the revitalized world.

φοινικοεάνων ὁπότ' οἰχθέντος Ὡρᾶν θαλάμου
εὔοδμον ἐπάγοισιν ἔαρ φυτὰ νεκτάρεα.
τότε βάλλεται, τότ' ἐπ' ἀμβρόταν χθόν' ἐραταί
ἴων φόβαι, ῥόδα τε κόμαισι μείγνυται,
ἀχεῖ τ' ὀμφαὶ μελέων σὺν αὐλοῖς
οἰχνεῖ τε Σεμέλαν ἑλικάμπυκα χοροί.

phoinikoeánōn hopót' oikhthéntos Hōrân thalámou
eúodmon epágoisin eár phutà nektárea.
tóte bálletai, tót' ep' ambrótan khthón' erataí
íōn phóbai, rhóda te kómaisi meígnutai,
akheî t' omphaì meléōn sùn auloîs
oikhneî te Semélan helikámpuka khoroí.

When the chamber of the scarlet-clothed Hours is opened
And the nectareous flowers usher in the fragrant spring,
Then are scattered, then, on the immortal ground
The lovely petals of violets; roses are wound in our hair;
Loudly echo the voices of songs to the flutes,
And choirs step in procession to dark-ribboned Semele.

=== Victory odes ===
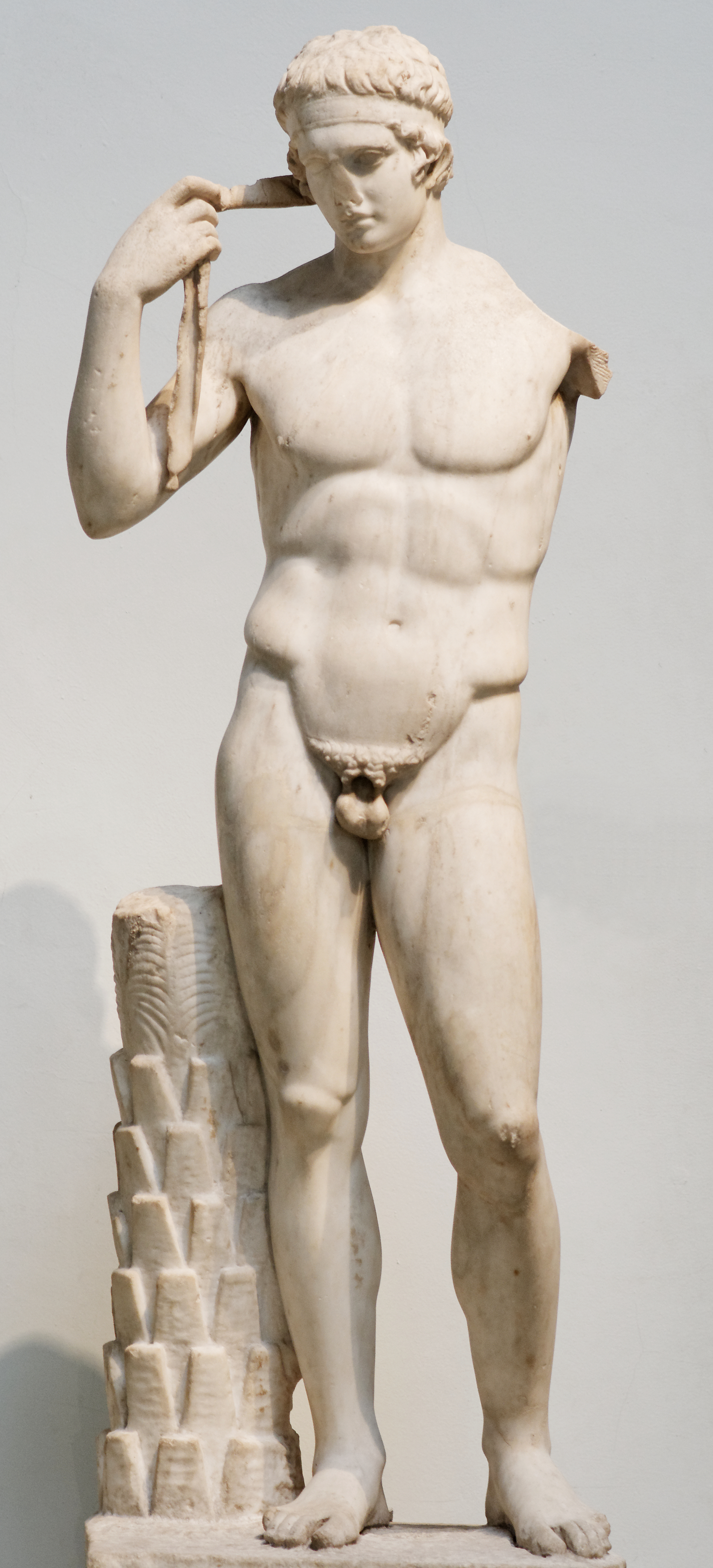
The so-called 'Farnese Diadumenos' is a Roman copy of a Greek original attributed to Polykleitos c. 440 BC, depicting an athlete tying a victory ribbon round his head.

Almost all Pindar's victory odes are celebrations of triumphs gained by competitors in Panhellenic festivals such as the Olympian Games. The establishment of these athletic and musical festivals was among the greatest achievements of the Greek aristocracies. Even in the 5th century BC, when there was an increased tendency towards professionalism, they were predominantly aristocratic assemblies, reflecting the expense and leisure needed to attend such events either as a competitor or spectator. Attendance was an opportunity for display and self-promotion, and the prestige of victory, requiring commitment in time and/or wealth, went far beyond anything that accrues to athletic victories today, even in spite of the modern preoccupation with sport. Pindar's odes capture something of the prestige and the aristocratic grandeur of the moment of victory, as in this stanza from one of his Isthmian Odes, here translated by Geoffrey S. Conway:

If ever a man strives
With all his soul's endeavour, sparing himself
Neither expense nor labour to attain
True excellence, then must we give to those
Who have achieved the goal, a proud tribute
Of lordly praise, and shun
All thoughts of envious jealousy.
To a poet's mind the gift is slight, to speak
A kind word for unnumbered toils, and build
For all to share a monument of beauty. (Isthmian I, antistrophe 3)

His victory odes are grouped into four books named after the Olympian, Pythian, Isthmian, and Nemean Games – Panhellenic festivals held respectively at Olympia, Delphi, Corinth and Nemea. This reflects the fact that most of the odes were composed in honour of boys, youths, and men who had recently enjoyed victories in athletic (and sometimes musical) contests at those festivals. In a few odes however much older victories, and even victories in lesser games, are celebrated, often as a pretext for addressing other issues or achievements. For example, Pythian 3, composed in honour of Hieron of Syracuse, briefly mentions a victory he had once enjoyed at the Pythian Games, but it is actually intended to console him for his chronic illness (similarly, Pythian 2 is like a private letter in its intimacy). Nemean 9 and Nemean 10 celebrate victories in games at Sicyon and Argos, and Nemean 11 celebrates a victory in a municipal election on Tenedos (though it also mentions some obscure athletic victories). These three odes are the final odes in the Nemean book of odes, and there is a reason for their inclusion. In the original manuscripts, the four books of odes were arranged in the order of importance assigned to the festivals, with the Nemean festival, considered least important, coming last. Victory odes that lacked a Panhellenic subject were then bundled together at the end of the book of Nemean odes.

==== Style ====
Pindar's poetic style is very distinctive, even when the peculiarities of the genre are set aside. The odes typically feature a grand and arresting opening, often with an architectural metaphor or a resounding invocation to a place or goddess. He makes rich use of decorative language and florid compound adjectives. Sentences are compressed to the point of obscurity, unusual words and periphrases give the language an esoteric quality, and transitions in meaning often seem erratic, the images seem to burst out – it is a style that sometimes baffles but also makes his poetry vivid and unforgettable.

Pindar's power does not lie in the pedigrees of ... athletes ... It lies in a splendour of phrase and imagery that suggests the gold and purple of a sunset sky. – F. L. Lucas

He has that force of imagination which can bring clear-cut and dramatic figures of gods and heroes into vivid relief...he has that peculiar and inimitable splendour of style which, though sometimes aided by magnificent novelties of diction, is not dependent on them, but can work magical effects with simple words; he has also, at frequent moments, a marvellous swiftness, alike in the succession of images, and in the transitions from thought to thought; and his tone is that of a prophet who can speak with a voice as of Delphi. – Richard Claverhouse Jebb

His odes were animated by...

one burning glow which darted out a shower of brilliant images, leapt in a white-hot spark across gaps unbridgeable by thought, passed through a commonplace leaving it luminous and transparent, melted a group of heterogeneous ideas into a shortlived unity and, as suddenly as a flame, died. – Gilbert Highet

Some of these qualities can be found, for example, in this stanza from Pythian 2, composed in honour of Hieron:

θεὸς ἅπαν ἐπὶ ἐλπίδεσσι τέκμαρ ἀνύεται,
θεός, ὃ καὶ πτερόεντ᾽ αἰετὸν κίχε, καὶ θαλασ-
:σαῖον παραμείβεται δελφῖνα, καὶ ὑψιφρόνων τιν᾽ ἔκαμψε βροτῶν,
ἑτέροισι δὲ κῦδος ἀγήραον παρέδωκ᾽. ἐμὲ δὲ χρεὼν
φεύγειν δάκος ἀδινὸν κακαγοριᾶν.
εἶδον γὰρ ἑκὰς ἐὼν τὰ πόλλ᾽ ἐν ἀμαχανίᾳ
ψογερὸν Ἀρχίλοχον βαρυλόγοις ἔχθεσιν
πιαινόμενον: τὸ πλουτεῖν δὲ σὺν τύχᾳ πό-
:τμου σοφίας ἄριστον.

God achieves all his purpose and fulfills his every hope,
God who can overtake the winged eagle, or upon the sea

outstrip the dolphin;

and he bends the arrogant heart of many a man,
But gives to others eternal glory that will never fade. Now for me
Is it needful that I shun the fierce and biting tooth of slanderous words.
For from old have I seen sharp-tongued Archilochus in want and struggling,
Grown fat on the harsh words of hate.
The best that fate can bring is wealth

joined with the happy gift of wisdom.

The stanza begins with a celebration of divine power, and then abruptly shifts to a darker, more allusive train of thought, featuring condemnation of a renowned poet, Archilochus, Grown fat on the harsh words of hate. Archilochus was an iambic poet, working within a genre that licensed abusive and scurrilous verse – a regrettable tendency from the viewpoint of Pindar, whose own persona is intensely earnest, preaching to Hieron the need for moderation (wealth with wisdom) and submission to the divine will. The reference to the embittered poet appears to be Pindar's meditative response to some intrigues at Hieron's court, possibly by his rivals, condemned elsewhere as a pair of ravens (Olympian 2). The intensity of the stanza suggests that it is the culmination and climax of the poem. In fact, the stanza occupies the middle of Pythian 2 and the intensity is sustained throughout the poem from beginning to end. It is the sustained intensity of his poetry that Quintilian refers to above as a rolling flood of eloquence and Horace below refers to as the uncontrollable momentum of a river that has burst its banks. Longinus likens him to a vast fire and Athenaeus refers to him as the great-voiced Pindar.

Pindar's treatment of myth is another unique aspect of his style, often involving variations on the traditional stories, since his original audience was familiar with the myths and this allowed him to concentrate on unique and surprising effects. Reversing the chronological order was one such effect, as in Olympian VII dedicated to Diagoras of Rhodes, but this could also resemble a circular pattern, beginning with a culminating event, followed by scenes leading up to it, and ending with its restatement, as in his account of the Dioscuri in Nemean 10. Myths enabled him to develop the themes and lessons that pre-occupy him – in particular mankind's exulted relation with the gods via heroic ancestors and, in contrast, the limitations and uncertainties of human existence – but sometimes the traditional stories were an embarrassment and were carefully edited, as for example: "Be still my tongue: here profits not / to tell the whole truth with clear face unveiled," (Nemean 5, epode 1); "Away, away this story! / Let no such tale fall from my lips! / For to insult the gods is a fool's wisdom," (Olympian 9, strophe 2); "Senseless, I hold it, for a man to say / the gods eat mortal flesh. / I spurn the thought," (Olympian 1, epode 2). His mythical accounts are edited for dramatic and graphic effects, usually unfolding through a few grand gestures against a background of large, often symbolic elements such as sea, sky, darkness, fire or mountain.

==== Structure ====
Pindar's odes typically begin with an invocation to a god or the Muses, followed by praise of the victor and often of his family, ancestors and home-town. Then follows a narrated myth, usually occupying the central and longest section of the poem, which exemplify a moral, while aligning the poet and his audience with the world of gods and heroes. The ode usually ends in more eulogies, for example of trainers (if the victor is a boy), and of relatives who have won past events, as well as with prayers or expressions of hope for future success. The event where the victory was gained is never described in detail, but there is often some mention of the hard work needed to bring the victory about.

A lot of modern criticism tries to find hidden structure or some unifying principle within the odes. 19th century criticism favoured 'gnomic unity' i.e. that each ode is bound together by the kind of moralizing or philosophic vision typical of archaic Gnomic poetry. Later critics sought unity in the way certain words or images are repeated and developed within a particular ode. For others, the odes are just celebrations of men and their communities, in which the elements such as myths, piety, and ethics are stock themes that the poet introduces without much real thought. Some conclude that the requirement for unity is too modern to have informed Pindar's ancient approach to a traditional craft.

The great majority of the odes are triadic in structure – i.e., stanzas are grouped together in threes as a lyrical unit. Each triad comprises two stanzas identical in length and meter (called 'strophe' and 'antistrophe') and a third stanza (called an 'epode'), differing in length and meter but rounding off the lyrical movement in some way. The shortest odes comprise a single triad, the largest (Pythian 4) comprises thirteen triads. Seven of the odes however are monostrophic (i.e., each stanza in the ode is identical in length and meter). The monostrophic odes seem to have been composed for victory marches or processions, whereas the triadic odes appear suited to choral dances. Pindar's metrical rhythms are nothing like the simple, repetitive rhythms familiar to readers of English verse – typically the rhythm of any given line recurs infrequently (for example, only once every ten, fifteen or twenty lines). This adds to the aura of complexity that surrounds Pindar's work. In terms of meter, the odes fall roughly into two categories – about half are in dactylo-epitrites (a meter found for example in the works of Stesichorus, Simonides and Bacchylides) and the other half are in Aeolic metres based on iambs and choriambs.

==== Chronological order ====
Modern editors (e.g., Snell and Maehler in their Teubner edition), have assigned dates, securely or tentatively, to Pindar's victory odes, based on ancient sources and other grounds. The date of an athletic victory is not always the date of composition but often serves merely as a terminus post quem. Many dates are based on comments by ancient sources who had access to published lists of victors, such as the Olympic list compiled by Hippias of Elis, and lists of Pythian victors made by Aristotle and Callisthenes. There were however no such lists for the Isthmian and Nemean Games – Pausanias (6.13.8) complained that the Corinthians and Argives never kept proper records. The resulting uncertainty is reflected in the chronology below, with question marks clustered around Nemean and Isthmian entries, and yet it still represents a fairly clear general timeline of Pindar's career as an epinician poet. The code M denotes monostrophic odes (odes in which all stanzas are metrically identical) and the rest are triadic (i.e. featuring strophes, antistrophes, epodes):

Victory odes in estimated chronological order
Date (BC)	Ode	Victor	Event	Focusing myth
498	Pythian 10	Hippocles of Thessaly	Boy's long foot-race	Perseus, Hyperboreans
490	Pythian 6 (M)	Xenocrates of Acragas	Chariot-race	Antilochus, Nestor
490	Pythian 12 (M)	Midas of Acragas	Flute-Playing	Perseus, Medusa
488 (?)	Olympian 14 (M)	Asopichus of Orchomenus	Boys' foot-race	None
486	Pythian 7	Megacles of Athens	Chariot-race	None
485 (?)	Nemean 2 (M)	Timodemus of Acharnae	Pancration	None
485 (?)	Nemean 7	Sogenes of Aegina	Boys' Pentathlon	Neoptolemus
483 (?)	Nemean 5	Pythias of Aegina	Youth's Pancration	Peleus, Hippolyta, Thetis
480	Isthmian 6	Phylacides of Aegina	Pancration	Heracles, Telamon
478 (?)	Isthmian 5	Phylacides of Aegina	Pancration	Aeacids, Achilles
478	Isthmian 8 (M)	Cleandrus of Aegina	Pancration	Zeus, Poseidon, Thetis
476	Olympian 1	Hieron of Syracuse	Horse-race	Pelops
476	Olympians 2 & 3	Theron of Acragas	Chariot-race	2. Isles of the Blessed; 3. Heracles, Hyperboreans
476	Olympian 11	Agesidamus of Epizephyrian Locris	Boys' Boxing Match	Heracles, founding of Olympian Games
476 (?)	Nemean 1	Chromius of Aetna	Chariot-race	Infant Heracles
475 (?)	Pythian 2	Hieron of Syracuse	Chariot-race	Ixion
475 (?)	Nemean 3	Aristocleidas of Aegina	Pancration	Aeacides, Achilles
474 (?)	Olympian 10	Agesidamus of Epizephyrian Locris	Boys' Boxing Match	None
474 (?)	Pythian 3	Hieron of Syracuse	Horse-race	Asclepius
474	Pythian 9	Telesicrates of Cyrene	Foot-race in armour	Apollo, Cyrene
474	Pythian 11	Thrasydaeus of Thebes	Boys' short foot-race	Orestes, Clytemnestra
474 (?)	Nemean 9 (M)	Chromius of Aetna	Chariot-race	Seven against Thebes
474/3 (?)	Isthmian 3 & 4	Melissus of Thebes	Chariot race & pancration	3.None 4.Heracles, Antaeus
473 (?)	Nemean 4 (M)	Timisarchus of Aegina	Boys' Wrestling Match	Aeacids, Peleus, Thetis
470	Pythian 1	Hieron of Aetna	Chariot-race	Typhon
470 (?)	Isthmian 2	Xenocrates of Acragas	Chariot-race	None
468	Olympian 6	Agesias of Syracuse	Chariot-race with mules	Iamus
466	Olympian 9	Epharmus of Opous	Wrestling-Match	Deucalion, Pyrrha
466	Olympian 12	Ergoteles of Himera	Long foot-race	Fortune
465 (?)	Nemean 6	Alcimidas of Aegina	Boys' Wrestling Match	Aeacides, Achilles, Memnon
464	Olympian 7	Diagoras of Rhodes	Boxing-Match	Helios and Rhodos, Tlepolemus
464	Olympian 13	Xenophon of Corinth	Short foot-race & pentathlon	Bellerophon, Pegasus
462/1	Pythian 4 & 5	Arcesilas of Cyrene	Chariot-race	4.Argonauts 5.Battus
460	Olympian 8	Alcimidas of Aegina	Boys' Wrestling-Match	Aeacus, Troy
459 (?)	Nemean 8	Deinis of Aegina	Foot-race	Ajax
458 (?)	Isthmian 1	Herodotus of Thebes	Chariot-race	Castor, Iolaus
460 or 456 (?)	Olympian 4 & 5	Psaumis of Camarina	Chariot-race with mules	4.Erginus 5.None
454 (?)	Isthmian 7	Strepsiades of Thebes	Pancration	None
446	Pythian 8	Aristomenes of Aegina	Wrestling-Match	Amphiaraus
446 (?)	Nemean 11	Aristagoras of Tenedos	Inauguration as Prytanis	None
444 (?)	Nemean 10	Theaius of Argos	Wrestling-Match	Castor, Pollux

=== Manuscripts, shreds and quotes ===
Pindar's verses have come down to us in a variety of ways. Some are only preserved as fragments via quotes by ancient sources and papyri unearthed by archeologists, as at Oxyrhynchus – in fact the extant works of most of the other canonic lyric poets have survived only in this tattered form. Pindar's extant verses are unique in that the bulk of them – the victory odes – have been preserved in a manuscript tradition, i.e., generations of scribes copying from earlier copies, possibly originating in a single archetypal copy and sometimes graphically demonstrated by modern scholars in the form of a stemma codicum, resembling a 'family tree'. Pindar's victory odes are preserved in just two manuscripts, but incomplete collections are located in many others, and all date from the mediaeval period. Some scholars have traced a stemma through these manuscripts, for example Ulrich von Wilamowitz-Moellendorff, who inferred from them the existence of a common source or archetype dated no earlier than the 2nd century AD, while others, such as C.M. Bowra, have argued that there are too many discrepancies between manuscripts to identify a specific lineage, even while accepting the existence of an archetype. Otto Schroeder identified two families of manuscripts but, following on the work of Polish-born classicist, Alexander Turyn, Bowra rejected this also. Different scholars interpret the extant manuscripts differently. Bowra for example singled out seven manuscripts as his primary sources (see below), all featuring errors and/or gaps due to loss of folios and careless copying, and one arguably characterized by the dubious interpolations of Byzantine scholars. These he cross-referenced and then supplemented or verified by reference to other, still more doubtful manuscripts, and some papyrus fragments – a combination of sources on which he based his own edition of the odes and fragments. His general method of selection he defined as follows:

Where all the codices agree, there perhaps the true reading shines out. Where however they differ, the preferred reading is that which best fits the sense, meter, scholia and grammatic conventions. Wherever moreover two or more readings of equal weight are found in the codices, I have chosen that which smacks most of Pindar. Yet this difficulty rarely occurs, and in many places the true reading will be found if you examine and compare the language of the codices with that of other Greek poets and especially of Pindar himself.

Selected manuscripts: a sample of preferred sources (Bowra's choice, 1947)
Code	Source	Format	Date (century)	Odes contained
A	codex Ambrosianus C 222inf.	Paper 35×25.5 cm	13th–14th	Olympian 1–12, with some unique readings that Bowra considered reliable, and including scholia.
B	codex Vaticanus graeca 1312	Silk 24.3×18.4 cm	13th	Olympian 1 to Isthmian 8 (entire corpus), but with some leaves and verses missing, and includes scholia; Zacharias Callierges based his 1515 Roman edition on it, possibly with access to the now missing material.
C	codex Parisinus graecus 2774	Silk 23×15 cm	14th	Olympian 1 to Pythian 5, including some unique readings but also with many Byzantine interpolations/conjectures (Turyn rejected this codex accordingly), and written in a careless hand.
D	codex Laurentianus 32, 52	Silk 27×19 cm	14th	Olympian 1 to Isthmian 8 (entire corpus), including a fragment (Frag. 1) and scholia, written in a careless hand.
E	codex Laurentianus 32, 37	Silk 24×17 cm	14th	Olympian 1 to Pythian 12, largely in agreement with B, including scholia but with last page removed and replaced with paper in a later hand.
G	codex Gottingensis philologus 29	Silk 25×17 cm	13th	Olympian 2 to Pythian 12, largely in agreement with B (thus useful for comparisons), including Olympian 1 added in the 16th century.
V	codex Parisinus graecus 2403	Silk 25×17 cm	14th	Olympian 1 to Nemean 4, including some verses from Nemean 6; like G, useful for supporting and verifying B.

== Influence and legacy ==
- The influential Alexandrian poet Callimachus was fascinated by Pindar's originality. His masterpiece Aetia included an elegy in honour of Queen Berenice, celebrating a chariot victory at the Nemean Games, composed in a style and presented in a manner that recall Pindar.
- The Hellenistic epic Argonautica, by Apollonius Rhodius, was influenced by some aspects of Pindar's style and his use of episodic vignettes in narrative. The epic concerns the adventures of Jason, also touched on by Pindar in Pythian 4, and both poems link the myth to a Greek audience in Africa.
- There seems to have been a vogue for Pindaric-style lyrics following the 'publication' of Horace's Odes 1–3. Horace had mastered other styles such as Sapphic and Alcaeic, which had discouraged his contemporaries from attempting anything in the same form, but he had not composed anything in triadic stanzas in the manner of Pindar.
- Pindar was much read, quoted, and copied during the Byzantine Era. For example, Christophoros Mytilenaios of the 11th century parodied a chariot race in his sixth poem, employing explicit allusions to Pindar.
- During the 17th and 18th centuries, literary theorists in Europe distinguished between two types of lyric poetry, loosely associated with Horace and Pindar. Regular verses in four line stanzas were associated with Horace's Odes, which did in fact inspire and influence poets of the period. Irregular verses in longer stanzas were termed Pindarics, though the association with Pindar was largely fanciful. Abraham Cowley was considered the main exponent of English Pindarics. In fact, the two styles were not always easy to distinguish and many 'Pindaric' odes were quite Horatian in content, as in some poems by Thomas Gray.
- A 'Pindaric Ode' was composed for the revived 1896 Olympic Games in Athens by the Oxford scholar George Stuart Robinson, and similar compositions were commissioned from and composed by classicist Armand D'Angour for the Athens Olympics in 2004 and the London Olympics in 2012.

=== Horace's tribute ===
The Latin poet Quintus Horatius Flaccus was an admirer of Pindar's style. He described it in one of his Sapphic poems, addressed to a friend, Iullus Antonius:

Pindarum quisquis studet aemulari,
Iule, ceratis ope Daedalea
nititur pennis vitreo daturus
nomina ponto.

monte decurrens velut amnis, imbres
quem super notas aluere ripas,
fervet immensusque ruit profundo
Pindarus ore. (C.IV.II)

Julus, whoever tries to rival Pindar,
Flutters on wings of wax, a rude contriver
Doomed like the son of Daedalus to christen
Somewhere a shining sea.

A river bursts its banks and rushes down a
Mountain with uncontrollable momentum,
Rain-saturated, churning, chanting thunder –
There you have Pindar's style.

=== Bowra's tribute ===
C. M. Bowra, the leading Pindaric scholar of his generation and the editor of the 1935 OUP edition of his poems, summarized Pindar's qualities in the following words:

His innate, unquestioning pride in his poetical mission means that he gives to it all his gifts and all his efforts. The result is a poetry that by any standards deserves the name because it is based on a radiant vision of reality and fashioned with so subtle, so adventurous, and so dedicated an art that it is worthy to be an earthly counterpart of the songs which Pindar regards as the archetype of music on those lofty occasions when all discords are resolved and all misgivings obliterated by the power of the life-giving word.

== See also ==
- John Wolcot

== Sources ==
- Bowie, Ewen, 'Lyric and Elegiac Poetry' in The Oxford History of the Classical World, J. Boardman, J. Griffin and O. Murray (eds), Oxford University Press (1986) ISBN 0-19-872112-9
- Bowra, C. M. (1947). Pindari Carmina Cum Fragmentis, Editio Altera. Oxford University Press.
- Bowra, Cecil Maurice (1964). Pindar. Clarendon Press. pp. 446. ISBN 978-0-19-814338-3.
- Campbell, David A. (1992). Greek Lyric IV: Bacchylides, Corinna and Others. Loeb Classical Library. ISBN 978-0-674-99508-6.
- Conway, Geoffrey Seymour (1972), The Odes of Pindar, Dent ISBN 978-0-460-01017-7
- Currie, Bruno (2005), Pindar and the Cult of Heroes, Oxford University Press ISBN 0-19-161516-1
- De Romilly, Jacqueline (1985), A Short History of Greek Literature, University of Chicago Press
- Easterling, P. E.; Knox, Bernard, eds. (1985). "Greek Literature". The Cambridge History of Classical Greek Literature. Cambridge University Press.
- Gerber, Douglas E. (1997) A Companion to the Greek lyric poets, Brill ISBN 90-04-09944-1
- Hornblower, Simon (2004). Thucydides and Pindar: Historical Narrative and the World of Epinikian Poetry. Oxford University Press. p. 454. ISBN 978-0-19-929828-0.
- Morice, Francis David (2009), Pindar, Bibliobazaar, LLC ISBN 1-148-33210-3
- Race, William H. (1997), Pindar: Olympian Odes, Pythian Odes, Loeb Classical Library ISBN 0-674-99564-3
