= Bacchylides =

Greek lyric poet (c. 518 – c. 451 BC)

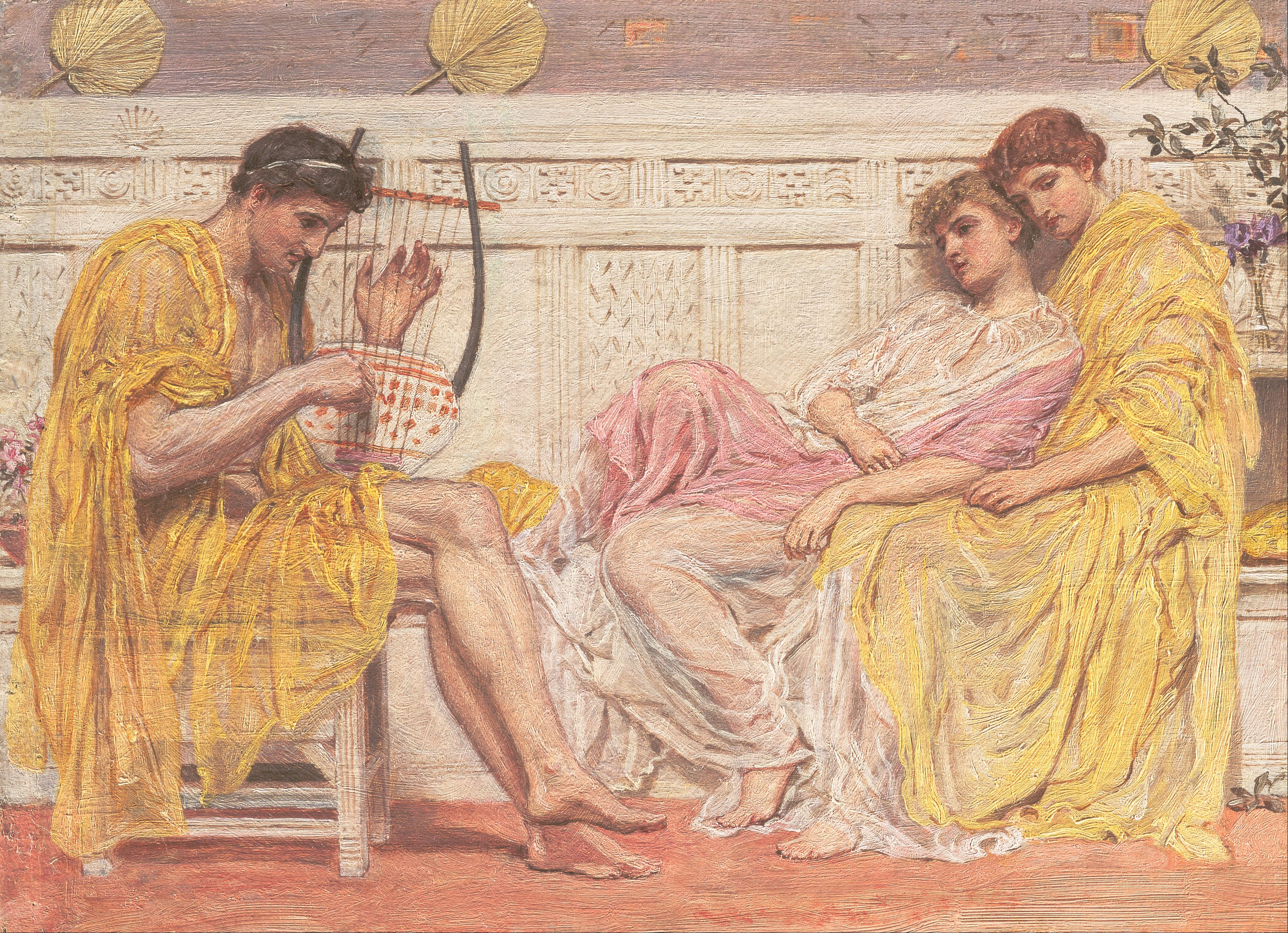
A Musician by Albert Joseph Moore

Bacchylides (/bəˈkɪlɪˌdiːz/; Ancient Greek: Βακχυλίδης Bakkhulides; c. 518 – c. 451 BC) was a Greek lyric poet. Later Greeks included him in the canonical list of Nine Lyric Poets, which included his uncle Simonides. The elegance and polished style of his lyrics have been noted in Bacchylidean scholarship since at least Longinus. Some scholars have characterized these qualities as superficial charm. He has often been compared unfavourably with his contemporary, Pindar, as "a kind of Boccherini to Pindar's Haydn". However, the differences in their styles do not allow for easy comparison, and translator Robert Fagles has written that "to blame Bacchylides for not being Pindar is as childish a judgement as to condemn ... Marvell for missing the grandeur of Milton". Some of the critique of Bacchylides comes from accusations of lack of originality and much imitation, though imitation is not unusual for ancient poets. His career coincided with the ascendency of dramatic styles of poetry, as embodied in the works of Aeschylus or Sophocles, and he is in fact considered one of the last poets of major significance within the more ancient tradition of purely lyric poetry. The most notable features of his lyrics are their clarity in expression and simplicity of thought, making them an ideal introduction to the study of Greek lyric poetry in general and to Pindar's verse in particular.

== Life ==
One canon is there, one sure way of happiness for mortals – if one can keep a cheerful spirit throughout life.

This precept, from one of Bacchylides' extant fragments, was considered by his modern editor, Richard Claverhouse Jebb, to be typical of the poet's temperament: "If the utterances scattered throughout the poems warrant a conjecture, Bacchylides was of placid temper; amiably tolerant; satisfied with a modest lot; not free from some tinge of that pensive melancholy which was peculiarly Ionian; but with good sense..."

Bacchylides' lyrics do not seem to have been popular in his own lifetime. Lyrics by his uncle, Simonides, and his rival, Pindar, were known in Athens and were sung at parties, they were parodied by Aristophanes and quoted by Plato, but no trace of Bacchylides' work can be found until the Hellenistic age, when Callimachus began writing some commentaries on them. Like Simonides and Pindar, however, Bacchylides composed lyrics to appeal to the sophisticated tastes of a social elite and his patrons, though relatively few in number, covered a wide geographical area around the Mediterranean, including for example Delos in the Aegean Sea, Thessaly in the north of the Greek mainland, and Sicily or Magna Graecia in the west. It has been inferred from the elegance and quiet charm of his lyrics that he only gradually acquired fame towards the end of his life.

Being drawn from sources compiled long after his death, the details of Bacchylides's life are sketchy and sometimes contradictory. According to Strabo, he was born in Ioulis, on the island of Keos, and his mother was the sister of Simonides. According to Suda, his father's name was Meidon and his grandfather, also named Bacchylides, was a famous athlete, yet according to Etymologicum Magnum his father's name was Meidylus. There is an ancient tradition, upheld for example by Eustathius and Thomas Magister, that he was younger than Pindar and some modern scholars have endorsed it, such as Jebb, who assigns his birth to around 507 BC, whereas Bowra, for example, opted for a much earlier date, around 524–1 BC. Most modern scholars however treat Bacchylides as an exact contemporary of Pindar, placing his birth around 518 BC. According to one account, Bacchylides was banished for a time from his native Keos and spent this period as an exile in Peloponnesus, where his genius ripened and he did the work which established his fame. Plutarch is the only ancient source for this account and yet it is considered credible on the basis of some literary evidence (Pindar wrote a paean celebrating Keos, in which he says on behalf of the island "I am renowned for my athletic achievements among Greeks" [Paean 4, epode 1], a circumstance that suggests that Bacchylides himself was unavailable at the time.) Observations by Eusebius and Georgius Syncellus can be taken to indicate that Bacchylides might have been still alive at the outbreak of the Peloponnesian War, but modern scholars have differed widely in estimates of the year of his death – Jebb, for example sets it at 428 BC and yet a date around 451 BC is more favoured.

Keos, where Bacchylides was born and raised, had long had a history of poetical and musical culture, especially in its association with Delos, the focal point of the Cyclades and the principal sanctuary of the Ionian race, where the people of Keos annually sent choirs to celebrate festivals of Apollo. There was a thriving cult of Apollo on Keos too, including a temple at Carthaea, a training ground for choruses where, according to Athenaeus, Bacchylides's uncle, Simonides, had been a teacher in his early years. Ceans had a strong sense of their national identity, characterized by their own exotic legends, national folklore and a successful tradition of athletic competition, especially in running and boxing – making the island a congenial home for a boy of quick imagination. Athletic victories achieved by Ceans in panhellenic festivals were recorded at Ioulis on slabs of stone and thus Bacchylides could readily announce, in an ode celebrating one such victory (Ode 2), a total of twenty-seven victories won by his countrymen at the Isthmian Games. Ceans had participated in the defeat of the Persians at the Battle of Salamis and they could take pride in the fact that an elegy composed by Bacchylides's uncle was chosen by Athens to commemorate the Athenians who fell at the Battle of Marathon. Being only thirteen miles from the Athenian cape Sunium, Keos was in fact necessarily responsive to Athenian influences.

Bacchylides's career as a poet probably benefited from the high reputation of his uncle, Simonides, whose patrons, when Bacchylides was born, already included Hipparchus, brother of Hippias the tyrant of Athens (527–10 BC) and cultural coordinator of the city at that time. Simonides later introduced his nephew to ruling families in Thessaly and to the Sicilian tyrant, Hieron of Syracuse, whose glittering court attracted artists of the calibre of Pindar and Aeschylus. Bacchylides's first notable success came sometime after 500 BC with commissions from Athens for the great Delian festival (Ode 17) and from Macedonia for a song to be sung at a symposium for the young prince, Alexander I (fr. 20B). Soon he was competing with Pindar for commissions from the leading families of Aegina and, in 476 BC, their rivalry seems to have reached the highest levels when Bacchylides composed an ode celebrating Hieron's first victory at the Olympian Games (Ode 5). Pindar celebrated the same victory but used the occasion to advise the tyrant of the need for moderation in one's personal conduct (Pindar's Olympian Ode 1), whereas Bacchylides probably offered his own ode as a free sample of his skill in the hope of attracting future commissions. Bacchylides was commissioned by Hieron in 470 BC, this time to celebrate his triumph in the chariot race at the Pythian Games (Ode 4). Pindar also composed a celebratory ode for this victory (Pindar's Pythian Ode 1), including however stern, moral advice for the tyrant to rule wisely. Pindar was not commissioned to celebrate Hieron's subsequent victory in the chariot race at the Olympic Games in 468 BC – this, the most prestigious of Hieron's victories, was however celebrated by Bacchylides (Ode 3). The tyrant's apparent preference for Bacchylides over Pindar on this occasion might have been partly due to the Cean poet's simpler language and not just to his less moralizing posture, and yet it is also possible that Bacchylides and his uncle were simply better suited to palace politics than was their more high-minded rival. Alexandrian scholars in fact interpreted a number of passages in Pindar as hostile allusions to Bacchylides and Simonides and this interpretation has been endorsed by modern scholars also.

As a composer of choral lyrics, Bacchylides was probably responsible also for the performance, involving him in frequent travel to venues where musicians and choirs awaited instruction. Ancient authorities testify to his visit to the court of Hieron (478–467) and this is indeed indicated by his fifth Ode (476 BC), where the word xenos (V.11) implies that he had already been Hieron's guest, (probably accompanied by his uncle). Verses 15 and 16 of his third ode (468 BC), also for Hieron, indicate that he might have composed that work at Syracuse.

== Work ==
=== History ===
The poems were collected into critical editions sometime in the late 3rd century BC by the Alexandrian scholar, Aristophanes of Byzantium, who probably restored them to their appropriate metres after finding them written in prose form. They were arranged in nine 'books', exemplifying the following genres (Bacchylides in fact composed in a greater variety of genres than any of the other lyric poets who comprise the canonic nine, with the exception of Pindar, who composed in ten):

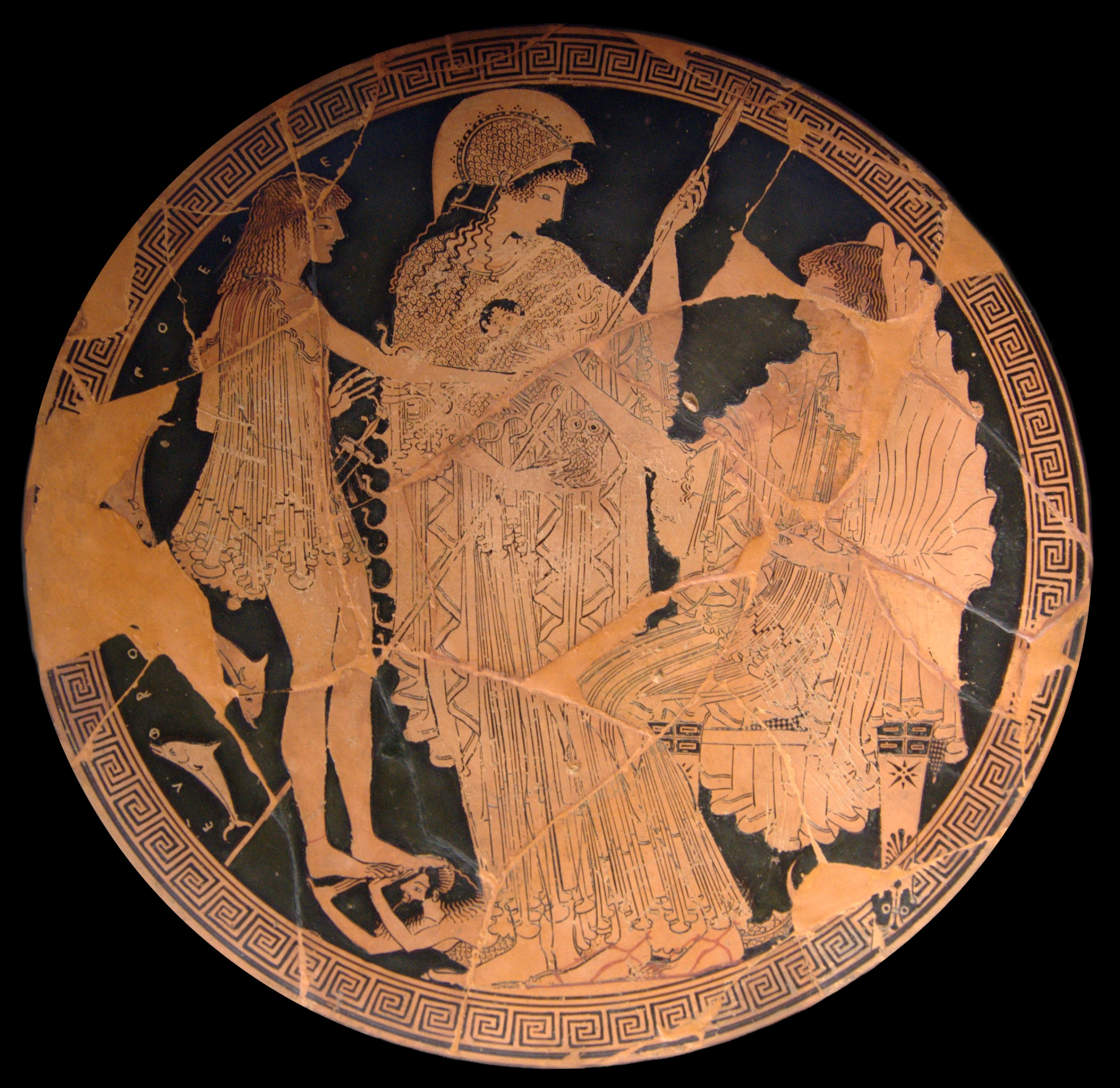
"The relation of Bacchylides to Greek art is a subject that no student of his poetry can ignore" – Richard Claverhouse Jebb. Theseus, visiting the underwater palace of his father, Poseidon, meets with Amphitrite, as witnessed by the goddess Athena and by some of the neighbourhood dolphins – here presented by the artist Euphronios. The underwater encounter is also the subject of a Bacchylides dithyramb.

- hymnoi – "hymns"
- paianes – "paeans"
- dithyramboi – "dithyrambs"
- prosodia – "processionals"
- partheneia – "songs for maidens"
- hyporchemata – "songs for light dances"
- enkomia – "songs of praise"
- epinikia – "victory odes"
- erotica – "songs of love"

The Alexandrian grammarian Didymus (circa 30 BC) wrote commentaries on the work of Bacchylides and the poems appear, from the finding of papyri fragments, to have been popular reading in the first three centuries AD. Their popularity seems to have continued into the 4th century also: Ammianus Marcellinus (xxv. 4) observed that the emperor Julian enjoyed reading Bacchylides, and the largest collection of quotations that survived up until the modern era was assembled by Stobaeus (early 5th century). All that remained of Bacchylides's poetry by 1896, however, were sixty-nine fragments, totalling 107 lines. These few remains of his writings were collected by Brunck, Bergk, Bland, Hartung, and Neue. The oldest sources on Bacchylides and his work are scholia on Homer, Hesiod, Pindar, Aristophanes, Apollonius Rhodius and Callimachus. Other fragments and 'notices' are sprinkled through the surviving works of ancient authors, which they used to illustrate various points they were making, as for example:

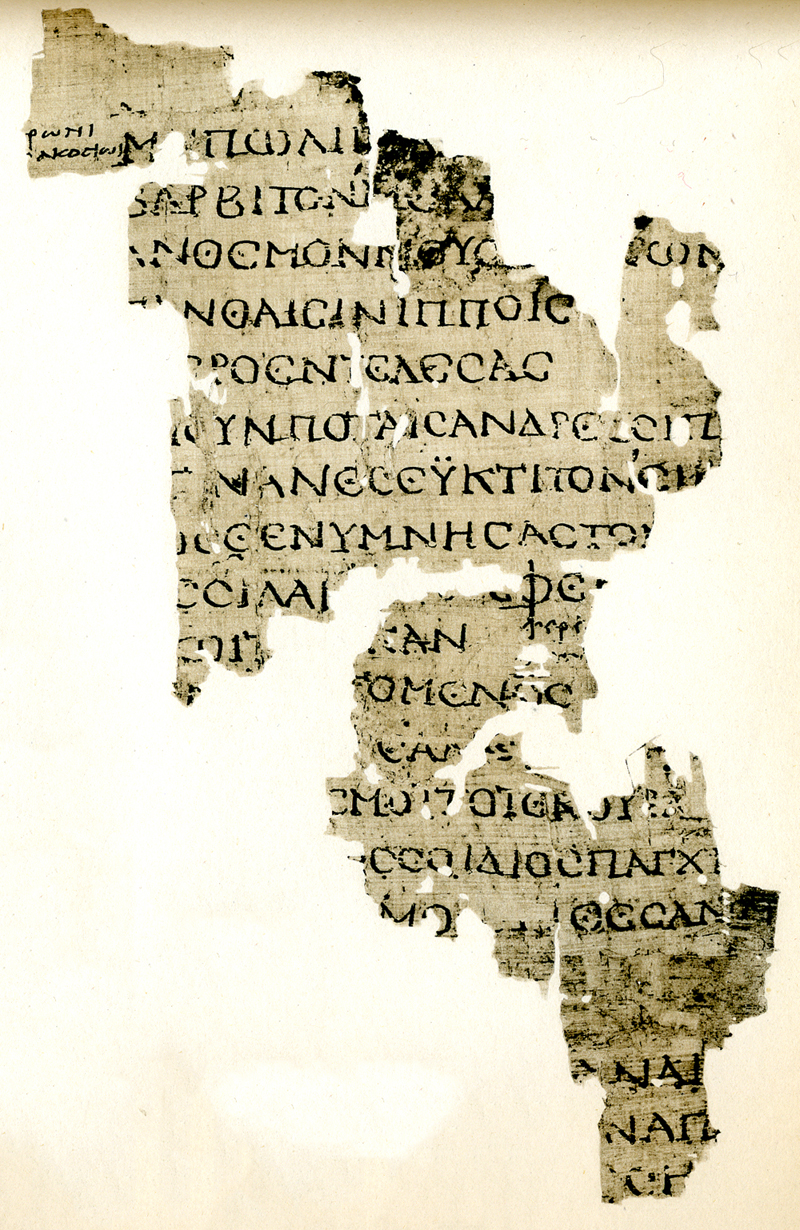
Bacchylides, Encomia fr. 5, preserved by a 1st-century BC or AD papyrus form Oxyrhynchus (P.Oxy. 1361 fr. 4).

- Dionysius of Halicarnassus – frag. 11
- Strabo – notice 57
- Plutarch – frag. 29
- Apollonius Dyscolus – frag. 31
- Zenobius – frag.s 5, 24
- Hephaestion – frag.s 12, 13, 15
- Athenaeus – frag.s 13, 16, 17, 18, 22
- Clement of Alexandria – frag.s 19, 20, 21, 32
- Stobaeus – frag.s 1, 2, 3, 7, 8, 9, 10, 20, 28
- Priscian – frag. 27
- Johannes Siceliota – frag. 26
- Etymologicum Magnum – frag.s 25, 30
- Palatine Anthology – frag.s 33, 34.

Fortunately for Bacchylidean scholarship, a papyrus came to light in Egypt at the end of the 19th century with a text of Greek uncials, which a local claimed to have found in a ransacked tomb, between the feet of a mummy. It was snapped up for a "preposterous" price by the Egyptologist Wallis Budge, of the British Museum. Budge's plan to return to the museum with the papyrus was unacceptable to the British Consul and to the Egyptian Service of Antiquities so he resorted to desperate measures. In an elaborate plan involving a crate of oranges, switched trains and covert embarkations including a midnight rendezvous with a P&O steamship, he eventually sailed from the Suez with the papyrus dismembered and disguised as a packet of photographs. He presented his find in 1896 to Frederic Kenyon in the British Museum's Department of Manuscripts. Kenyon reassembled 1382 lines, of which 1070 were perfect or easily restored and, the following year, he published an edition of twenty poems, six of them nearly complete. Some more pieces of the Egyptian fragments were fitted together by Friedrich Blass in Germany and then followed the authoritative edition of Bacchylides' poetry by Richard Claverhouse Jebb (Note: Jebb was also responsible for the expansion of Bacchylides's article for the 1911 Encyclopædia Britannica.) – a combination of scholars that inspired one academic to comment: "we almost had the Renaissance back again".

As noted by Frederic Kenyon, the papyrus was originally a roll probably about seventeen feet long and about ten inches high, written in the Ptolemaic period, with some Roman characteristics that indicate a transition between styles, somewhere around 50 BC. It reached England in about two hundred torn fragments, the largest about twenty inches in length and containing four and a half columns of writing, the smallest being scraps with barely enough space for one or two letters. The beginning and end sections were missing and the damage done to the roll was not entirely the result of its recent discovery. Kenyon gradually pieced the fragments together, making three independent sections: the first, nine feet long with twenty-two columns of writing; the next section, a little over two feet long with six columns; the third, three and a half feet long with ten columns – a total length of almost fifteen feet and thirty-nine columns, in which form the papyrus remains in the British Library. Friedrich Blass later pieced together some of the still detached fragments and concluded that two of the poems on the restored roll (Odes vi. and vii., as numbered by Kenyon in the editio princeps) must be parts of a single ode (for Lachon of Keos) – hence even today the poems can be found numbered differently, with Jebb for example one of those following Blass's lead and numbering the poems differently from Kenyon from poem 8 onwards (Kenyon 9 = Jebb 8 and so on).

Bacchylides had become, almost overnight, among the best represented poets of the canonic nine, with about half as many extant verses as Pindar, adding about a hundred new words to Greek lexicons. Ironically, his newly discovered poems sparked a renewed interest in Pindar's work, with whom he was compared so unfavourably that "the students of Pindaric poetry almost succeeded in burying Bacchylides all over again."

=== Style ===
Together with true glories, men will praise also the charm of the melodious Cean nightingale. – Bacchylides, Ode 3

Much of Bacchylides's poetry was commissioned by aristocrats, a dominant force in Greek political and cultural life in the 6th and early part of the 5th centuries. However, such patrons were gradually losing influence in an increasingly democratic Greek world. The lofty and stately poetry that celebrated the achievements of these archaic aristocrats was within the reach of 'The Cean nightingale', yet he seems to have been more at home in verses of a humbler strain, even venturing on folksiness and humour.

The distinctive merits of Bacchylides, his transparent clearness, his gift of narrative, his felicity in detail, the easy flow of his elegant verse, rather fitted him to become a favourite with readers... he was a poet who gave pleasure without demanding effort, a poet with whom the reader could at once feel at home. – Richard Claverhouse Jebb

Lyric poetry was still a vigorous art-form and its genres were already fully developed when Bacchylides started out on his career. From the time of the Peloponnesian War, around the end of his life, the art-form was in decline, as exemplified by the inferior dithyrambs of Philoxenos of Cythera. Meanwhile, tragedy, as developed by Athenian dramatists of the calibre of Aeschylus and Sophocles, had begun to emerge as the leading poetic genre, borrowing the literary dialect, the metres and poetic devices of lyric poetry in general and the dithyramb in particular (Aristotle Poetics IV 1449a). The debt however was mutual and Bacchylides borrowed from tragedy for some of his effects – thus Ode 16, with its myth of Deianeira, seems to assume audience knowledge of Sophocles's play, Women of Trachis, and Ode 18 echoes three plays – Aeschylus's Persians and Suppliants and Sophocles's Oedipus Rex. His vocabulary shows the influence of Aeschylus with several words being common to both poets and found nowhere else. The use of gripping and exciting narrative and the immediacy gained from the frequent use of direct speech are thought to be among Bacchylides's best qualities, influencing later poets such as Horace (who imitated him, according to Pomponius Porphyrion, in Carmen I. 15, where Nereus predicts the destruction of Troy). These narrative qualities were modelled largely on the work of Stesichorus, whose lyrical treatment of heroic myth influenced, for instance, Ode 5. Whereas however Stesichorus developed graphic images in his poetry that subsequently became established in vase painting, Bacchylides merely employed images already current in his own day.

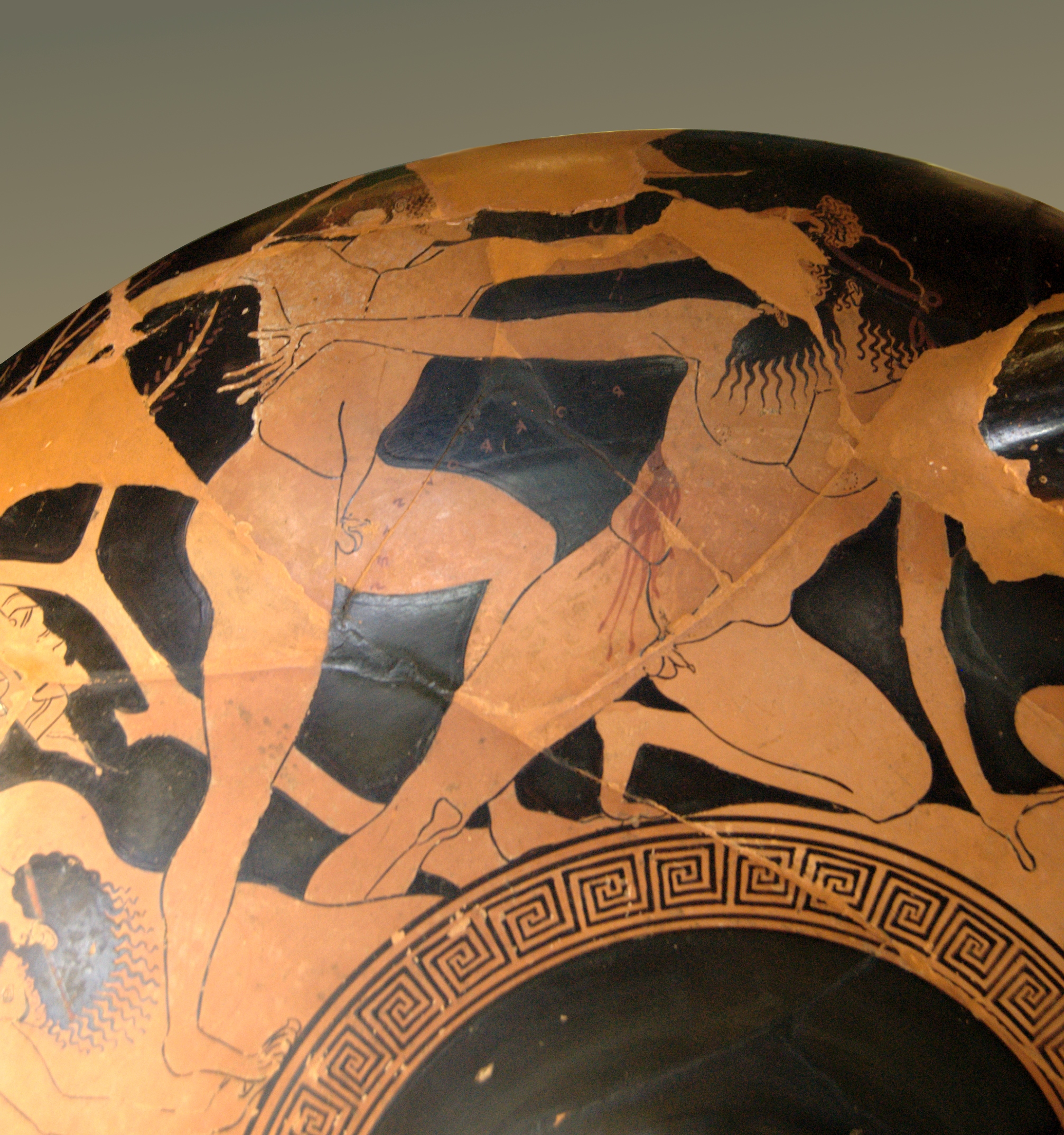
Theseus triumphing over the notorious thug Procrustes – here depicted by the artist Euphronios. Bacchylides celebrated such victories by Theseus in one of his dithyrambs, sung in the form of a dialogue between chorus and chorus-leader (poem 18).

Simonides, the uncle of Bacchylides, was another strong influence on his poetry, as for example in his metrical range, mostly dactylo-epitrite in form, with some Aeolic rhythms and a few iambics. The surviving poems in fact are not metrically difficult, with the exception of two odes (Odes XV and XVI, Jebb). He shared Simonides's approach to vocabulary, employing a very mild form of the traditional, literary Doric dialect, with some Aeolic words and some traditional epithets borrowed from epic. Like Simonides, he followed the lyric tradition of coining compound adjectives – a tradition in which the poet was expected to be both innovative and tasteful – but the results are thought by some modern scholars to be uneven. Many of his epithets however serve a thematic and not just a decorative function, as for instance in Ode 3, where the "bronze-walled court" and "well-built halls" of Croesus (Ode 3.30–31 and 3.46) contrast architecturally with the "wooden house" of his funeral pyre (Ode 3.49), in an effect that aims at pathos and which underscores the moral of the ode.

Bacchylides is renowned for his use of picturesque detail, giving life and colour to descriptions with small but skilful touches, often demonstrating a keen sense of beauty or splendour in external nature: a radiance, "as of fire," streams from the forms of the Nereids (XVI. 103 if. Jebb); an athlete shines out among his fellows like "the bright moon of the mid-month night" among the stars (VIII. 27 if.); the sudden gleam of hope which comes to the Trojans by the withdrawal of Achilles is like a ray of sunshine "from beneath the edge of a storm-cloud" (XII – 105 if.); the shades of the departed, as seen by Heracles on the banks of the Cocytus, resemble countless leaves fluttering in the wind on "the gleaming headlands of Ida" (V. 65 if ). Imagery is employed sparingly but often with impressive and beautiful results, such as in the simile of the eagle in Ode 5 below.

=== Ode 5 ===
Bacchylides has often been compared unflatteringly with Pindar, as for example by the French critic, Henri Weil: "There is no doubt that he fails of the elevation, and also of the depth, of Pindar. The soaring wing was refused him, and he should never have compared himself, as he does somewhere, to an eagle."

The image of the eagle occurs in Ode 5, which was composed for Hieron of Syracuse in celebration of his Olympic victory with the race-horse Pherenicus in 476 BC. Pindar's Olympian Ode 1 celebrates the same race and the two poems allow for some interesting comparisons. Bacchylides's Ode 5 includes, in addition to a brief reference to the victory itself, a long mythical episode on a related theme, and a gnomic or philosophical reflection – elements that occur also in Pindar's ode and that seem typical of the victory ode genre. Whereas however Pindar's ode focuses on the myth of Pelops and Tantalus and demonstrates a stern moral about the need for moderation in personal conduct (a reflection on Hieron's political excesses), Bacchylides's ode focuses on the myths of Meleager and Hercules, demonstrating the moral that nobody is fortunate or happy in all things (possibly a reflection on Hieron's chronic illness). This difference in moral posturing was typical of the two poets, with Bacchylides adopting a quieter, simpler and less forceful manner than Pindar. Frederic G. Kenyon, who edited the papyrus poems, took an unsympathetic view of Bacchylides's treatment of myth in general:

The myths are introduced mechanically, with little attempt to connect them with the subject of the ode. In some cases they appear to have no special appropriateness but to be introduced merely at the poet's pleasure. There is no originality of structure; the poet's art is shown in craftsmanship rather than in invention. – Frederic G. Kenyon

Bacchylides however might be better understood as an heir to Stesichorus, being more concerned with story-telling per se, than as a rival of Pindar. But irrespective of any scruples about his treatment of myth, Bacchylides is thought to demonstrate in Ode 5 some of his finest work and the description of the eagle's flight, near the beginning of the poem, has been called by one modern scholar "the most impressive passage in his extant poetry."

...Quickly

cutting the depth of air

on high with tawny wings

the eagle, messenger of Zeus

who thunders in wide lordship,

is bold, relying on his mighty

strength, while other birds

cower, shrill-voiced, in fear.

The great earth's mountain peaks do not hold him back,

nor the tireless sea's

rough-tossing waves, but in

the limitless expanse

he guides his fine sleek plumage

along the West Wind's breezes,
manifest to men's sight.

So now for me too countless paths extend in all directions

by which to praise your [i.e. Hieron's] prowess...(Ode 5.16–33)

Bacchylides's image of the poet as an eagle winging across the sea was not original – Pindar had already used it earlier (Nemean Odes 5.20–21). In fact, in the same year that both poets celebrated Pherenicus's Olympic victory, Pindar also composed an ode for Theron of Acragas (Olympian 2), in which he likens himself to an eagle confronted with chattering ravens – possibly a reference to Bacchylides and his uncle. It is possible in that case that Bacchylides's image of himself as an eagle in Ode 5 was a retort to Pindar. Moreover, Bacchylides's line "So now for me too countless paths extend in all directions" has a close resemblance to lines in one of Pindar's Isthmian Odes (1.1–2), "A thousand ways ... open on every side widespread before me" but, as the date of Pindar's Isthmian Ode is uncertain, it is not clear in this case who was imitating whom. According to Kenyon, Pindar's idiosyncratic genius entitles him to the benefit of a doubt in all such cases: "... if there be actual imitation at all, it is fairly safe to conclude that it is on the part of Bacchylides." In fact one modern scholar has observed in Bacchylides a general tendency towards imitation, sometimes approaching the level of quotation: in this case, the eagle simile in Ode 5 may be thought to imitate a passage in the Homeric Hymn to Demeter (375–83), and the countless leaves fluttering in the wind on "the gleaming headlands of Ida", mentioned later in the ode, recall a passage in Iliad (6.146–9). A tendency to imitate other poets is not peculiar to Bacchylides, however – it was common in ancient poetry, as for example in a poem by Alcaeus (fragment 347), which virtually quotes a passage from Hesiod (Works and Days 582–8).

Pindar's Olympian Ode 1 and Bacchylides's Ode 5 differ also in their description of the race – while Pindar's reference to Pherenicus is slight and general ("...speeding / by Alpheus' bank, / His lovely limbs ungoaded on the course...": Olympian I.20–21), Bacchylides describes the running of the winner more vividly and in rather more detail – a difference that is characteristic of the two poets: (Note: A better example of his descriptive reporting of a victory can be found in fr. 10, honouring a runner who won two events at the Isthmian games: "For when he had come to a halt at the finishing line of the sprint, panting out a hot storm of breath, and again when he had wet with his oil the cloaks of the spectators as he tumbled into the packed crowd after rounding the course with its four turns, the spokesmen of the wise judges twice proclaimed him Isthmian victor...")

When Pherenicos with his auburn mane

ran like the wind

beside the eddies of broad Alpheios,

Eos, with her arms all golden, saw his victory,

and so too at most holy Pytho.

Calling the earth to witness, I declare

that never yet has any horse outstripped him

in competition, sprinkling him with dust

as he rushed forward to the goal.

For like the North Wind's blast,

keeping the man who steers him safe,

he hurtles onward, bringing to Hieron,

that generous host, victory with its fresh applause.(Ode 5.37–49)

Ultimately, however, Bacchylides and Pindar share many of the same goals and techniques – the difference is largely one of temperament:

They share a common repertory of motifs, images, conventions, diction; and they affirm and celebrate the heroic values of an ancient aristocracy. Both seek to bridge the gap between the fleeting present in its glorious display of beauty and energy and the eternal world of the gods. Pindar however grasps the contrasts between the extremes of mortality and divinity with greater intensity than Bacchylides and for this reason seems the more philosophical and meditative, more concerned with ultimate questions of life and death, transience and permanence. Bacchylides prefers to observe the gentler play of shadow and sadness over the sensuous surface of his brilliant world. – Charles Segal

You, Pindar, holy mouth of the Muses, and you, talkative Siren, Bacchylides ...-anon. in Palatine Anthology

=== Ode 13 ===
Ode 13 of the Bacchylides is a Nemean ode performed to honor the athlete Pytheas of Aegina for winning the pancration event of the Nemean games. Bacchylides begins his ode with the tale of Heracles fighting the Nemean lion, employing the battle to explain why pancration tournaments are now held during the Nemean games. The allusion to Heracles’ fight with the lion is also meant to incite why it is that Pytheas fights for the wreaths of the games: to obtain the undying glory that the heroes of old now possess for their deeds. Bacchylides then sings the praises of Pytheas' home, the island Aegina, and how "her fame excites a dancer’s praise." Bacchylides continues this dancer allusion in praise of Aegina, and ends it by listing some famous men who were born on the island, namely Peleus and Telamon. Bacchylides then tells of the greatness of these men’s sons, Achilles and Ajax, alluding to a second myth, the tale of Ajax repelling Hector on the beaches of Troy, keeping the Trojans from burning the Greek ships. Bacchylides relates how Achilles’ inaction spurred the Trojans to false hope, and how their swollen pride led them to be destroyed at the hands of the men they thought they had vanquished. The ode plays upon the fact that those who are listening to Bacchylides have also read the epics of Homer, and understand the whole story behind this scene that would speak poorly of Achilles if people did not know the role he played in the Trojan war. With this tale complete Bacchylides proclaims once again that the actions he has just told will be forever remembered thanks to the muses, leading once again into his praise of Pytheas and his trainer Menander, who shall be remembered for their great victories in the Pan-Hellenic games, even if an envious rival slights them.

=== Ode 15 ===
The Sons of Antenor, or Helen Demanded Back, is the first of Bacchylides’s dithyrambs in the text restored in 1896. The opening is incomplete, as part of the papyrus was damaged. The dithyramb treats a moment in myth before the Trojan war, when Menelaus, Antenor, and Antenor’s sons go to King Priam to demand the return of Helen. As is often the case with ancient Greek literature, Bacchylides plays of the audience’s knowledge of Homer without repeating a scene told by Homer. He instead describes a scene which is new to the audience, but which is given context by knowledge of the Iliad and Odyssey. The story of this embassy was known to Homer, who merely alludes to it at Iliad 3.205ff., but it was fully related in the cyclic epic poem Cypria, according to the Chrestomathy of Proclus.

The style also plays off of Homer. Characters are almost always named with their fathers, i.e. Odysseus, son of Laertes (as reconstructed). They are also given epithets, though these are not the traditional Homeric epithets: godly Antenor, upright Justice, reckless Outrage.
