= Epinikion =

Genre of poetry

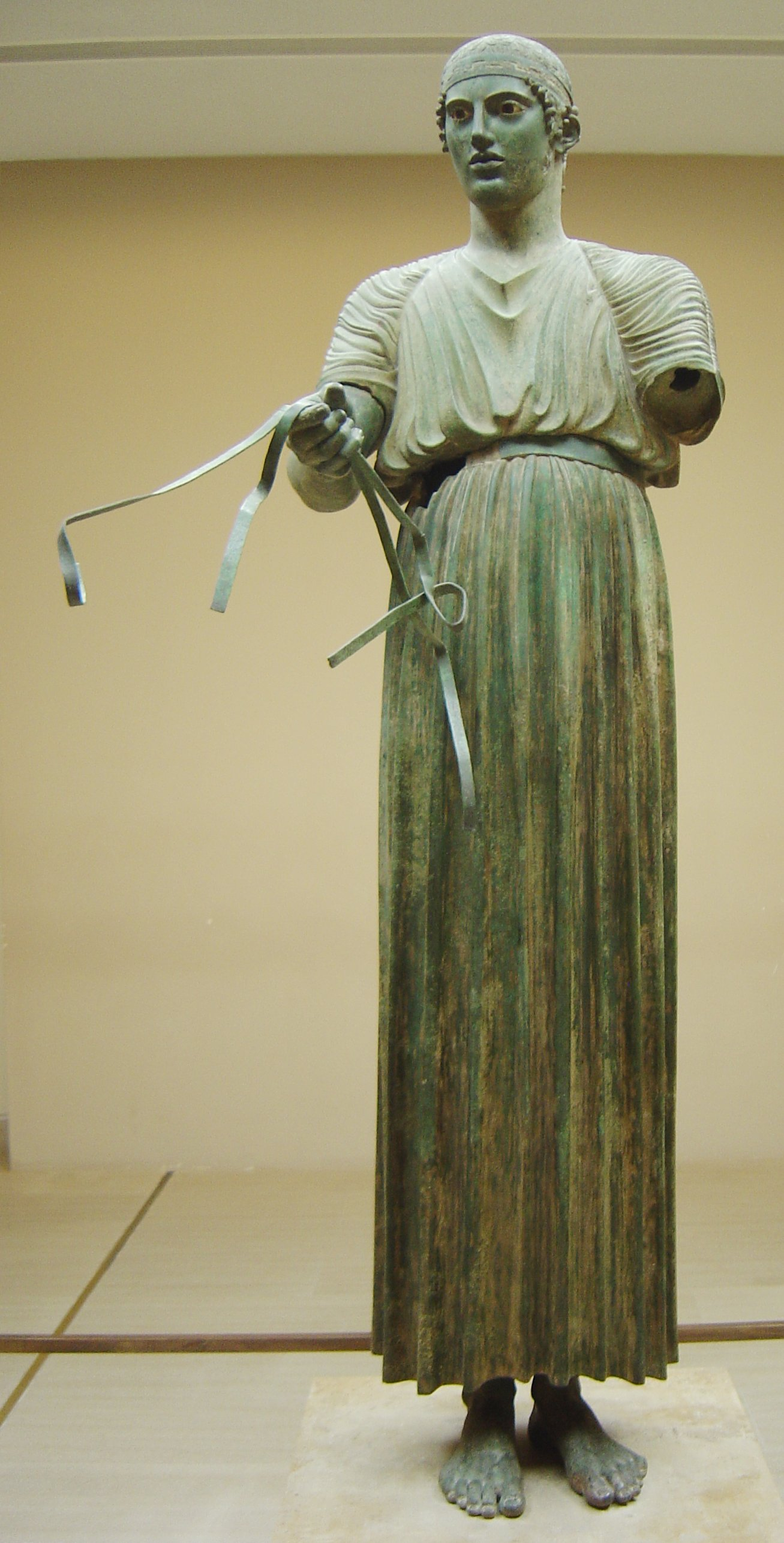
In addition to epinikia, a victorious athlete might be honored with a statue, as with this charioteer found at Delphi, probably a champion driver at the Pythian Games

The epinikion or epinicion (pl.: epinikia or epinicia, Greek ἐπινίκιον, from epi-, "on" and nikê, "victory") is a genre of occasional poetry also known in English as a victory ode. In ancient Greece, the epinikion most often took the form of a choral lyric, commissioned for and performed at the celebration of an athletic victory in the Panhellenic Games and sometimes in honor of a victory in war. Major poets in the genre are Simonides, Bacchylides, and Pindar.

== Origins ==
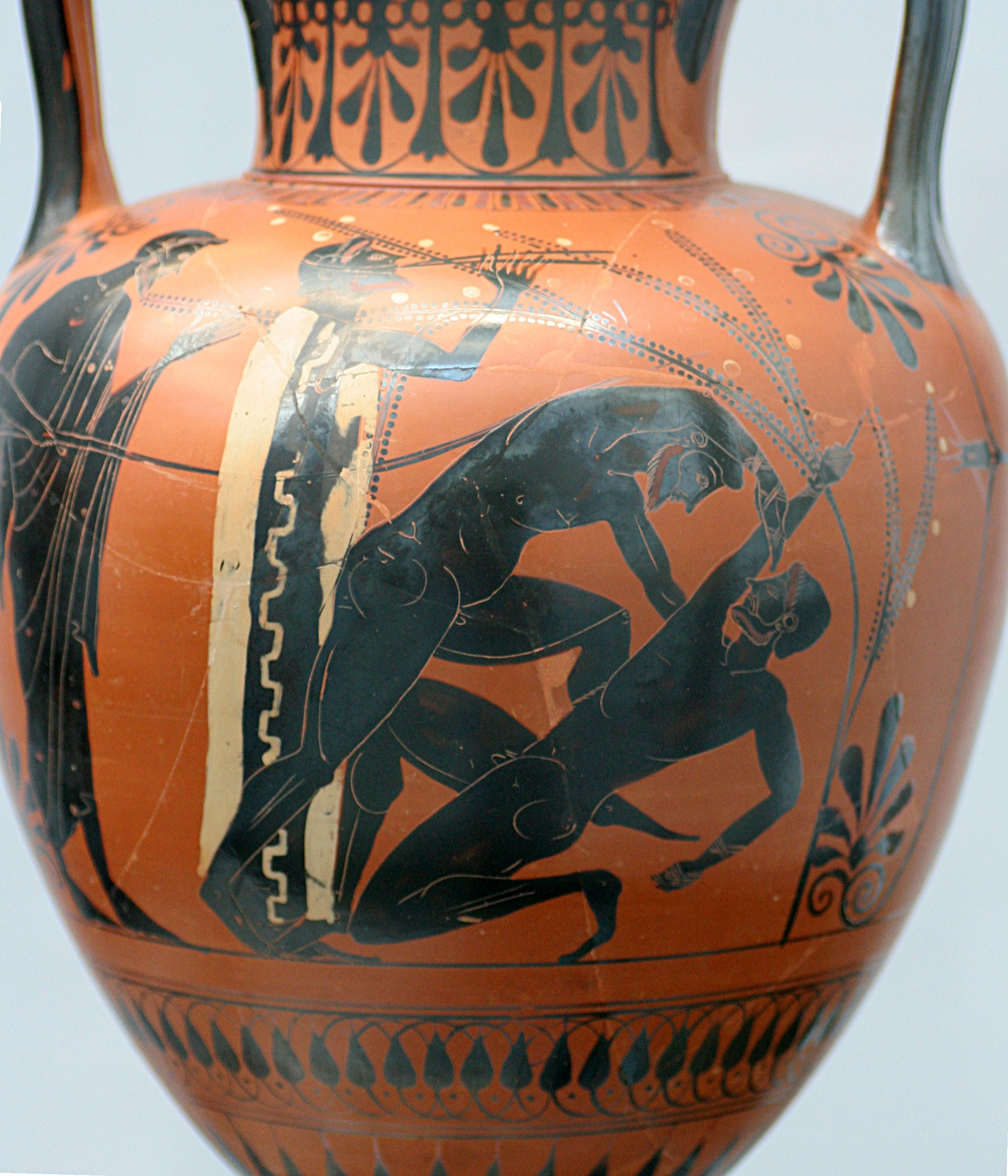
An aulist plays music in the background of a boxing match (Attic vase, 510–500 BC)

Since the poets most often call their victory songs hymnoi (ὕμνοι), it has been conjectured that hymns for Heracles, honored as the founder of the Olympic Games, were the original model for the athletic epinikion. Victory odes are also associated with the Dioscuri; Pindar uses the term "Castor-song" (Καστόρειον), and Polydeuces (Pollux), the mortal twin of Castor, was a boxer.

Although the best-known epinikia appear to have been composed for a chorus, they may have originally been performed by a soloist. Pindar says that a lyric by Archilochus was sung at Olympia, and a scholiast to the passage gives a quotation. The performance of these songs seems to have led in the 6th century BC to aristocratic commissions for more elaborate numbers.

The earliest epinikia, surviving only in fragments, were composed by Simonides of Ceos in the 520s BC. Simonides was the first professional poet known to write odes in honor of victorious athletes at the games; in antiquity, he was also notorious for being the first poet to charge a fee for his services. The epinikia of Bacchylides were formerly considered lost and were known only from quotations in other authors, until the discovery in the late 19th century of a papyrus manuscript containing fifteen of his odes. Pindar's four surviving books of epinikia, called one of "the great monuments of Greek lyric", correspond to each of the four major festivals of the Panhellenic Games: Olympian, Pythian, Isthmian, and Nemean. Many of Pindar's odes can be identified by event, champion, and year.

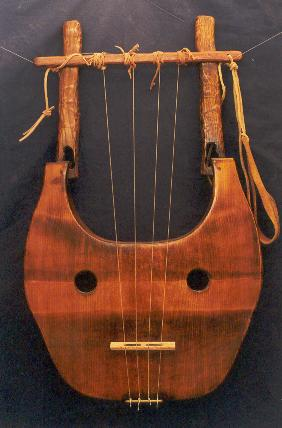
A phorminx

== Occasion and performance ==
The epinikion was performed not at the games, but at the celebration surrounding the champion's return to his hometown or perhaps at the anniversary of his victory. The odes celebrate runners, pentathletes, wrestlers, boxers, and charioteers; Pindar usually narrates or alludes elaborately to a myth connected to the victor's family or birthplace. The Pindaric ode has a metrical structure rivaled in its complexity only by the chorus of Greek tragedy, and is usually composed in a triadic form comprising strophe, antistrophe, and epode. The odes were performed by a chorus that sang and danced to the musical accompaniment of the phorminx or aulos.

== The epinikion and society ==
"The victory ode", notes Mary Lefkowitz, "is a curious and somewhat paradoxical form of art". Simon Goldhill has described the epinikion as practiced by Pindar as "a performance hired to mark the place of an individual within his city". The epinikion praised the victorious athlete as an ideal representative of the community and of the aristocratic class, linking his achievements with those of local cult heroes. But the athlete was also admonished against hubris, "not to seek to become Zeus".

A later contributor to the genre was Callimachus.

== Selected bibliography ==
- Mathiesen, Thomas J. "Epinikion and encomium". In Apollo's Lyre: Greek Music and Music Theory in Antiquity and the Middle Ages. University of Nebraska Press, 2000, pp. 135–141 online.
- Robbins, Emmet. "Public Poetry". In A Companion to the Greek Lyric Poets. Edited by Douglas E. Gerber. Brill, 1997. Limited preview online.
- Kurke, Leslie. "The Strangeness of 'Song Culture': Archaic Greek Poetry". In Literature in the Greek World. Edited by Oliver Taplin. Oxford University Press, 2001. Limited preview online.
- Neumann-Hartmann, Arlette. Epinikien und ihr Aufführungsrahmen. Hildesheim, Weidmann, 2009 (Nikephoros. Beihefte, 17).
