= Agia Marina, Kea =

Agia Marina Αγία Μαρίνα
- Settlement
- Location within Greece
- Coordinates: 37°36′57″N 24°18′3″E
- Country: Greece
- Administrative region: South Aegean
- Regional unit: Kea-Kythnos
- Municipality: Kea
- Community: Ioulis

Population (2021)
  - Total: 13
- Time zone: UTC+2 (EET)
  - Summer (DST): UTC+3 (EEST)

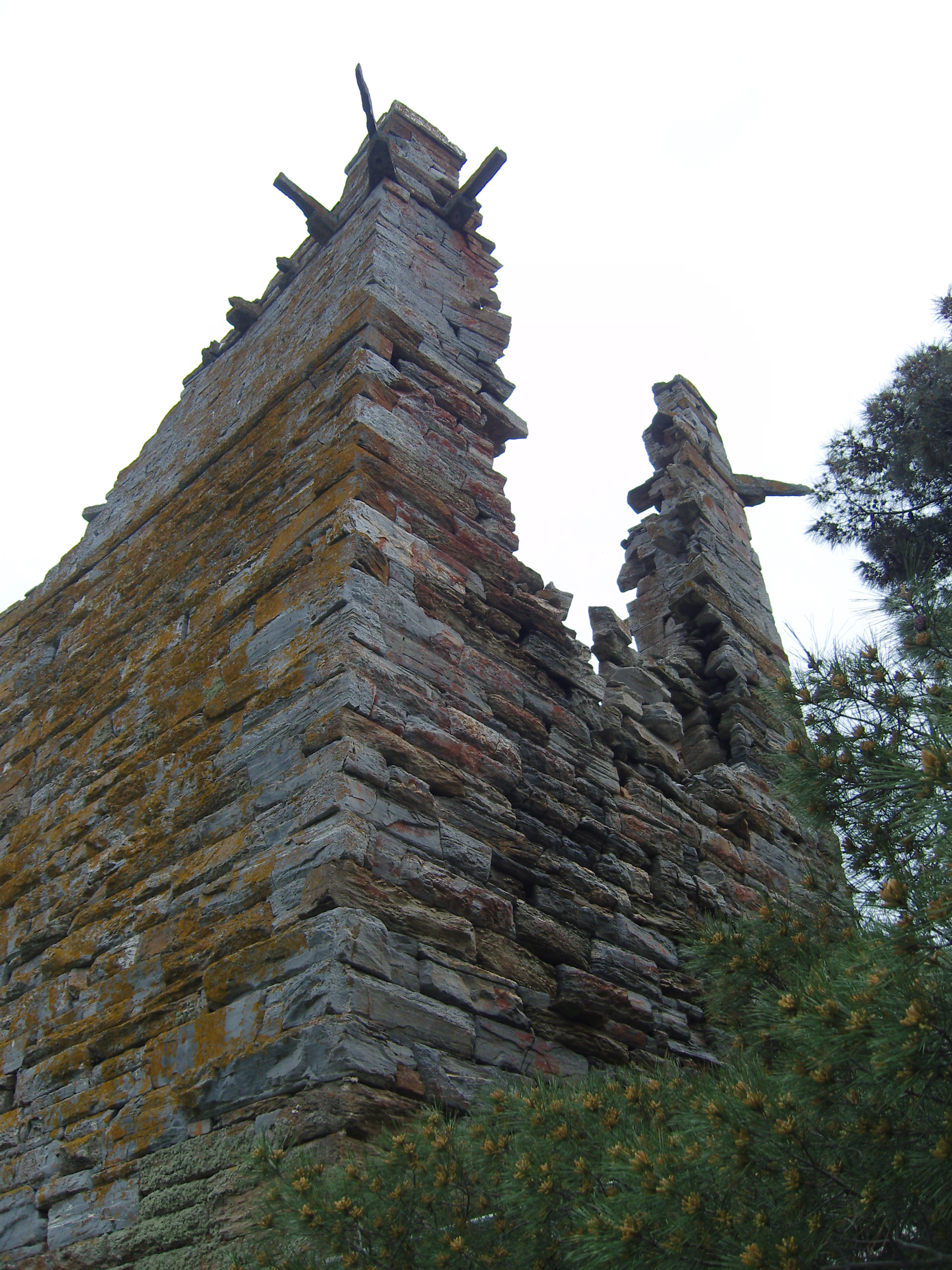
Hellenistic tower of Agia Marina, on Kea island

Agia Marina (Greek: Αγία Μαρίνα) is a village in the municipality of Kea in the regional unit of Kea-Kythnos.
