= Coressia =

Korissia Κορησσία
- Community
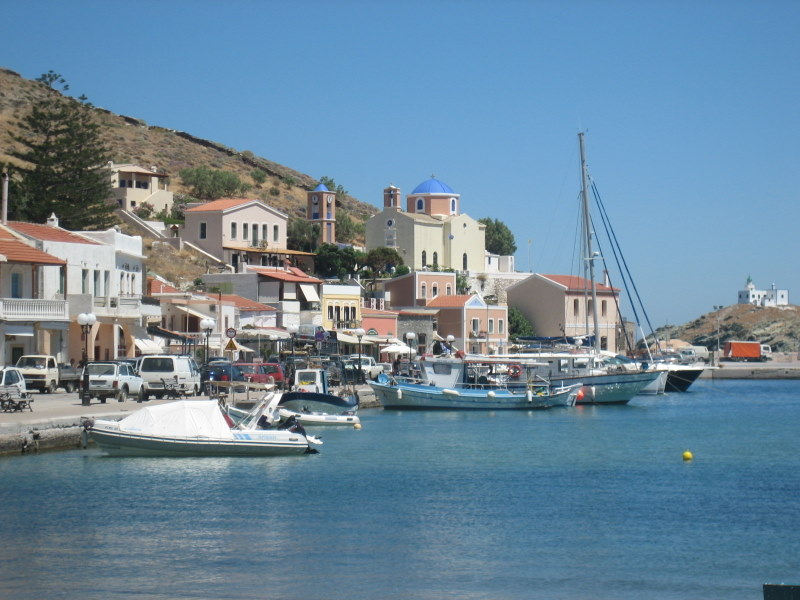

- Location within Greece
- Coordinates: 37°39′31″N 24°18′40″E
- Country: Greece
- Administrative region: South Aegean
- Regional unit: Kea-Kythnos
- Municipality: Kea

Population (2021)
  - Community: 1,110
- Time zone: UTC+2 (EET)
  - Summer (DST): UTC+3 (EEST)

Coressia or Korissia (Ancient Greek: Κορησσία), also spelt Coresia or Koresia (Κορησία), also known as Coressus and Arsinoe (Ἀρσινόη), was a town of Ceos, and functioned as the harbour of Iulis. Near it was a temple of Apollo Smintheus, and the small stream Elixus flowed by it into the sea. There are a very few remains of the town on the heights upon the west side of the bay. The harbour is large and commodious.

The site of Coressia is located near modern Livadi, which was renamed to Korisia in 1922.
