= Ceos (mythology) =

In Greek mythology, Ceos (Ancient Greek: Κέω) was the eponym of island Keos. He was the son of Apollo and the nymph Rhodoessa.
