= Simonides of Ceos =

Greek lyric poet (c. 556–468 BC)

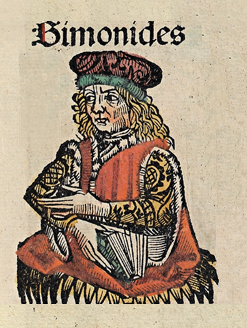
Imaginary portrait of Simonides from the Nuremberg Chronicle (1493)

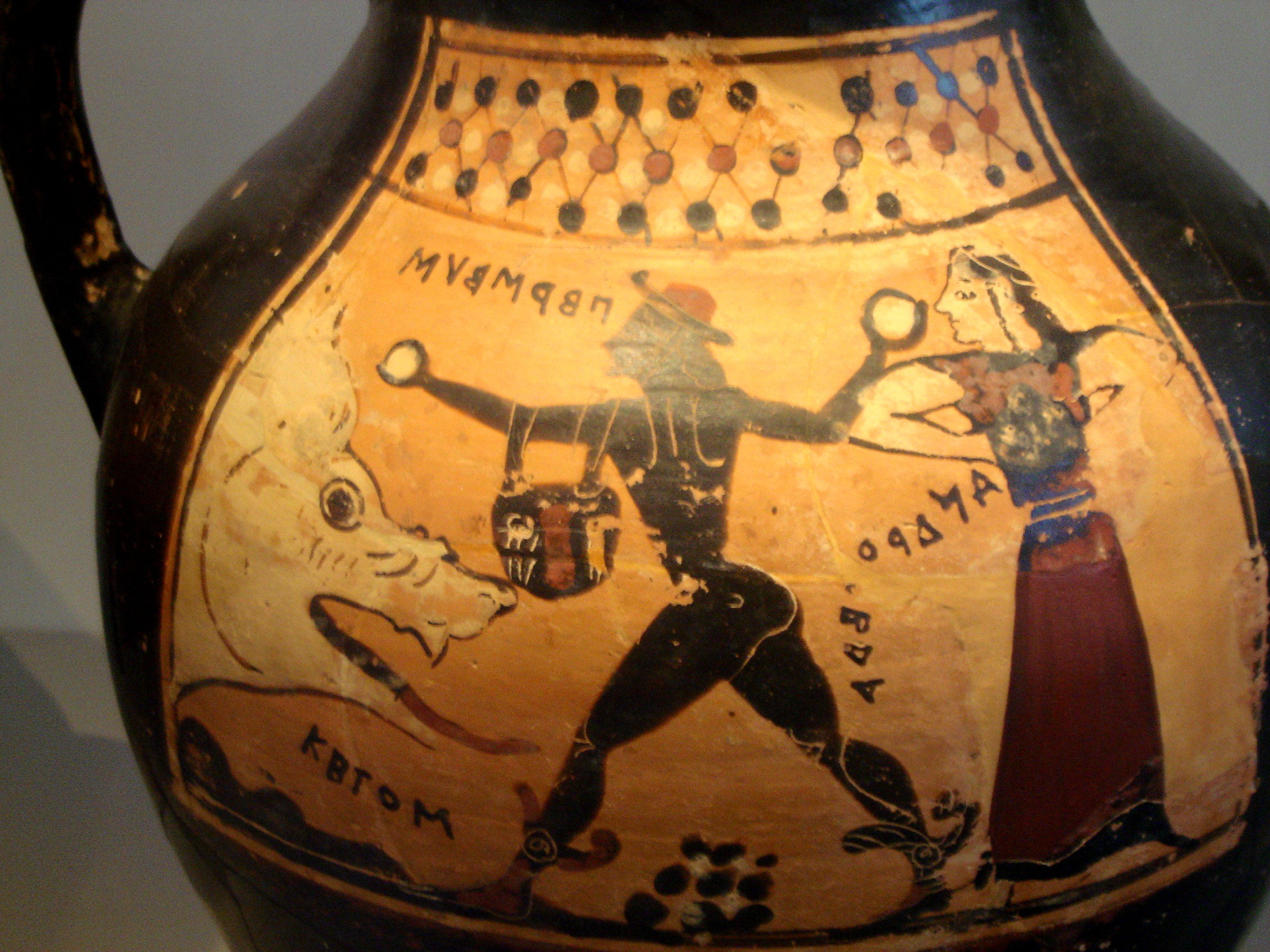
Corinthian vase depicting Perseus, Andromeda and Ketos; the names are written in the archaic Greek alphabet.

Simonides of Ceos (/saɪˈmɒnɪˌdiːz/; Ancient Greek: Σιμωνίδης ὁ Κεῖος; c. 556 – 468 BC) was a Greek lyric poet, born in Ioulis on Ceos. The scholars of Hellenistic Alexandria included him in the canonical list of the nine lyric poets esteemed by them as worthy of critical study. Included on this list were Bacchylides, his nephew, and Pindar, reputedly a bitter rival, both of whom benefited from his innovative approach to lyric poetry. Simonides, however, was more involved than either in the major events and with the personalities of their times.

Lessing, writing in the Enlightenment era, referred to him as "the Greek Voltaire". His general renown owes much to traditional accounts of his colourful life, as one of the wisest of men; as a greedy miser; as an inventor of a system of mnemonics; and the inventor of some letters of the Greek alphabet (ω, η, ξ, ψ). Such accounts include fanciful elements, yet he had a real influence on the sophistic enlightenment of the Classical era. His fame as a poet rests largely on his ability to present basic human situations with affecting simplicity. In the words of the Roman rhetorician Quintilian (35–100 AD):

Simonides has a simple style, but he can be commended for the aptness of his language and for a certain charm; his chief merit, however, lies in the power to excite pity, so much so that some prefer him in this respect to all other writers of the genre.

He is popularly associated with epitaphs commemorating fallen warriors, as for example the Lacedaemonians at the Battle of Thermopylae:

Ὦ ξεῖν', ἀγγέλλειν Λακεδαιμονίοις ὅτι τῇδε
κείμεθα, τοῖς κείνων ῥήμασι πειθόμενοι.

Translation:

Tell them in Lacedaemon, passer-by
That here, obedient to their word, we lie,

— Translated by F. L. Lucas
as an English heroic couplet

Today only glimpses of his poetry remain, either in the form of papyrus fragments or quotations by ancient literary figures, yet new fragments continue to be unearthed by archaeologists at Oxyrhynchus, a city and archaeological site in Egypt that has yielded papyrus fragments from over a century of excavations. He is included in narratives as diverse as Mary Renault's modern historical novel The Praise Singer (where he is the narrator and main character), Plato's Protagoras (where he is a topic of conversation), and some verses in Callimachus' Aetia (where he is portrayed as a ghost complaining about the desecration of his own tomb in Acragas).

== Biography ==
Few clear facts about Simonides' life have come down to modern times in spite of his fame and influence. Ancient sources are uncertain even about the date of his birth. According to the Byzantine encyclopaedia, Suda: "He was born in the 56th Olympiad (556/552 BC) or according to some writers in the 62nd (532/528 BC) and he survived until the 78th (468/464 BC), having lived eighty-nine years." Simonides was popularly accredited with the invention of four letters of the revised alphabet and, as the author of inscriptions, he was the first major poet who composed verses to be read rather than recited. Coincidentally he also composed a dithyramb on the subject of Perseus that is now one of the largest fragments of his extant verses.

Modern scholars generally accept 556–468 BC as the span of his life in spite of some awkward consequences—for example it would make him about fifty years older than his nephew Bacchylides and still very active internationally at about 80 years of age. Other ancient sources also have awkward consequences. For example, according to an entry in the Parian Marble, Simonides died in 468/467 BC at the age of ninety yet, in another entry, it lists a victory by his grandfather in a poetry competition in Athens in 489/488 BC — this grandfather must have been over a hundred years old at that time if the birth dates for Simonides are correct. The grandfather's name, as recorded by the Parian Marble, was also Simonides, and it has been argued by some scholars that the earliest references to Simonides in ancient sources might in fact be references to this grandfather. However, the Parian Marble is known to be unreliable and possibly it was not even the grandfather but a grandson that won the aforementioned victory in Athens. According to the Suda, this grandson was yet another Simonides and he was the author of books on genealogy.

=== Early years: Ceos and Athens ===
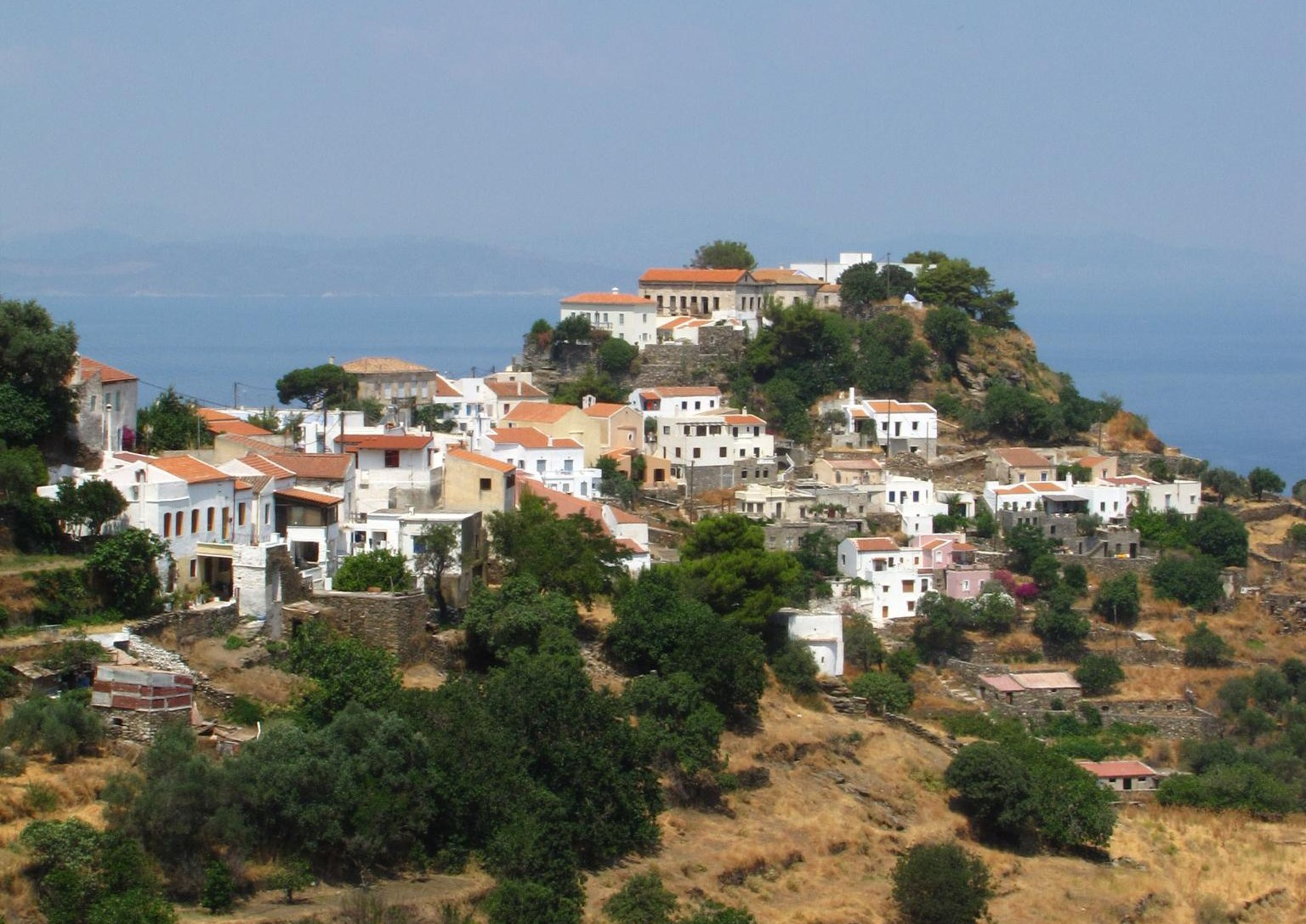
Ioulis, present-day capital of Kea (Ceos in Ancient Greek), including remnants of the ancient acropolis. Like most Cycladic settlements, it was built inland on a readily defensible hill as protection against pirates

Simonides was the son of Leoprepes, and the grandson or descendant of Hylichus. He was born in Ioulis on Ceos (Ἰουλίς, Κέως), the outermost island of the Cyclades. The innermost island, Delos, was the reputed birthplace of Apollo, where the people of Ceos regularly sent choirs to perform hymns in the god's honour. Carthaea, another Cean town, included a choregeion or school where choirs were trained, and possibly Simonides worked there as a teacher in his early years.

In addition to its musical culture, Ceos had a rich tradition of athletic competition, especially in running and boxing (the names of Ceans victorious at Panhellenic competitions were recorded at Ioulis on slabs of stone) making it fertile territory for a genre of choral lyric that Simonides pioneered—the victory ode. Indeed, the grandfather of Simonides' nephew, Bacchylides, was one of the island's notable athletes.

Ceos lies only some fifteen miles south-east of Attica, whither Simonides was drawn, about the age of thirty, by the lure of opportunities opening up at the court of the tyrant Hipparchus, a patron of the arts. His rivalry there with another chorus-trainer and poet, Lasus of Hermione, became something of a joke to Athenians of a later generation—it is mentioned briefly by the comic playwright Aristophanes who earmarked Simonides as a miserly type of professional poet (see The Miser below)

=== Middle career: Thessaly ===
After the assassination of Hipparchus (514 BC), Simonides withdrew to Thessaly, where he enjoyed the protection and patronage of the Scopadae and Aleuadae. These were two of the most powerful families in the Thessalian feudal aristocracy yet they seemed notable to later Greeks such as Theocritus only for their association with Simonides. Thessaly at that time was perceived as a cultural backwater by other Greeks. According to an account by Plutarch, the Ionian poet once dismissed the Thessalians as "too ignorant" to be beguiled by poetry.

Among the most colourful of his "ignorant" patrons was the head of the Scopadae clan, named Scopas. Fond of drinking, convivial company and vain displays of wealth, this aristocrat's proud and capricious dealings with Simonides are demonstrated in a traditional account related by Cicero and Quintilian, according to which the poet was commissioned to write a victory ode for a boxer. Simonides embellished his ode with so many references to the twins Castor and Pollux (heroic archetypes of the boxer) that Scopas told him to collect half the commissioned fee from them — he would only pay the other half. Simonides however ended up getting much more from the mythical twins than just a fee; he owed them his very life (see Miraculous escapes). According to this story he was called out of the feast hall to see two visitors who had arrived and were asking for him – presumably Castor and Pollux. As soon as he left the hall, it collapsed, killing everyone within. These events were said to have inspired him to develop a system of mnemonics based on images and places called the method of loci. The method of loci is one component of the art of memory.

=== Career highlight: Persian Wars ===
The Thessalian period in Simonides' career is followed in most biographies by his return to Athens during the Persian Wars and it is certain that he became a prominent international figure at that time, particularly as the author of commemorative verses. According to an anonymous biographer of Aeschylus, the Athenians chose Simonides ahead of Aeschylus to be the author of an epigram honouring their war-dead at Marathon, which led the tragedian (who had fought at the battle and whose brother had died there) to withdraw sulking to the court of Hieron of Syracuse — the story is probably based on the inventions of comic dramatists but it is likely that Simonides did in fact write some kind of commemorative verses for the Athenian victory at Marathon.

His ability to compose tastefully and poignantly on military themes put him in great demand among Greek states after their defeat of the second Persian invasion, when he is known to have composed epitaphs for Athenians, Spartans and Corinthians, a commemorative song for Leonidas and his men, a dedicatory epigram for Pausanias, and poems on the battles of Artemisium, Salamis, and Plataea.

According to Plutarch, the Cean had a statue of himself made about this time, which inspired the Athenian politician Themistocles to comment on his ugliness. In the same account, Themistocles is said to have rejected an attempt by the poet to bribe him, then likened himself as an honest magistrate to a good poet, since an honest magistrate keeps the laws and a good poet keeps in tune. Suda mentions a feud between Simonides and the Rhodian lyric poet, Timocreon, for whom Simonides apparently composed a mock epitaph that touches on the issue of the Rhodian's medism—an issue that also involved Themistocles.

=== Final years: Sicily ===
The last years of the poet's life were spent in Sicily, where he became a friend and confidant of Hieron of Syracuse. According to a scholiast on Pindar, he once acted as peace-maker between Hieron and another Sicilian tyrant, Theron of Acragas, thus ending a war between them. Scholiasts are the only authority for stories about the rivalry between Simonides and Pindar at the court of Hieron, traditionally used to explain some of the meanings in Pindar's victory odes (see the articles on Bacchylides and Pindar). If the stories of rivalry are true, it may be surmised that Simonides's experiences at the courts of the tyrants, Hipparchus and Scopas, gave him a competitive edge over the proud Pindar and enabled him to promote the career of his nephew, Bacchylides, at Pindar's expense. However, Pindar scholiasts are generally considered unreliable, and there is no reason to accept their account. The Hellenistic poet Callimachus revealed in one of his poems that Simonides was buried outside Acragas, and that his tombstone was later misused in the construction of a tower.

=== Biographical themes ===
Traditional accounts of the poet's life embody a variety of themes.

==== Miraculous escapes ====
As mentioned above, both Cicero and Quintilian are sources for the story that Scopas, the Thessalian nobleman, refused to pay Simonides in full for a victory ode that featured too many decorative references to the mythical twins, Castor and Pollux. According to the rest of the story, Simonides was celebrating the same victory with Scopas and his relatives at a banquet when he received word that two young men were waiting outside to see him. When he got outside, however, he discovered firstly that the two young men were nowhere to be found and, secondly, that the dining hall was collapsing behind him. Scopas and a number of his relatives were killed. Apparently the two young men were the twins and they had rewarded the poet's interest in them by thus saving his life. Simonides later benefited from the tragedy by deriving a system of mnemonics from it (see The inventor). Quintilian dismisses the story as a fiction because "the poet nowhere mentions the affair, although he was not in the least likely to keep silent on a matter which brought him such glory ..." This however was not the only miraculous escape that his piety afforded him.

There are two epigrams in the Palatine Anthology, both attributed to Simonides and both dedicated to a drowned man whose corpse the poet and some companions are said to have found and buried on an island. The first is an epitaph in which the dead man is imagined to invoke blessings on those who had buried the body, and the second records the poet's gratitude to the drowned man for having saved his own life – Simonides had been warned by his ghost not to set sail from the island with his companions, who all subsequently drowned.

==== The inventor ====
During the excavation of the rubble of Scopas's dining hall, Simonides was called upon to identify each guest killed. Their bodies had been crushed beyond recognition but he completed the gruesome task by correlating their identities to their positions (loci in Latin) at the table before his departure. He later drew on this experience to develop the 'memory theatre' or 'memory palace', a system for mnemonics widely used in oral societies until the Renaissance. According to Cicero, Themistocles wasn't much impressed with the poet's invention: "I would rather a technique of forgetting, for I remember what I would rather not remember and cannot forget what I would rather forget."

The Suda credits Simonides with inventing "the third note of the lyre" (which is known to be wrong since the lyre had seven strings from the 7th century BC), and four letters of the Greek alphabet. Whatever the validity of such claims, a creative and original turn of mind is demonstrated in his poetry as he likely invented the genre of the victory ode and he gave persuasive expression to a new set of ethical standards (see Ethics).

==== The miser ====
In his play Peace, Aristophanes imagined that the tragic poet Sophocles had turned into Simonides: "He may be old and decayed, but these days, if you paid him enough, he'd go to sea in a sieve." A scholiast, commenting on the passage, wrote: "Simonides seems to have been the first to introduce money-grabbing into his songs and to write a song for pay" and, as proof of it, quoted a passage from one of Pindar's odes ("For then the Muse was not yet fond of profit nor mercenary"), which he interpreted as covert criticism of Simonides. The same scholiast related a popular story that the poet kept two boxes, one empty and the other full – the empty one being where he kept favours, the full one being where he kept his money. According to Athenaeus, when Simonides was at Hieron's court in Syracuse, he used to sell most of the daily provisions that he received from the tyrant, justifying himself thus: "So that all may see Hieron's magnificence and my moderation." Aristotle reported that the wife of Hieron once asked Simonides whether it was better to be wealthy or wise, to which he apparently replied: "Wealthy; for I see the wise spending their days at the doors of the wealthy."

According to an anecdote recorded on a papyrus, dating to around 250 BC, Hieron once asked the poet if everything grows old: "Yes," Simonides answered, "all except money-making; and kind deeds age most quickly of all." He once rejected a small fee to compose a victory ode for the winner of a mule race (it was not a prestigious event) but, according to Aristotle, changed his mind when the fee was increased, resulting in this magniloquent opening: "Greetings, daughters of storm-footed steeds!" In a quote recorded by Plutarch, he once complained that old age had robbed him of every pleasure but making money.

All these amusing anecdotes might simply reflect the fact that he was the first poet to charge fees for his services – generosity is glimpsed in his payment for an inscription on a friend's epitaph, as recorded by Herodotus. Herodotus also mentions an earlier poet Arion, who had amassed a fortune on a visit to Italy and Sicily, so maybe Simonides was not the first professional poet, as claimed by the Greeks themselves.

==== The sage and wit ====
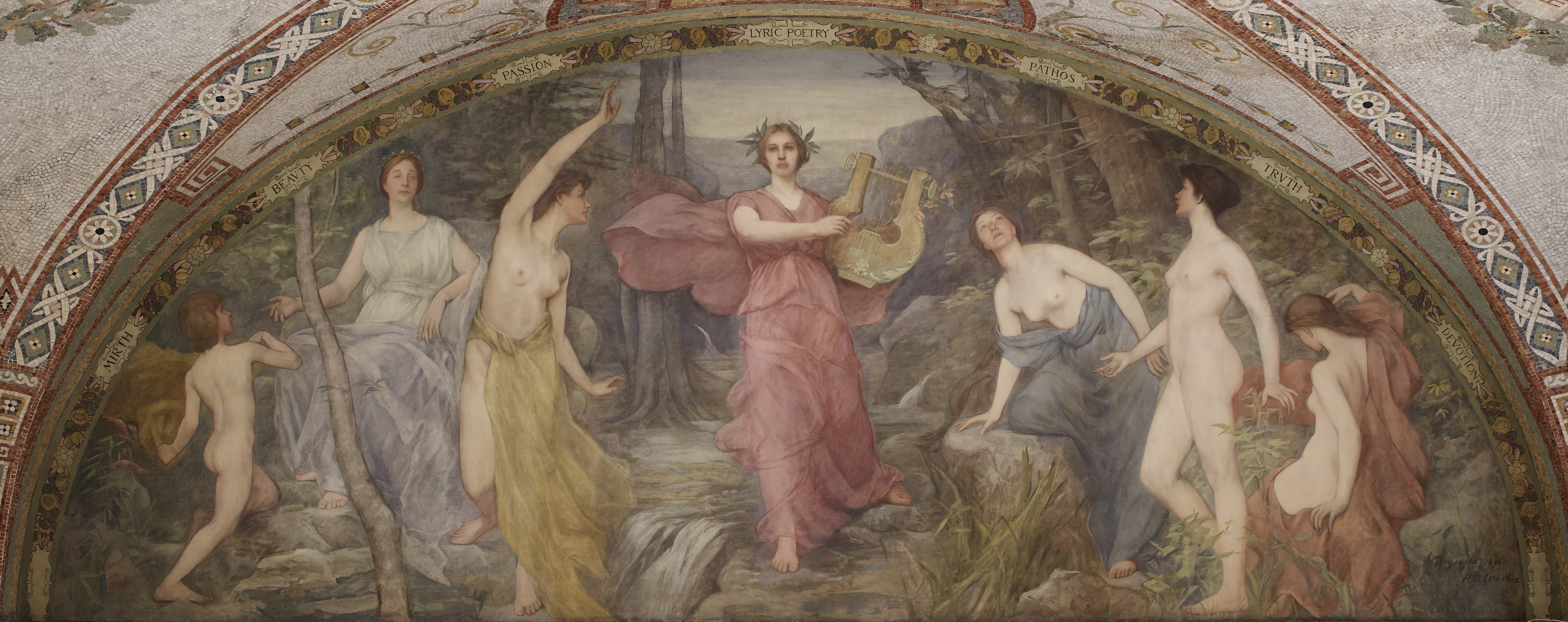
Lyric Poetry, painted by Henry Oliver Walker (Thomas Jefferson Building, Washington D.C.). "Simonides calls painting silent poetry and poetry painting that speaks" — Plutarch.

Plato, in The Republic, numbered Simonides with Bias and Pittacus among the wise and blessed, even putting into the mouth of Socrates the words "it is not easy to disbelieve Simonides, for he is a wise man and divinely inspired," but in his dialogue Protagoras, Plato numbered Simonides with Homer and Hesiod as precursors of the sophist. A number of apocryphal sayings were attributed to him.

Michael Psellos accredited him with "the word is the image of the thing." Plutarch commended "the saying of Simonides, that he had often felt sorry after speaking but never after keeping silent" and observed that "Simonides calls painting silent poetry and poetry painting that speaks" (later paraphrased by the Latin poet Horace as ut pictura poesis).

Diogenes Laërtius, after quoting a famous epigram by Cleobulus (one of ancient Greece's 'seven sages') in which a maiden sculptured on a tomb is imagined to proclaim her eternal vigilance, quotes Simonides commenting on it in a poem of his own: "Stone is broken even by mortal hands. That was the judgement of a fool." His rationalist view of the cosmos is evinced also in Plutarch's letter of consolation to Apollonius: "according to Simonides a thousand or ten thousand years are an indeterminable point, or rather the tiniest part of a point."

Cicero related how, when Hieron of Syracuse asked him to define god, Simonides continually postponed his reply, "because the longer I deliberate, the more obscure the matter seems to me." Stobaeus recorded this reply to a man who had confided in Simonides some unflattering things he had heard said about him: "Please stop slandering me with your ears!".

== Poetry ==
Simonides composed verses almost entirely for public performances and inscriptions, unlike previous lyric poets such as Sappho and Alcaeus, who composed more intimate verses to entertain friends—"With Simonides the age of individualism in lyric poetry has passed." Or so it seemed to modern scholars until the recent discovery of papyrus P.Oxy. 3965 in which Simonides is glimpsed in a sympotic context, speaking for example as an old man rejuvenated in the company of his homo-erotic lover, couched on a bed of flowers. Some of the short passages identified by ancient or modern authors as epigrams may also have been performed at symposia. Very little of his poetry survives today but enough is recorded on papyrus fragments and in quotes by ancient commentators for many conclusions to be drawn at least tentatively (nobody knows if and when the sands of Egypt will reveal further discoveries).

Simonides wrote a wide range of choral lyrics with an Ionian flavour and elegiac verses in Doric idioms. He is generally credited with inventing a new type of choral lyric, the encomium, in particular popularising a form of it, the victory ode. These were extensions of the hymn, which previous generations of poets had dedicated only to gods and heroes:

But it was Simonides who first led the Greeks to feel that such a tribute might be paid to any man who was sufficiently eminent in merit or in station. We must remember that, in the time of Simonides, the man to whom a hymn was addressed would feel that he was receiving a distinction which had hitherto been reserved for gods and heroes. —

— R.C. Jebb (1905)

In one victory ode, celebrating Glaucus of Carystus, a famous boxer, Simonides declares that not even Heracles or Polydeuces could have stood against him—a statement whose impiety seemed notable even to Lucian many generations later.

Simonides was the first to establish the choral dirge as a recognized form of lyric poetry, his aptitude for it being testified, for example, by Quintillian (see quote in the Introduction), Horace ("Ceae ... munera neniae"), Catullus ("maestius lacrimis Simonideis") and Dionysius of Halicarnassus, where he says:

Observe in Simonides his choice of words and his care in combining them; in addition—and here he is found to be better even than Pindar—observe how he expresses pity not by using the grand style but by appealing to the emotions.

Simonides was adept too at lively compositions suited to dancing (hyporchema), for which he is commended by Plutarch. He was highly successful in dithyrambic competitions according to an anonymous epigram dating from the Hellenistic period, which credited him with 57 victories, possibly in Athens. The dithyramb, a genre of lyrics traditionally sung to Dionysus, was later developed into narratives illustrating heroic myths; Simonides is the earliest poet known to have composed in this enlarged form (the geographer Strabo mentioned a dithyramb, Memnon, in which Simonides located the hero's tomb in Syria, indicating that he didn't compose only on legends of Dionysus.)

Simonides has long been known to have written epitaphs for those who died in the Persian Wars and this has resulted in many pithy verses being mis-attributed to him "... as wise saws to Confucius or musical anecdotes to Beecham." Modern scholars generally consider only one of the attributed epigrams to be unquestionably authentic (an inscription for the seer Megistius quoted by Herodotus), which places in doubt even some of the most famous examples, such as the one to the Spartans at Thermopylae, quoted in the introduction. He composed longer pieces on a Persian War theme, including Dirge for the Fallen at Thermopylae, Battle at Artemisium and Battle at Salamis but their genres are not clear from the fragmentary remains – the first was labelled by Diodorus Siculus as an encomium but it was probably a hymn and the second was characterised in the Suda as elegiac yet Priscian, in a comment on prosody, indicated that it was composed in lyric meter. Substantial fragments of a recently discovered poem, describing the run-up to the Battle of Plataea and comparing Pausanias to Achilles, show that he actually did compose narrative accounts in elegiac meter. Simonides also wrote Paeans and Prayers/Curses (κατευχαί) and possibly in some genres where no record of his work survives.

=== Poetic style ===
Like other lyric poets in late Archaic Greece, Simonides made notable use of compound adjectives and decorative epithets, yet he is also remarkable for his restraint and balance. His expression was clear and simple, relying on straightforward statement. An example is found in a quote by Stobaeus paraphrased here to suggest the original Aeolic verse rhythms, predominantly choriambic ( ¯˘˘¯, ¯˘˘¯ ), with some dactylic expansion (¯˘˘¯˘˘¯) and an iambic close (˘¯,˘¯):

Being a man you cannot tell what might befall when tomorrow comes
Nor yet how long one who appears blessed will remain that way,
So soon our fortunes change even the long-winged fly
Turns around less suddenly.

The only decorative word is 'long-winged' (τανυπτέρυγος), used to denote a dragonfly, and it emerges from the generalized meanings of the passage as an 'objective correlative' for the fragility of the human condition. The rhythm evokes the movement of the dragonfly and the mutability of human fortunes.

== Ethics ==
Simonides championed a tolerant, humanistic outlook that celebrated ordinary goodness, and recognized the immense pressures that life places on human beings. This attitude is evident in the following poem of Simonides (fr. 542), quoted in Plato's dialogue, the Protagoras, and reconstructed here according to a recent interpretation, making it the only lyric poem of Simonides that survives intact: (Note: ἄνδρ' ἀγαθὸν μὲν ἀλαθέως γενέσθαι χαλεπὸν, χερσίν τε καὶ ποσὶ καὶ νόωι τετράγωνον, ἄνευ ψόγου τετυγμένον· θεὸς ἂν μόνος τοῦτ' ἔχοι γέρας‧ ἄνδρα δ' οὐκ ἔστι μὴ οὐ κακὸν ἔμμεναι, ὃν ἀμήχανος συμφορὰ καθέληι· πράξας γὰρ εὖ πᾶς ἀνὴρ ἀγαθός, κακὸς δ' εἰ κακῶς, <οὓς δ' οἱ θεοὶ φιλέωσιν πλεῖστον, εἰσ' ἄριστοι.> οὐδ᾽ ἐμοὶ ἐμμελέως τὸ Πιττάκειον νέμεται, καίτοι σοφοῦ παρὰ φωτὸς εἰ- ρημένον· χαλεπὸν φάτ' ἐσθλὸν ἔμμεναι. <ἐμοὶ ἀρκέει> μητ' <ἐὼν> ἀπάλαμνος εἰ- δώς τ' ὀνησίπολιν δίκαν, ὑγιὴς ἀνήρ· οὐ<δὲ μή νιν> ἐγώ μωμήσομαι· τῶν γὰρ ἠλιθίων ἀπείρων γενέθλα. πάντα τοι καλά, τοῖσίν τ' αἰσχρὰ μὴ μέμεικται. τοὔνεκεν οὔ ποτ' ἐγὼ τὸ μὴ γενέσθαι δυνατὸν διζήμενος κενεὰν ἐς ἄ- πρακτον ἐλπίδα μοῖραν αἰῶνος βαλέω, πανάμωμον ἄνθρωπον, εὐρυεδέος ὅσοι καρπὸν αἰνύμεθα χθονός· ἐπὶ δ' ὔμμιν εὑρὼν ἀπαγγελέω. πάντας δ' ἐπαίνημι καὶ φιλέω, ἑκὼν ὅστις ἔρδηι μηδὲν αἰσχρόν· ἀνάγκαι δ' οὐδὲ θεοὶ μάχονται.)

For a man it's certainly hard to be truly good—perfect in hands, feet, and mind, built without a single flaw; only a god can have that prize; but a man, there's no way he can help being bad when some crisis that he cannot deal with takes him down. Any man's good when he's doing well in life, bad when he's doing badly, and the best of us are those the gods love most.

But for me that saying of Pittacus doesn't quite ring true (even though he was a smart man): he says "being good is hard": for me, a man's good enough as long as he's not too lawless, and has the sense of right that does cities good: a solid guy. I won't find fault with a man like that. After all, isn't there a limitless supply of fools? The way I see it, if there's no great shame in it, all's fair.

So I'm not going to throw away my dole of life on a vain, empty hope, searching for something there cannot be, a completely blameless man—at least not among us mortals who win our bread from the broad earth. (If I do find one, mind you, I'll be sure to let you know.) So long as he does nothing shameful willfully, I give my praise and love to any man. Not even the gods can fight necessity.
