= Rhodoessa =

Nymph in Greek mythology

In Greek mythology, Rhodoessa (Ancient Greek: Ῥοδόεσσα, romanized: Rhodoessa, lit. 'rose-coloured') is a nymph probably residing in the island of Keos. She consorted with the god Apollo and became the mother by him of Ceos, the eponymous hero of said island.
