= Vourkari =

Village in Kea, Greece

Coordinates: 37°40′N 24°19′E

Vourkari (Greek: Βουρκάρι) is a small village in the bay of Agios Nikolaos, in Kea, an island in the Greek Cyclades group. Its population is 109 (2021).It is the biggest and safest bay of the Cyclades. It is in front of the ancient prehistoric settlement of Agia Irini, which flourished during the Copper Era and was destroyed at its apex by an earthquake around 1500 BC.

Vourkari is very cosmopolitan during the summer, full of yachts, sailboats and speedboats. There are many restaurants, bars and coffee shops that are very crowded on weekends, as it is very near to Athens.
