= Poeeessa =

Coordinates: 37°35′47″N 24°16′31″E

Poeeessa, Poeëessa or Poieessa (Ποιήεσσα, Poiḗessa), or Poeessa, Poeëssa or Poiessa (Ποιῆσσα, Poiē̂ssa), or Poeassa or Poiassa (Ποιᾶσσα, Poiā̂ssa), was a town of ancient Keos, situated on the southwestern side of the island, on a high and steep promontory. It was founded in the 6th century BC. According to myths the Aeacus founded the city.

Its site is located near the modern Poisses.
