= Carthaea =

Coordinates: 37°33′41.4″N 24°19′50.6″E

Carthaea or Karthaia (Ancient Greek: Κάρθαια) was one of the four ancient Greek city-states on the island of Ceos (today Kea or Tzia) in the Cyclades. It was located on the southeastern coast of the island.

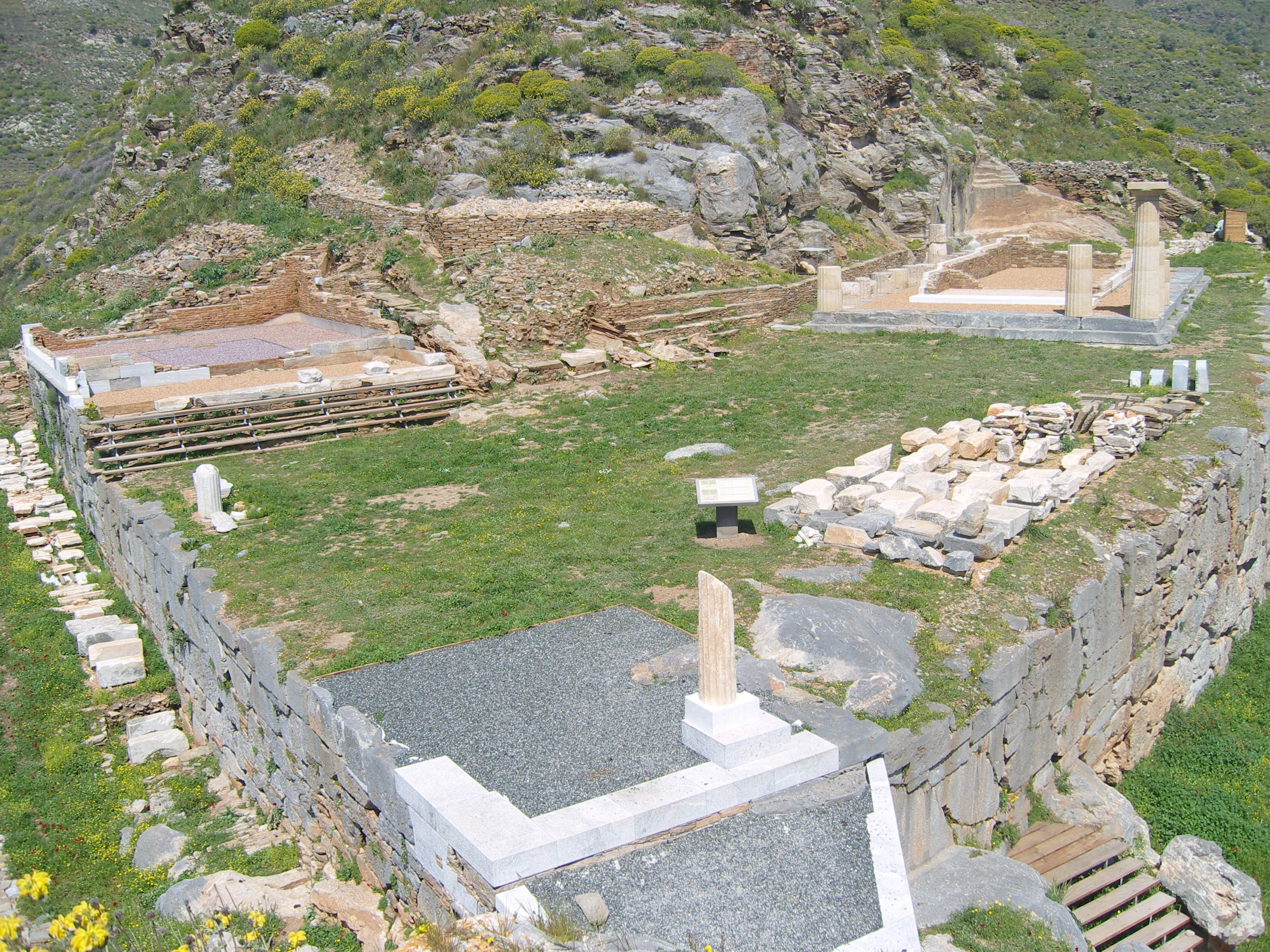

The site was inhabited continuously for c. 1,300 years, approximately from the 8th century BC (Geometric period) till the 6th century AD (Late Antiquity). From that time on Karthaia remained abandoned. The ruins of the acropolis, town-centre and fortifications of ancient Karthaia have been preserved for centuries on the Aspri Vigla hills, Pindar’s “narrow ridge of land“.

Two valleys, of the Kalamitsis on the east and the Vathypotamos on the west, and the sea on the south define the site completely, create a closed unit with a beautiful natural landscape, a refuge for important populations of various species of bird-life, and a place conducive to a variety of endemic pharmaceutical and aromatic plants.

Even today, Carthaea can be approached by land only on foot, walking for more or less an hour along cobbled paths, which in most cases follow the lines of ancient pathways, or by sea, by small boat, anchoring in the same place as the craft of previous periods, without the aid of modern harbour facilities.

== Description of the archaeological site ==
The acropolis of Carthaea is surrounded by walls more than 2 kilometers long and dated to the 6th-4th centuries BC. On its lowest part two artificial terraces were constructed in order to create the necessary space for temples and public buildings.

On the lower terrace, closer to the sea, there is the temple of Apollo Pythios dated to c. 530 BC. According to ancient texts it was the most important sacred building of the ancient city-state. On the terrace in front of the temple there were many dedications offered to the god, mainly statues, and the decrees of the Deme of Carthaea were put there on display.

On the upper terrace there is a smaller temple from c. 500 BC dedicated to Athena, according to some scholars. Marble architectural sculptures of this temple represented scenes of an Amazonomachy, scraps of which are kept in the Archaeological Museum of Ioulis.

A classical monumental marble building, a Propylon (mid-5th century BC) marked the main entrance to this terrace and to the acropolis. A sloping stone-paved way, dated to the first half of the 5th century BC, ascended to it from the west. On the eastern side an impressive Late Archaic flight of stairs partly carved in the bedrock led to a path (“processional way”) which connected the upper to the lower plateau.

On the upper terrace stood also another public building of uncertain function, which is called Building D (c. 300 BC). A monumental flight of six stairs led to a pronaos (porch) with four semi-fluted Doric columns “in antis”; the almost square cella was paved with a mosaic floor of white sea pebbles on the three sides of a central square with purple volcanic stones and a limestone cubic base.

At the foot of the slope to the Vathypotamos stream is located the stone-built theater of the ancient city, dated to the 4th century BC. It accommodated almost 1,000 people. The theater is currently under excavation and preservation works. Next to the theater an impressive complex of Roman baths have been uncovered lately.

Carthaea was a significant harbor of the Cyclades in ancient times. The submerged ancient jetty (c. 160 m in length and 35 m in width) is still discernible between the two bays; it was made of rocks, slabs and pebbles and reached to the small rocky islet of the bay.

At the top of the Aspri Vigla hill, where the modern church of the Theotokos of the Myrtles now stands, there was another ancient temple dedicated to an unknown deity. An Early Christian basilica lies in the bed of the Vathypotamos and is built with reused material from an ancient temple in the area, attributed to Demeter.

All over the slopes of the hill were constructed the private houses of the Carthaeans, of which many walls, thresholds, heaps of stones and minor objects (pottery and tools) bear witness. In several parts of the ancient city, e.g. south of the theater, east of the Apollo temple and along the way connecting the two terraces, there are remains of cisterns and pipes for the supply of water, dated to the Hellenistic until the Late Roman period.

The ancient cemetery is located outside the city-wall, in the valley of Kalamitsis. After the collapse of the ancient monuments, during the 6th and 7th centuries AD, numerous graves were dug within the ruins of the temple of Apollo, in the terrace of the temple of Athena, in the destroyed Building D and on the slope of Vathypotamos. These graves, often made by ancient architectural members in second use, are the testimony of the last inhabitants of Carthaea.

The territory (the chora) of the ancient city-state of Carthaea extended over the southeastern part of the island of Keos; all over this area vestiges of numerous ancient settlements, ruins of farm sheds, of towers and traces of metallurgical activity have been detected. A network of ancient roads, which were often at a later time taken over by the traditional paths of Kea, facilitated the transport and contact of the ancient citizens.

== Excavation and restoration ==
The fact that the ruins of Carthaea have always been visible, combined to the many references on the site in ancient texts compelled travellers to visit the area as early as the 17th century, but mostly in the 18th and 19th centuries. As no serious research had been conducted in the area till 1811, travellers identified the imposing ruins with Ioulis and situated Carthaea in the place of modern Chora, a frequent mistake marked also on maps of this period.

A milestone for the investigation of Carthaea is the year 1811, when the Danish scholar and archaeologist P.O. Brøndsted, guessing the importance of the site and seeking out ancient Greek artifacts, he excavated for two or three weeks with thirty local workers. The site was for the first time correctly identified with Carthaea, as the name was mentioned in ancient inscriptions found in situ. Scientific archaeological research on the ancient city started practically shortly after 1900, with the work of the Belgian archaeologist P. Graindor.

Excavation and restoration of the monuments of Carthaea was conducted by the Greek Ministry of Culture through the Committee for the “Conservation and Restoration of ancient Karthaia on Keos” in the years 2002-2008 and 2011-2015. The projects have been financed by the European Union. Work has been carried out on the temples of Apollo and Athena, on the Propylon, the Building D, the theater, and on their immediate surroundings.
