= Kea (island) =

Greek island in the Aegean Sea

Kea Κέα
- Municipality
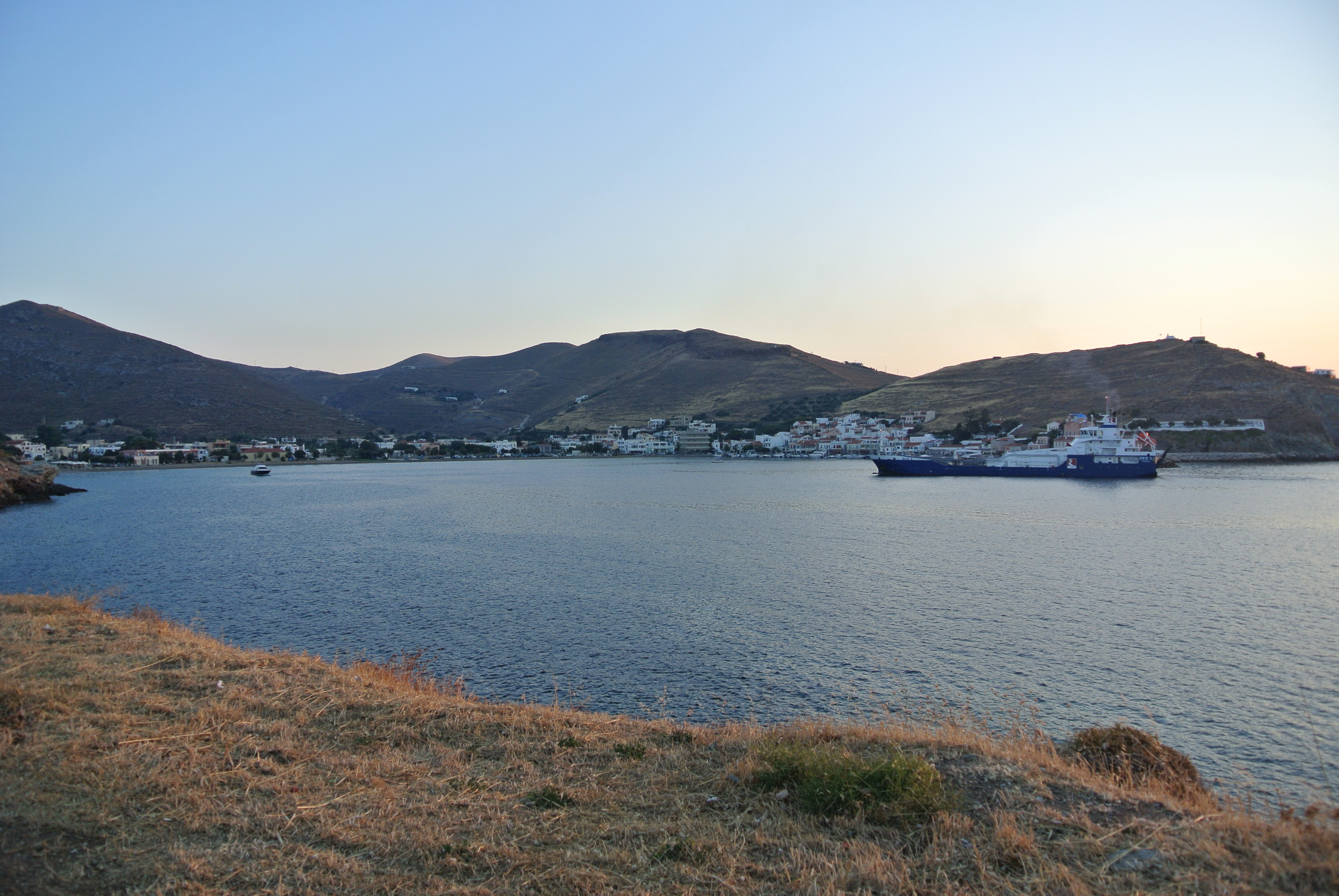
- Kea Island

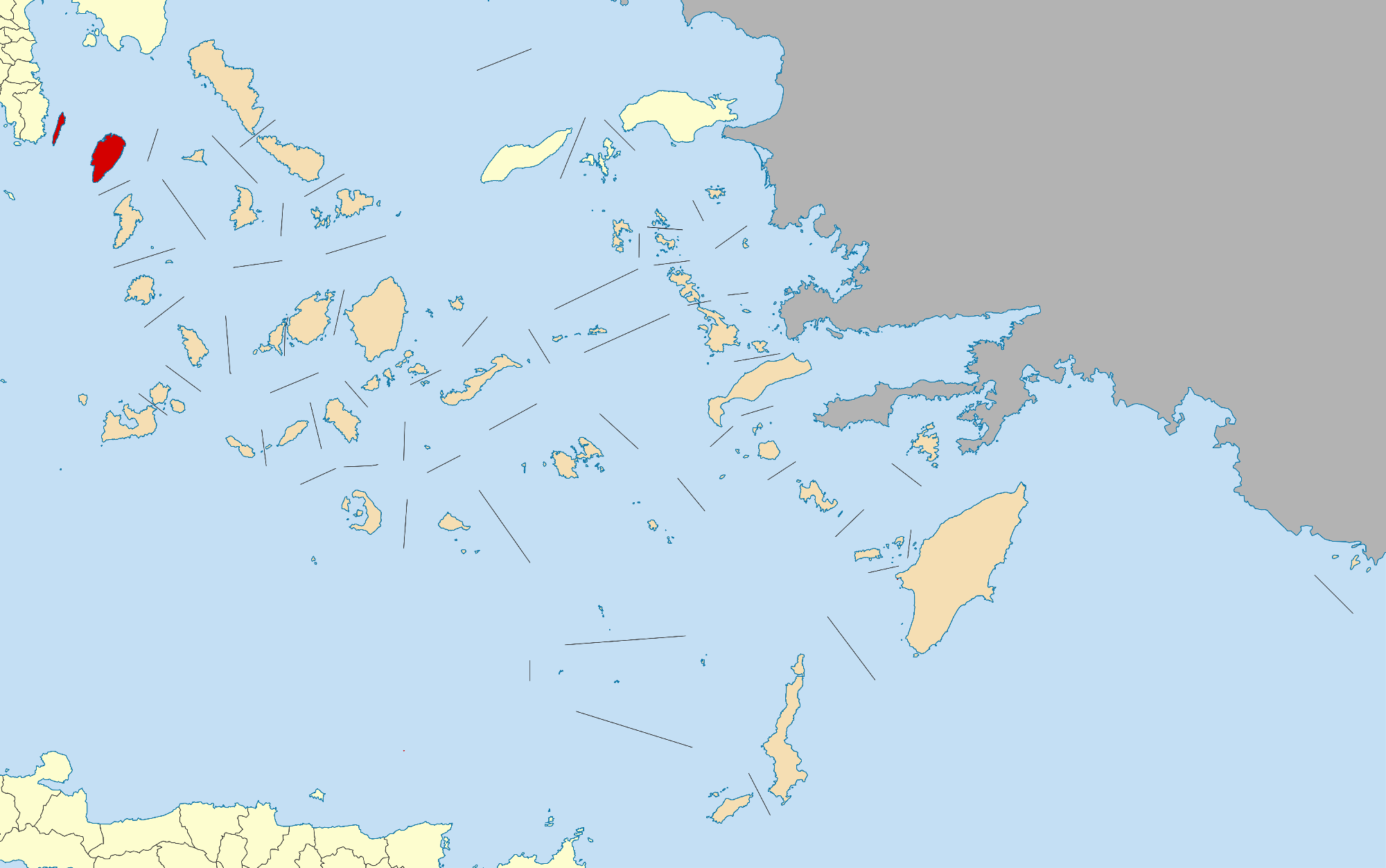

- Location within Greece
- Coordinates: 37°37′23″N 24°20′12″E
- Country: Greece
- Administrative region: South Aegean
- Regional unit: Kea-Kythnos
- Seat: Ioulis

Government
  - Mayor: Eirini Velissaropoulou (since 2019)

Area
  - Municipality: 148.9 km^{2} (57.5 sq mi)
- Highest elevation: 562 m (1,844 ft)
- Lowest elevation: 0 m (0 ft)

Population (2021)
  - Municipality: 3,346
  - Density: 22.47/km^{2} (58.20/sq mi)
- Time zone: UTC+2 (EET)
  - Summer (DST): UTC+3 (EEST)
- Postal code: 840 02
- Area code: 22880
- Vehicle registration: ΕΜ
- Website: kea.gr

Kea (Greek: Κέα), also known as Tzia (Greek: Τζιά) and in antiquity Keos (Greek: Κέως, Latin: Ceos), is a Greek island in the Cyclades archipelago in the Aegean Sea. Kea is part of the Kea-Kythnos regional unit.

== Geography ==
It is the island of the Cyclades complex that is closest to Attica (about 1 hour by ferry from Lavrio) and is also 20 km (12 mi) from Cape Sounio as well as 60 km (37 mi) SE of Athens. Its climate is arid, and its terrain is hilly. Kea is 19 km (12 mi) long from north to south and 9 km (6 mi) wide from west to east. The area is 128.9 km^{2} (49.8 sq mi) with the highest point being 560 m (1,837 ft) above sea level. The municipality, which includes the island Makronisos, has an area of 148.926 km^{2} (57.501 sq mi).

Its capital, Ioulis, is inland at a high altitude (like most ancient Cycladic settlements, for fear of pirates) and is considered quite picturesque. Other major villages of Kea are the port of Korissia and the fishing village of Vourkari. After suffering depopulation for many decades, Kea has been recently rediscovered by Athenians as a convenient destination for weekend and yachting trips. The population in 2019 was 2,568.

=== Local communities ===
- Agia Marina, Kea
- Chavouna
- Ellinika
- Kato Meria
- Ioulis
- Korissia
- Koundouros
- Otzias
- Pisses
- Vourkari
- Pera Meria

== History ==
=== Neolithic ===
Kephala, Kea was a Late/Final Neolithic settlement on Kea. It is located on a rocky promontory in the northern part of Kea. The Final Neolithic of the Cyclades is fully represented here. It is the only significant open settlement of this period. This means a settlement with free-standing structures that is not protected by a wall.

Some sites in Attica, such as Athens and Thorikos, and in Aegina, seem to be related to Kephala. The Final Neolithic Period in southern Greece is known as Attica-Kephala culture.

Kephala has been recently dated to about 4600-4500 BC, but the Attica-Kephala culture may have continued later, even in the 4th millennium BC, such as up to 3500 BC.

The Neolithic community of Kephala may have consisted of 45-80 people. They farmed cereals and kept sheep, goats, cattle, and pigs. But fishing was also important.

Pottery was covered with a red slip and decorated by burnishing. Their tools were also manufactured of obsidian that came from the island of Melos. They also made marble vases.

On the slope of the promontory, a little lower than the settlement, a cist grave cemetery was found. The walls of the graves were made of small flat stones, and each had several burials. Children were commonly buried in pottery jars (pithoi). The cemetery may have been in use for about 150 years.

Evidence for metalworking was found, one of the earliest occurrences in the Aegean. Fragments of clay crucibles and small copper artifacts were discovered. The copper that was used at Kephala may have come from the mines in Lavrion in eastern Attica.

=== Bronze Age ===
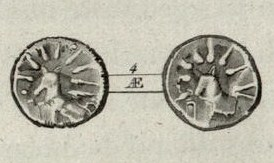
Coin from ancient Kea; with a dog and a star

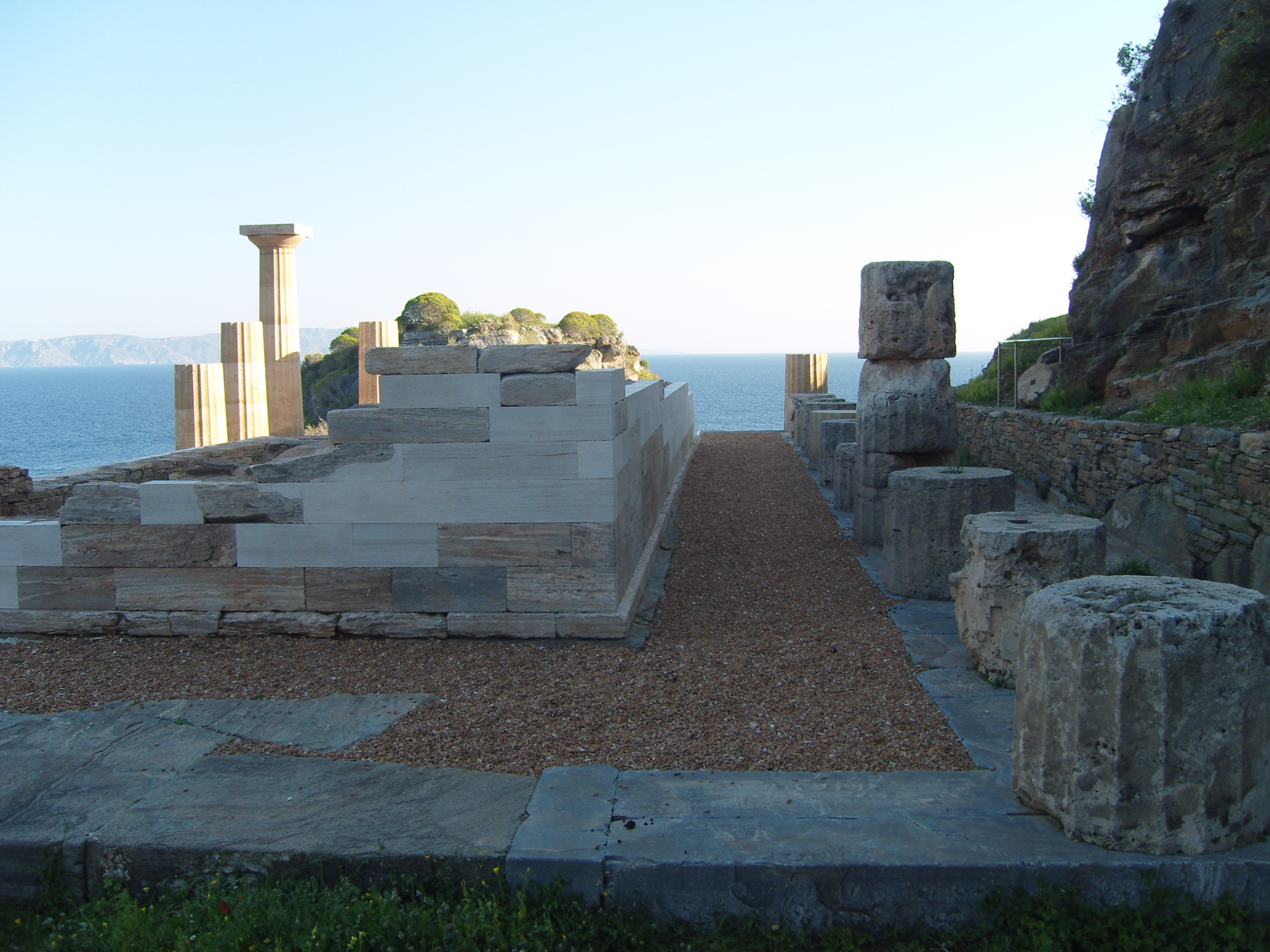
Temple of Athena (Karthaia) on the island

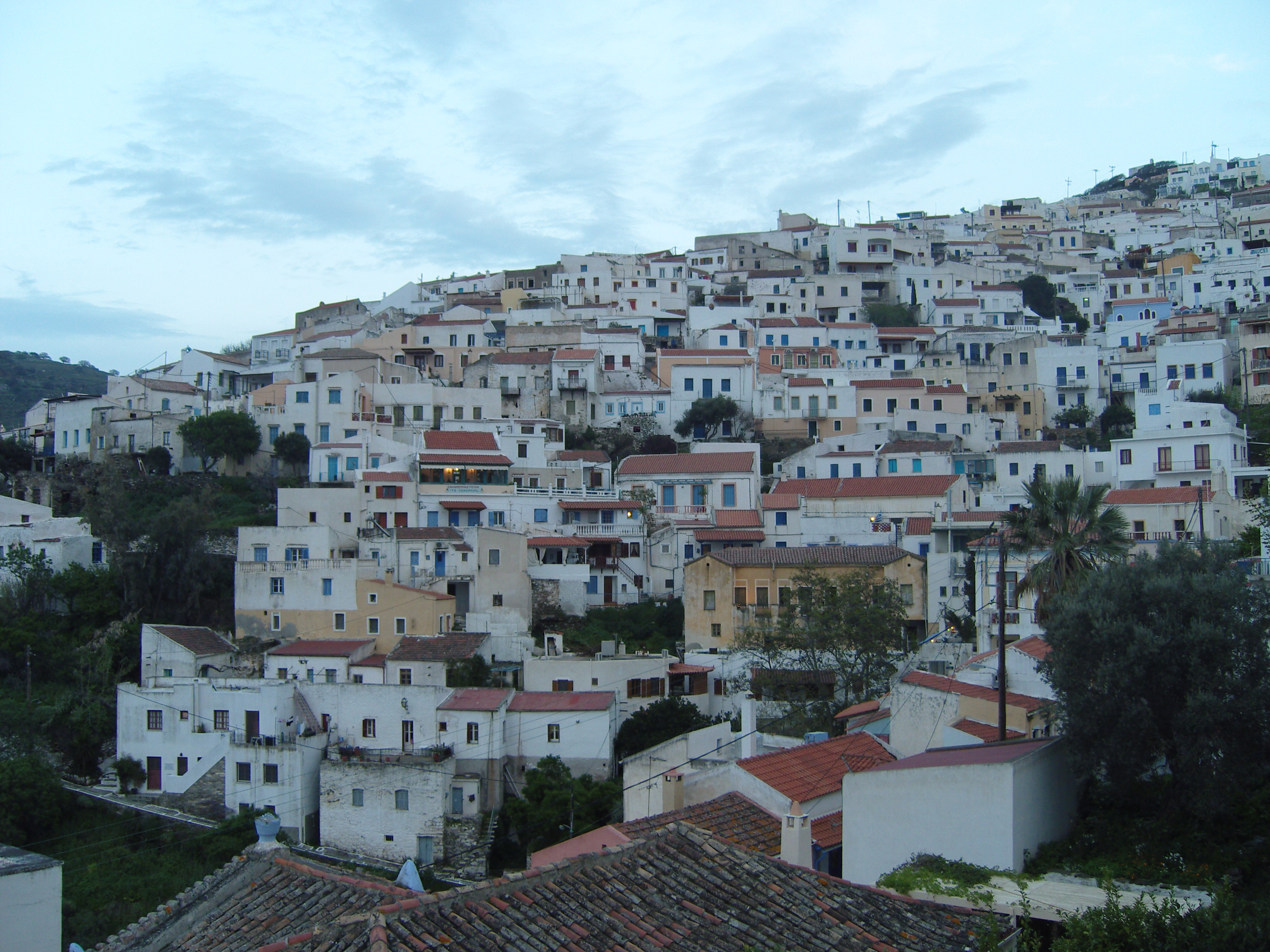
Ioulida

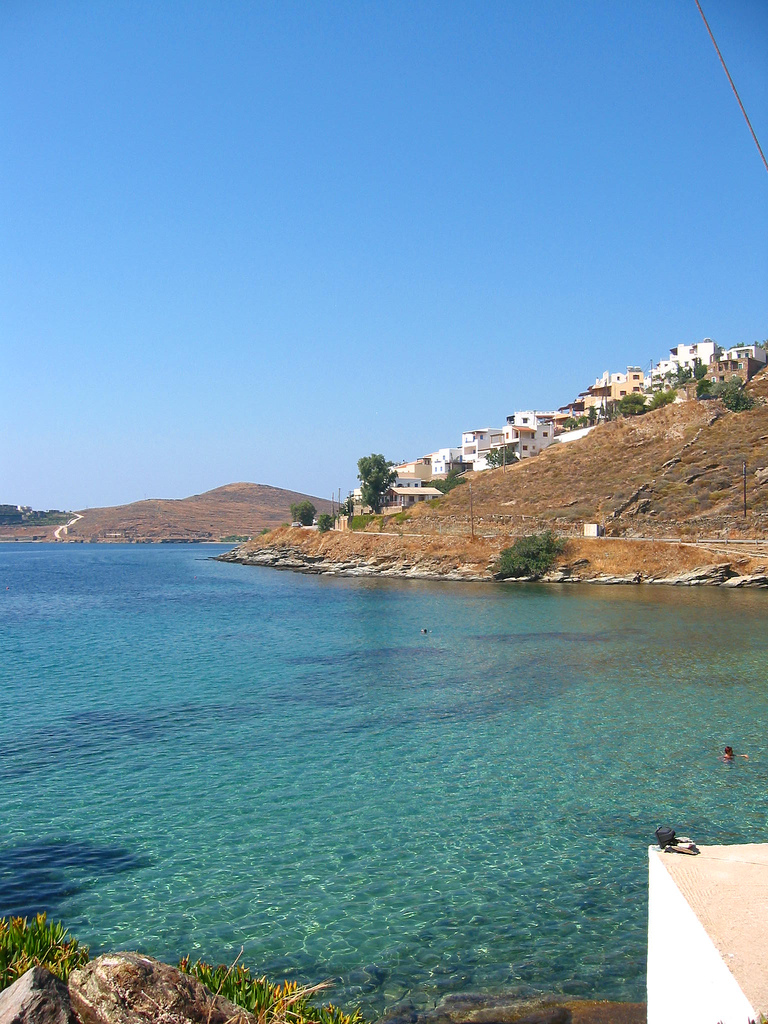
A beach in Kea

Kea is the location of a Bronze Age settlement at the site now called Ayia Irini, which reached its height in the Late Minoan and Early Mycenaean eras (1600–1400 BC).

In the Archaic period, the island was divided between four city-states (poleis): Ioulis, Karthaia, Poieessa and Koressos.

During the classical period, Kea (Ceos) was the home of Simonides and of his nephew Bacchylides, both ancient Greek lyric poets, of the Sophist Prodicus, and of the physician Erasistratus. The inhabitants were known for offering sacrifices to the Dog Star, Sirius, and to Zeus to bring cooling breezes while awaiting the reappearance of Sirius in summer; if the star rose clear, it would portend good fortune; if it was misty or faint, then it foretold (or emanated) pestilence. Coins retrieved from the island from the 3rd century BC feature dogs or stars with emanating rays, highlighting Sirius' importance.

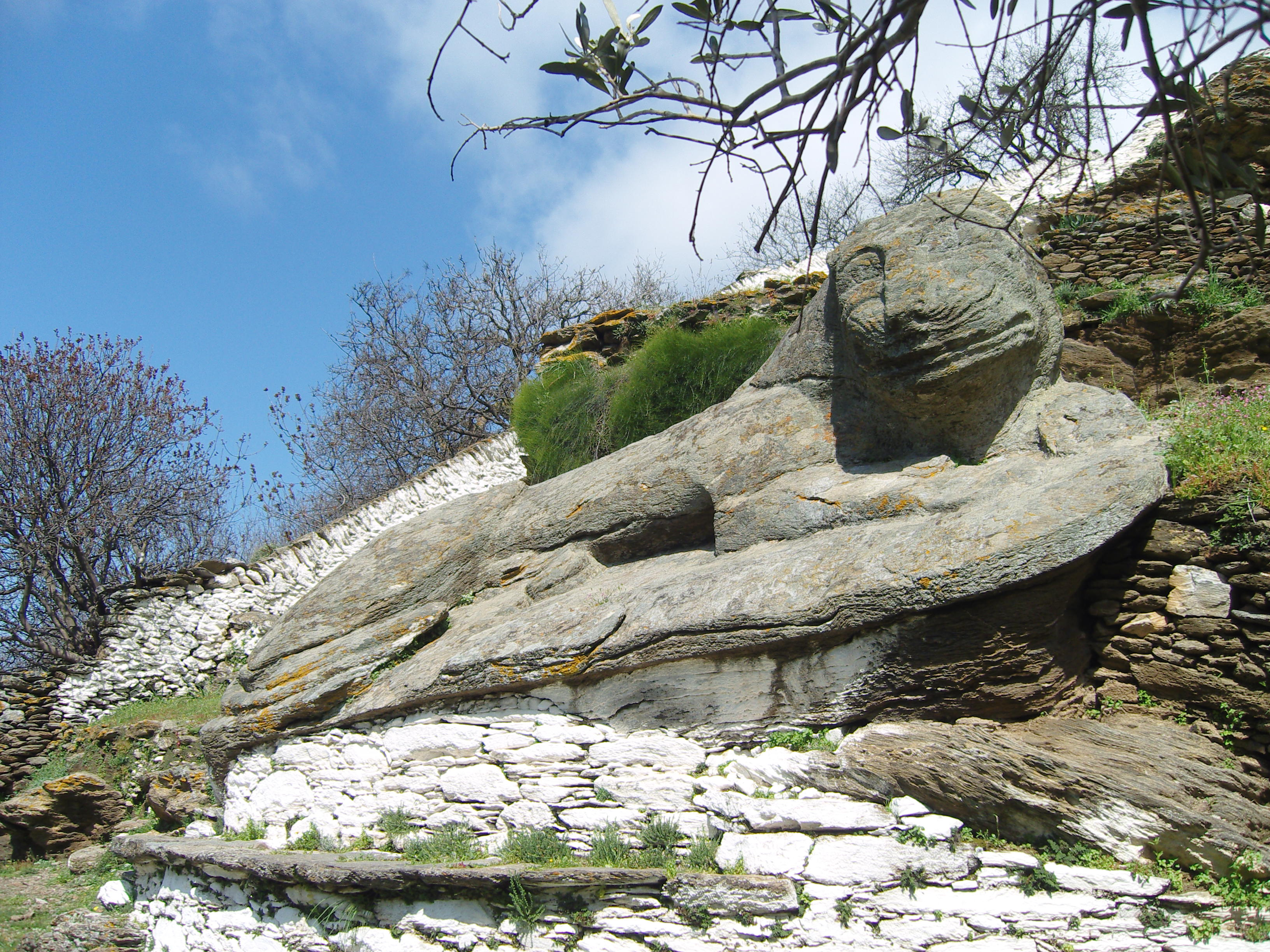
The stone-carved Lion of Kea (also known as the Lion of Ioulis or Liontas) dates to at least 600 BC.

The island is known for an ancient stone-carved lion, known as the Lion of Ioulis (or Liontas), which was carved some time before 600 BC. According to legend, the island of Kea was once home to a population of water nymphs whose beauty, along with their lovely island, made the gods jealous, who sent a lion to lay waste to the island. In any case, the mainland of Greece was home to a significant population of lions throughout the classical period.

Also in the classical period the island was famous for its mines of a red ochre known as 'Kean miltos'; Theophrastus refers to it in his On Stones. In early 1884, the British explorers Theodore and Mabel Bent visited the island in search of remnants of these mines.

During the Byzantine period, many churches were built, and the prosperity of the island rose. It was Byzantine until, in 1204, it was captured by the Venetians in the wake of the Fourth Crusade. The Archbishop of Athens, Michael Choniates, came here in exile after his city fell to the Crusaders in 1205. The Byzantines recaptured it under Licario in 1278. In around 1302, during the Byzantine–Venetian War, it again fell to the Venetians, who built a castle on the ancient acropolis of Ioulis.

Albanians also settled on the island, thereafter assimilating into the Greek population. Kea was taken from the Venetians by the Ottoman Turks in 1537. Along with the rest of the Cyclades, Kea joined Greece following the Greek War of Independence in 1821.

HMHS Britannic, the third ship of the White Star Line's Olympic-class ocean liners and sister ship of RMS Olympic and RMS Titanic, sank in the Kea Channel, between the islands of Kea and Makronisos, on 21 November 1916 after hitting a mine, with the loss of thirty lives. She was the largest ship lost during World War I. A number of the ship's survivors rowed to Kea island where they were later picked up by other ships in the area.

== Ecclesiastical History ==
=== Orthodox Eparchy ===
The earliest indication of it as a Greek bishopric is in a list by the Sicilian monk Neilos Doxapatres of the second half of the 12th century, and this may have been a later interpolation, since the list of the Greek bishops of Kea begins only at the end of the 16th century.

=== Latin Catholic residential diocese ===
In 1330, as part of the Venetian Duchy of Naxos, it became, under the name Ceo, the see of a Latin Church bishopric of Ceo in the Cyclades, which in 1600 was renamed bishopric of Diocese of Thermia (island Knythos), but suppressed in 1650, after the Ottoman conquest. It is today listed by the Catholic Church as a titular see.

== Historical population ==
The French traveler Jean de Thévenot reported 700 houses in the main town of Kea, now Ioulida, in 1656 (his compatriot the botanist Joseph Pitton de Tournefort guessed 2500 in 1700). The Greek historian Ioannis Psyllas estimated a population of more than 7000 on the island in 1821, a number that dropped sharply due to a plague outbreak that killed 1600 to 2000 Keans in 1823.

Official Greek census data shows a population of around 4000 in the 19th century, decreasing gradually until 1981, and then beginning to rebound under the influence of tourism.

Year	Island population
1835	3,202
1853	4,162
1856	4,297
1861	3,498
1870	3,789
1879	4,311
1889	3,863
1896	4,975
1907	3,817
1920	3,575
1940	3,764
1951	3,108
1961	2,361
1971	1,666
1981	1,648
1991	1,797
2001	2,417
2011	2,455
2021	2,335

== Climate ==
Kea has a warm-summer Mediterranean climate.

Climate data for Kea island (192m)
Month	Jan	Feb	Mar	Apr	May	Jun	Jul	Aug	Sep	Oct	Nov	Dec	Year
Mean daily maximum °C (°F)	11.7 (53.1)	13 (55)	15.3 (59.5)	17.1 (62.8)	23.1 (73.6)	27.6 (81.7)	28.6 (83.5)	28.8 (83.8)	26.2 (79.2)	23.2 (73.8)	18.7 (65.7)	15.3 (59.5)	20.7 (69.3)
Mean daily minimum °C (°F)	8.3 (46.9)	9.2 (48.6)	10.4 (50.7)	12.5 (54.5)	16.8 (62.2)	21.6 (70.9)	23.6 (74.5)	24.1 (75.4)	21.8 (71.2)	19 (66)	15.4 (59.7)	12.1 (53.8)	16.2 (61.2)
Average precipitation mm (inches)	107 (4.2)	58 (2.3)	62.4 (2.46)	56.7 (2.23)	3.6 (0.14)	4.2 (0.17)	0.6 (0.02)	0 (0)	17.8 (0.70)	38.3 (1.51)	44.3 (1.74)	142.3 (5.60)	535.2 (21.07)
Source: http://penteli.meteo.gr/stations/kea/ (2019 – 2020 averages)

== Scuba diving ==
The island is a destination for exploring nature and scuba diving, with excellent visibility, rich marine life, and wall, cavern, and wreck diving. The water temperature ranges from 20 to 26 °C.

The highlight for recreational divers is the wreck of the paddle-wheeler steamship Patris which sank in 1868 and lies at a depth of 28 metres (92 ft). She was a passenger steamer 66 m long, in service in the Aegean Sea, owned by the Hellenic Steamship Co., based on Syros island, at that time the capital of Greece. She hit the reef off Koundouros Bay at Makriopounda, Kea island on 24 February 1868 with about 120 passengers aboard. No casualties were reported owing to the proximity of land.

The wreck of HMHS Britannic, located 1.5 nautical miles offshore, is at a depth of about 122 m (400 ft). The French ship SS Burdigala is a recently discovered wreck, 800 m (2,625 ft) from the island's harbour, at 53 m depth. Sunk 14 November 1916, she was a 180 m-long (590 ft) ocean liner built in Germany by Ferdinand Schichau Werft.

== Notable people ==
- Simonides (c. 556 BC – 468 BC) lyric poet
- Bacchylides (5th century BC) lyric poet
- Prodicus (5th century BC) sophist
- Theramenes (late 5th century BC) Athenian statesman
- Aristo (3rd century BC) peripatetic philosopher
- Emmanouil Papadopoulos (died 1810), Russian general
- Patriarch Meletius III of Constantinople
- Cyparissos Stephanos (1857–1917), mathematician
- John Angelo Congear, father of Australian AFL footballer, Angelo Congear

== In literature ==
Kea is the scene of much of Mary Renault's novel, The Praise Singer.

== See also ==
- Communities of the Cyclades
