= Ioulis =

Capital of Kea, Greece

Ioulis Ιουλίς
- Community
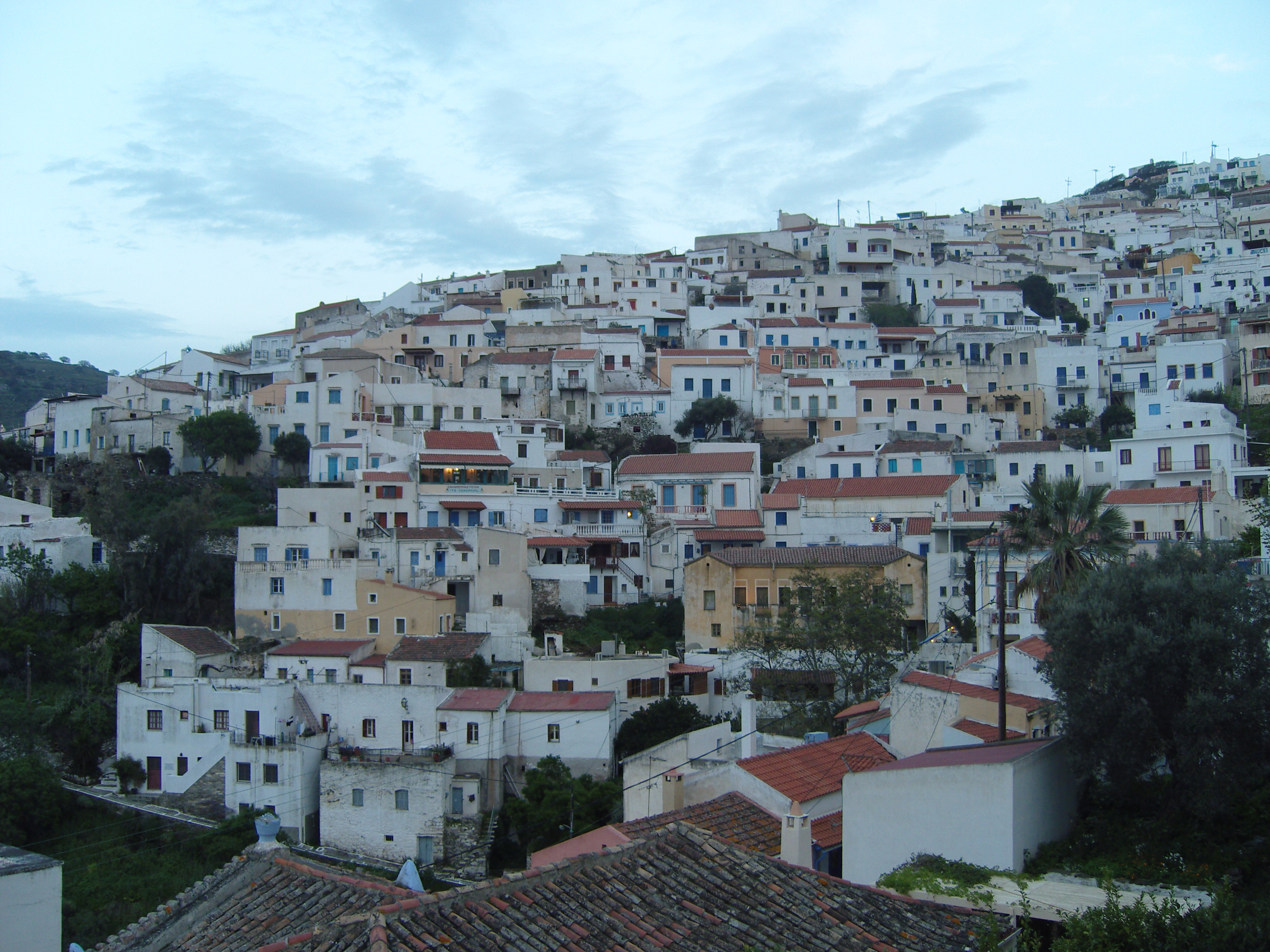

- Location within Greece
- Coordinates: 37°38′20″N 24°20′28″E
- Country: Greece
- Administrative region: South Aegean
- Regional unit: Kea-Kythnos
- Municipality: Kea

Population (2021)
  - Community: 1,225
- Time zone: UTC+2 (EET)
  - Summer (DST): UTC+3 (EEST)

Ioulis or Ioulida (Greek: Ιουλίς, Ιουλίδα; Ancient Greek: Ἰουλίς), locally called Chora or Hora (Greek: Χώρα) like the main towns of most Greek islands, and sometimes known by the island name of Kea or Keos (or earlier Zea), is the capital of the island of Kea in the Cyclades. It has a population of 1,225 inhabitants according to the 2021 Greek census.

== Modern town ==
The Ioulida of today, while popular with both tourists and middle-class Athenians, is relatively unspoiled in that cars must be left at the entrance of the town, and "life is pretty much the way it has always been." As in Korissia, "the architectural style is not like the typical Cycladic. The heart of Chora is the square with the grand city hall."

== Ancient town ==
The ancient city (also called Iulis) was celebrated as the birthplace of Simonides, Bacchylides, Prodicus, Erasistratus, and Aristo; it was said to have been built by "Eupylos the son of Chryso the demi-goddess." It led a revolt against Athens in 364/3 BC; an Athenian decree has been preserved imposing a fine and punishing rebels, of which "ll. 27-42 contain 'the most formidably complex sentence so far to be found in classical Athenian decrees' (KJ Dover, TPS 1981, 1-14 at 8-11)." A nineteenth-century description says:

Iulis was situated on a hill about 25 stadia from the sea, in the northern part of the island, on the same site as the modern Zea, which is now the only town in the island. There are several remains of Iulis: the most important is a colossal lion, about 20 feet in length, which lies a quarter of an hour east of the town.... The laws of Iulis were very celebrated in antiquity; and hence "Cean Laws" were used proverbially to indicate any excellent institutions... These laws related to the morals of the citizens and their mode of life. One of them quoted by Menander was particularly celebrated: ὀ μὴ δυνάμενος ζῆν καλῶς οὑ ζῇ κακῶς ["whoever cannot live well should (at least) not live badly"].

Under Roman rule it enjoyed political supremacy as well has been the main population center of the island. A process of nucleation reduced the number of population centers: "By the 2nd century BC the poleis of Koressos and Poieessa were absorbed by their neighbours Ioulis and Karthaia, and in the Late Roman period Karthaia ceased to exist, leaving Ioulis (Chora) as the single polis of the island." In the thirteenth century it seems to have been still the only town on the island.

Its ruins were visited by Joseph Pitton de Tournefort in 1700 and identified by P. O. Brønsted in 1826.
